= 1988 Canoe Slalom World Cup =

The 1988 Canoe Slalom World Cup was a series of seven races in four canoeing and kayaking categories organized by the International Canoe Federation (ICF). It was the inaugural edition. The first four races were held in North America, the next two races were also part of the Europa Cup and the final race was held in Augsburg, Germany, on 21 August 1988.

== Calendar ==
Label	Venue	Date	Note
World Cup Race 1	(United States) Wausau, Wisconsin	18-19 June	
World Cup Race 2	(United States) Savage River, Maryland	25-26 June	Pre-world championship event
World Cup Race 3	(Canada) Minden, Ontario	1-2 July	
World Cup Race 4	(United States) South Bend, Indiana	4 July	
World Cup Race 5	(Republic of Ireland) Dublin	6-7 August	Europa Cup
World Cup Race 6	(United Kingdom) Nottingham	13-14 August	Europa Cup
World Cup Final	(West Germany) Augsburg	21 August	

== Final standings ==
The best 5 results of each paddler/boat counted for the overall standings with double points for the World Cup final.

=== C1 men ===
Pos	Athlete	Points
1	Jon Lugbill (USA)	135
2	David Hearn (USA)	130
3	Jed Prentice (USA)	115
4	Thierry Humeau (FRA)	76
5	Jože Vidmar (YUG)	73
6	Jacky Avril (FRA)	52
7	Juraj Ontko (TCH)	41
8	Carlo Faloci (FRA)	39
9	Renato de Monti (ITA)	33
10	Martin Lang (FRG)	32
11	Andreas Kübler (FRG)	31
12	Janko Brezigar (YUG)	30
13	Jiří Rohan (TCH)	30
14	Imrich Vida (TCH)	20
15	Mark Delaney (GBR)	20
16	Adam Pietrasik (POL)	19
17	Gareth Marriott (GBR)	13
17	Martyn Hedges (GBR)	13
19	Grzegorz Sarata (POL)	12
20	Robert McGuiness (AUS)	12
21	Piotr Sarata (POL)	11
22	Bruce Lessels (USA)	11
23	Mike Corcoran (IRL)	10
24	Peter Eckhardt (AUS)	8
25	Boštjan Žitnik (YUG)	4
26	Jozef Hajdučík (TCH)	2
27	Larry Norman (CAN)	1

=== C2 men ===
Pos	Athletes	Points
1	Lecky Haller/Jamie McEwan (USA)	106
2	Frank Hemmer/Thomas Loose (FRG)	101
3	Michel Saidi/Jérôme Daval (FRA)	100
4	Jan Petříček/Tomáš Petříček (TCH)	81
5	Jérôme Daille/Gilles Lelievre (FRA)	79
6	Miroslav Šimek/Jiří Rohan (TCH)	65
7	Miroslav Hajdučík/Milan Kučera (TCH)	62
8	Ueli Matti/Peter Matti (SUI)	60
9	Joe Jacobi/Scott Strausbaugh (USA)	58
10	Thierry Saidi/Emmanuel del Rey (FRA)	57
11	Nicolas Le Friec/Jean-Pierre Le Lann (FRA)	47
12	Stephan Bittner/Volker Nerlich (FRG)	37
13	Frank Becker/Martin Fröhlke (FRG)	26
14	Colin Brown/Alan Meikle (GBR)	23
15	Bill Hearn/John Anderson (USA)	16
16	Mike Larimer/Steve Thomas (USA)	15
17	Clive Richardson/Colin Thompson (GBR)	13
18	John Harris/Charles Harris (USA)	11
19	Grzegorz Staniszewski/Wojciech Staniszewski (POL)	10
20	Stefan Müller/Ernst Rudin (SUI)	9
21	Don Sorensen/Ray McLain (USA)	8
22	Rudy Koehler/Mark Brown (CAN)	6

=== K1 men ===
Pos	Athlete	Points
1	Richard Fox (GBR)	110
2	Janez Skok (YUG)	109
3	Laurent Brissaud (FRA)	86
4	Melvyn Jones (GBR)	86
5	Richard Weiss (USA)	60
6	Jernej Abramič (YUG)	51
7	Luboš Hilgert (TCH)	51
8	Peter Micheler (FRG)	50
9	Chris Doughty (USA)	50
10	Martin Hemmer (FRG)	48
11	Manuel Brissaud (FRA)	37
12	Ivan Hilgert (TCH)	32
13	Marjan Štrukelj (YUG)	32
14	Pierpaolo Ferrazzi (ITA)	26
15	Christophe Prigent (FRA)	25
16	Michael Glöckle (FRG)	24
17	Russell Smith (GBR)	24
18	Donald Johnstone (NZL)	18
19	Ralph Rhein (SUI)	14
20	Jean Pierre Latimier (FRA)	14
21	Pavel Přindiš (TCH)	13
22	Ettore Ivaldi (ITA)	11
23	Kazimierz Gawlikowski (POL)	10
24	Eugenio Salvi (ITA)	10
25	Albin Čižman (YUG)	9
26	Marty McCormick (USA)	8
27	Horst Pock (AUT)	7
28	Ian Wiley (IRL)	6
29	Roland Eisele (FRG)	6
30	Frits Sins (NED)	5
31	Ian Raspin (GBR)	3
32	Lars Johansson (SWE)	1
33	Michael Reys (NED)	1

=== K1 women ===
Pos	Athlete	Points
1	Dana Chladek (USA)	112
2	Myriam Jerusalmi (FRA)	110
3	Marie-Françoise Grange-Prigent (FRA)	98
4	Anne Boixel (FRA)	66
5	Zdenka Grossmannová (TCH)	66
6	Elizabeth Sharman (GBR)	58
7	Cathy Hearn-Haller (USA)	57
8	Margit Messelhäuser (FRG)	49
9	Štěpánka Hilgertová (TCH)	46
10	Elisabeth Micheler (FRG)	42
11	Jennifer Stone (USA)	42
12	Gabi Loose (FRG)	36
13	Karen Davies (GBR)	33
14	Joanne Woods (CAN)	32
15	Sylvie Arnaud (FRA)	20
16	Danielle Woodward (AUS)	17
17	Sheryl Boyle (CAN)	15
18	Deborah Vogel (SUI)	12
19	Rachel Fox (GBR)	11
19	Kathy Lynch (NZL)	11
21	Michaela Buddeusová (TCH)	9
22	Claire Casson (NZL)	9
23	Marie-Claire Dönni (SUI)	6
24	Katrina Day (NZL)	5
25	Marta Grzybek (POL)	4
26	Meta Kastelič (YUG)	3
26	Mandy Linden (AUS)	3
26	Sanne van der Ros (NED)	3
29	Lena Cedrenius (SWE)	2
29	Giovanna Ambrosi (ITA)	2
29	Maylon T. Hanold (USA)	2
29	Eileen Ash (USA)	2
33	Brigitte Huber (AUT)	1

== Points ==
World Cup points were awarded based on the results of each race at each event as follows:

Position	1	2	3	4	5	6	7	8	9	10	11	12	13	14	15
All classes	25	20	15	12	11	10	9	8	7	6	5	4	3	2	1

== Results ==
Incomplete results listed below.

=== World Cup Race 1 ===
18-19 June in Wausau, Wisconsin

Event	Gold	Score	Silver	Score	Bronze	Score
C1 men	Jon Lugbill (USA)	189.60	Jed Prentice (USA)	190.21	David Hearn (USA)	191.56
C2 men	Jan Petříček/Tomáš Petříček (TCH)					
K1 men	Richard Fox (GBR)	178.07	Laurent Brissaud (FRA)	179.00	Richard Weiss (USA)	188.67
K1 women	Zdenka Grossmannová (TCH)	204.01	Dana Chladek (USA)	204.06	Myriam Jerusalmi (FRA)	206.35

=== World Cup Race 2 ===
25-26 June in Savage River, Maryland. The race was a tune up for the 1989 ICF Canoe Slalom World Championships.

Event	Gold	Score	Silver	Score	Bronze	Score
C1 men	Jon Lugbill (USA)	199.66	David Hearn (USA)	201.19	Jed Prentice (USA)	204.49
C2 men	Jérôme Daille/Gilles Lelievre (FRA)	221.41	Lecky Haller/Jamie McEwan (USA)	224.59	Michel Saidi/Jérôme Daval (FRA)	224.92
K1 men	Richard Fox (GBR)	180.21	Melvyn Jones (GBR)	183.45	Laurent Brissaud (FRA)	185.44
K1 women	Elizabeth Sharman (GBR)	215.42	Sylvie Arnaud (FRA)	219.70	Karen Davies (GBR)	226.90
K1 men team	Great Britain; Richard Fox; Melvyn Jones; Russell Smith	213.94	Yugoslavia; Jernej Abramič; Janez Skok; Albin Čižman	214.98	United States; Chris Doughty; Richard Weiss; Marty McCormick	215.42
K1 women team	France	263.32	Great Britain; Elizabeth Sharman; Karen Davies; Rachel Fox	287.38	United States	316.16

=== World Cup Race 3 ===
1-2 July in Minden, Ontario, Gull River

Event	Gold	Score	Silver	Score	Bronze	Score
C1 men	Jed Prentice (USA)					
C2 men	Lecky Haller/Jamie McEwan (USA)					
K1 men	Richard Fox (GBR)		Melvyn Jones (GBR)			
K1 women	Marie-Françoise Grange-Prigent (FRA)					

=== World Cup Race 4 ===
4 July in South Bend, Indiana

Event	Gold	Score	Silver	Score	Bronze	Score
C1 men	David Hearn (USA)					
C2 men	Lecky Haller/Jamie McEwan (USA)					
K1 men	Janez Skok (YUG)	195.65	Luboš Hilgert (TCH)	198.78	Ivan Hilgert (TCH)	199.71
K1 women	Marie-Françoise Grange-Prigent (FRA)					

=== World Cup Race 5 ===
6-7 August in Dublin

Event	Gold	Score	Silver	Score	Bronze	Score
C1 men	Jed Prentice (USA)		Jon Lugbill (USA)			
C2 men	Frank Hemmer/Thomas Loose (FRG)		Michel Saidi/Jérôme Daval (FRA)		Thierry Saidi/Emmanuel del Rey (FRA)	
K1 men	Janez Skok (YUG)		Pierpaolo Ferrazzi (ITA)		Richard Fox (GBR)	
K1 women	Elizabeth Sharman (GBR)		Marie-Françoise Grange-Prigent (FRA)		Myriam Jerusalmi (FRA)	

=== World Cup Race 6 ===
13-14 August in Nottingham

Event	Gold	Score	Silver	Score	Bronze	Score
C1 men	Jon Lugbill (USA)		David Hearn (USA)		Jed Prentice (USA)	
C2 men	Miroslav Šimek/Jiří Rohan (TCH)		Frank Hemmer/Thomas Loose (FRG)		Colin Brown/Alan Meikle (GBR)	
K1 men	Melvyn Jones (GBR)		Richard Fox (GBR)		Laurent Brissaud (FRA)	
K1 women	Štěpánka Hilgertová (TCH)		Myriam Jerusalmi (FRA)		Dana Chladek (USA)	

=== World Cup Final ===
21 August in Augsburg

Event	Gold	Score	Silver	Score	Bronze	Score
C1 men	David Hearn (USA)		Jon Lugbill (USA)		Jed Prentice (USA)	
C2 men	Frank Hemmer/Thomas Loose (FRG)		Miroslav Šimek/Jiří Rohan (TCH)		Michel Saidi/Jérôme Daval (FRA)	
K1 men	Peter Micheler (FRG)		Janez Skok (YUG)			
K1 women	Dana Chladek (USA)		Myriam Jerusalmi (FRA)			
