= 1989 Canoe Slalom World Cup =

The 1989 Canoe Slalom World Cup was a series of seven races in 4 canoeing and kayaking categories organized by the International Canoe Federation (ICF). It was the 2nd edition. The first 3 races were held in North America (2 in the USA and 1 in Canada) with the remaining 4 races in Europe.

== Calendar ==
Label	Venue	Date
World Cup Race 1	(Canada) Minden, Ontario	1 July
World Cup Race 2	(United States) South Bend, Indiana	4 July
World Cup Race 3	(United States) Wausau, Wisconsin	8-9 July
World Cup Race 4	(France) Bourg-Saint-Maurice	5-6 August
World Cup Race 5	(Italy) Mezzana	12 August
World Cup Race 6	(West Germany) Augsburg	15 August
World Cup Final	(Socialist Federal Republic of Yugoslavia) Tacen	19-20 August

== Final standings ==
Best 4 results plus the result from the World Cup final of each paddler/boat counted for the overall standings.

=== C1 men ===
Pos	Athlete	Points
1	Jon Lugbill (USA)	111
2	David Hearn (USA)	110
3	Jed Prentice (USA)	76
4	Thierry Humeau (FRA)	72
5	Bob Robison (USA)	54
6	Jože Vidmar (YUG)	48
7	Boštjan Žitnik (YUG)	43
8	Juraj Ontko (TCH)	43
9	Carlo Faloci (FRA)	41
10	Emmanuel Brugvin (FRA)	39

=== C2 men ===
Pos	Athletes	Points
1	Jérôme Daille/Gilles Lelievre (FRA)	105
2	Lecky Haller/Jamie McEwan (USA)	100
3	Joe Jacobi/Scott Strausbaugh (USA)	76
4	Michel Saidi/Jérôme Daval (FRA)	74
5	Thierry Saidi/Emmanuel del Rey (FRA)	62
6	Miroslav Šimek/Jiří Rohan (TCH)	61
7	Miroslav Hajdučík/Milan Kučera (TCH)	55
8	Frank Adisson/Wilfrid Forgues (FRA)	44
9	Sergei Kuznetsov/Alexander Bondar (URS)	36
10	Mark Ciborowski/Dave Paton (USA)	33

=== K1 men ===
Pos	Athlete	Points
1	Richard Fox (GBR)	107
2	Luboš Hilgert (TCH)	78
3	Albin Čižman (YUG)	67
4	Marjan Štrukelj (YUG)	62
5	Ian Wiley (IRL)	61
6	Laurent Brissaud (FRA)	61
7	Janez Skok (YUG)	58
8	Jernej Abramič (YUG)	58
9	Melvyn Jones (GBR)	37
10	Michael Seibert (FRG)	36

=== K1 women ===
Pos	Athlete	Points
1	Myriam Jerusalmi (FRA)	105
2	Štěpánka Hilgertová (TCH)	76
3	Cathy Hearn (USA)	74
4	Zdenka Grossmannová (TCH)	69
5	Marie-Françoise Grange-Prigent (FRA)	67
6	Dana Chladek (USA)	65
7	Sylvie Arnaud-Lepeltier (FRA)	61
8	Anouk Loubie (FRA)	51
9	Elisabeth Micheler (FRG)	47
10	Anne Boixel (FRA)	47

== Points ==
World Cup points were awarded based on the results of each race at each event as follows:

Position	1	2	3	4	5	6	7	8	9	10	11	12	13	14	15
All classes	25	20	15	12	11	10	9	8	7	6	5	4	3	2	1

== Results ==
Missing results from the first 4 races.

Based on the overall scores and the scoring system, the following paddlers earned medals in the first 4 races:

C1 men

- Jon Lugbill (USA) - 2 golds
- David Hearn (USA) - 1 gold, 2 silvers

C2 men

- Jérôme Daille/Gilles Lelievre (FRA) - 2 golds, 1 silver
- Lecky Haller/Jamie McEwan (USA) - 1 gold, 1 silver and 1 bronze or 3 silvers

K1 men

- Richard Fox (GBR) - 2 golds, 1 silver

K1 women

- Myriam Jerusalmi (FRA) - 2 golds, 1 silver

=== World Cup Race 5 ===
The World Cup Race in Mezzana, Italy took place on August 12.

Event	Gold	Score	Silver	Score	Bronze	Score
C1 men	Jon Lugbill (USA)	166.49	David Hearn (USA)	168.36	Thierry Humeau (FRA)	173.28
C2 men	France; Thierry Saidi; Emmanuel del Rey	190.34	France; Jérôme Daille; Gilles Lelievre	193.16	France; Michel Saidi; Jérôme Daval	195.08
K1 men	Albin Čižman (YUG)	163.48	Luboš Hilgert (TCH)	164.14	Pierpaolo Ferrazzi (ITA)	164.19
K1 women	Anouk Loubie (FRA)	184.54	Dana Chladek (USA)	187.45	Štěpánka Hilgertová (TCH)	188.18

=== World Cup Race 6 ===
The World Cup Race in Augsburg, West Germany took place on August 15.

Event	Gold	Score	Silver	Score	Bronze	Score
C1 men	Jon Lugbill (USA)	206.35	Thierry Humeau (FRA)	218.46	Jože Vidmar (YUG)	221.31
C2 men	Czechoslovakia; Jiří Rohan; Miroslav Šimek	233.47	United States; Jamie McEwan; Lecky Haller	236.03	West Germany; Thomas Loose; Frank Hemmer	241.45
K1 men	Michael Seibert (FRG)	197.87	Luboš Hilgert (TCH)	199.76	Laurent Brissaud (FRA)	204.59
K1 women	Zdenka Grossmannová (TCH)	239.61	Myriam Jerusalmi (FRA)	240.49	Eva Roth (FRG)	242.28

=== World Cup Final ===
The World Cup Final took place in Tacen, Yugoslavia on August 19-20.

Event	Gold	Score	Silver	Score	Bronze	Score
C1 men	David Hearn (USA)	126.64	Boštjan Žitnik (YUG)	127.78	Gareth Marriott (GBR)	128.43
C2 men	Czechoslovakia; Miroslav Šimek; Jiří Rohan	132.96	United States; Lecky Haller; Jamie McEwan	133.32	France; Jérôme Daille; Gilles Lelievre	133.64
K1 men	Richard Fox (GBR)	115.94	Ian Wiley (IRL)	116.11	Luboš Hilgert (TCH)	116.81
K1 women	Sylvie Arnaud-Lepeltier (FRA)	135.31	Zdenka Grossmannová (TCH)	137.71	Myriam Jerusalmi (FRA)	142.25
