= 1991 Canoe Slalom World Cup =

The 1991 Canoe Slalom World Cup was a series of five races in 4 canoeing and kayaking categories organized by the International Canoe Federation (ICF). It was the 4th edition. The series consisted of 4 regular world cup races and the world cup final.

== Calendar ==
Label	Venue	Date
World Cup Race 1	(Italy) Mezzana	29–30 June
World Cup Race 2	(Germany) Augsburg	6–7 July
World Cup Race 3	(France) Réals	10–11 July
World Cup Race 4	(Canada) Minden	24–25 August
World Cup Final	(United States) Wausau	31 August - 1 September

== Final standings ==
The winner of each world cup race was awarded 25 points. The points scale reached down to 1 point for 15th place. Only the best three results of each athlete counted for the final world cup standings. If two or more athletes or boats were equal on points, the ranking was determined by their positions in the world cup final.

=== C1 men ===
Pos	Athlete	Points
1	Gareth Marriott (GBR)	70
2	Jon Lugbill (USA)	65
3	Martin Lang (GER)	56
4	David Hearn (USA)	49
5	Jed Prentice (USA)	40
6	Lukáš Pollert (TCH)	38
7	Hervé Delamarre (FRA)	38
8	Andreas Kübler (GER)	31
9	Mike Corcoran (IRL)	24
10	Jérôme Guiraud (FRA)	22

=== C2 men ===
Pos	Athletes	Points
1	Miroslav Šimek/Jiří Rohan (TCH)	75
2	Jérôme Daille/Gilles Lelievre (FRA)	60
3	Petr Štercl/Pavel Štercl (TCH)	57
4	Lecky Haller/Jamie McEwan (USA)	43
5	Ueli Matti/Peter Matti (SUI)	42
6	Joe Jacobi/Scott Strausbaugh (USA)	38
7	Viktor Beneš/Milan Kučera (TCH)	27
7	Stephan Bittner/Volker Nerlich (GER)	27
9	Elliot Weintrob/Martin McCormick (USA)	26
10	Manfred Berro/Michael Trummer (GER)	26

=== K1 men ===
Pos	Athlete	Points
1	Richard Fox (GBR)	70
2	Ian Wiley (IRL)	65
3	Richard Weiss (USA)	57
4	Melvyn Jones (GBR)	41
5	Luboš Hilgert (TCH)	33
6	David Ford (CAN)	32
7	Scott Shipley (USA)	30
8	Michael Seibert (GER)	29
9	Shaun Pearce (GBR)	27
10	Ian Raspin (GBR)	25

=== K1 women ===
Pos	Athlete	Points
1	Myriam Jerusalmi (FRA)	75
2	Sylvie Lepeltier (FRA)	60
3	Štěpánka Hilgertová (TCH)	55
4	Elisabeth Micheler (GER)	49
5	Dana Chladek (USA)	40
6	Eva Roth (GER)	35
7	Lynn Simpson (GBR)	32
8	Cathy Hearn (USA)	27
9	Kordula Striepecke (GER)	27
10	Joanne Woods (CAN)	25

== Results ==
=== World Cup Race 1 ===
The first world cup race of the season took place in Mezzana from 29 to 30 June.

Event	Gold	Score	Silver	Score	Bronze	Score
C1 men	Gareth Marriott (GBR)	137.25	Jon Lugbill (USA)	138.37	Lukáš Pollert (TCH)	139.20
C2 men	Czechoslovakia; Miroslav Šimek; Jiří Rohan	147.44	France; Jérôme Daille; Gilles Lelievre	152.67	United States; Joe Jacobi; Scott Strausbaugh	154.46
K1 men	Richard Fox (GBR)	132.61	Ian Wiley (IRL)	132.76	Gilles Clouzeau (FRA)	132.98
K1 women	Myriam Jerusalmi (FRA)	147.11	Dana Chladek (USA)	150.20	Kordula Striepecke (GER)	154.29

=== World Cup Race 2 ===
The second world cup race of the season took place at the Augsburg Eiskanal from 6 to 7 July.

Event	Gold	Score	Silver	Score	Bronze	Score
C1 men	David Hearn (USA)	163.51	Martin Lang (GER)	166.68	Hervé Delamarre (FRA)	167.57
C2 men	Czechoslovakia; Miroslav Šimek; Jiří Rohan	183.06	France; Jérôme Daille; Gilles Lelievre	184.18	Czechoslovakia; Viktor Beneš; Milan Kučera	184.20
K1 men	Richard Fox (GBR)	155.68	Melvyn Jones (GBR)	155.74	David Ford (CAN)	158.08
K1 women	Elisabeth Micheler (GER)	177.10	Myriam Jerusalmi (FRA)	182.02	Eva Roth (GER)	184.26

=== World Cup Race 3 ===
The third world cup race of the season took place in Reals from 10 to 11 July.

Event	Gold	Score	Silver	Score	Bronze	Score
C1 men	Martin Lang (GER)	178.29	Jon Lugbill (USA)	179.14	Andreas Kübler (GER)	179.30
C2 men	Czechoslovakia; Petr Štercl; Pavel Štercl	189.20	France; Jérôme Daille; Gilles Lelievre	190.61	France; Frank Adisson; Wilfrid Forgues	191.54
K1 men	Ian Raspin (GBR)	161.66	Richard Fox (GBR)	162.94	Shaun Pearce (GBR)	163.47
K1 women	Myriam Jerusalmi (FRA)	180.26	Sylvie Lepeltier (FRA)	190.29	Štěpánka Hilgertová (TCH)	190.93

=== World Cup Race 4 ===
The fourth world cup race of the season took place at the Minden Wild Water Preserve in Ontario from 24 to 25 August.

Event	Gold	Score	Silver	Score	Bronze	Score
C1 men	Gareth Marriott (GBR)	179.71	Jon Lugbill (USA)	180.54	Jed Prentice (USA)	183.07
C2 men	Czechoslovakia; Miroslav Šimek; Jiří Rohan	193.01	United States; Lecky Haller; Jamie McEwan	193.66	Switzerland; Ueli Matti; Peter Matti	199.98
K1 men	Richard Weiss (USA)	167.25	Ian Wiley (IRL)	168.90	Richard Fox (GBR)	169.12
K1 women	Sylvie Lepeltier (FRA)	191.80	Štěpánka Hilgertová (TCH)	197.57	Cathy Hearn (USA)	207.34

=== World Cup Final ===
The final world cup race of the season took place in Wausau, Wisconsin from 31 August to 1 September.

Event	Gold	Score	Silver	Score	Bronze	Score
C1 men	Jon Lugbill (USA)	193.78	Gareth Marriott (GBR)	201.52	Jed Prentice (USA)	202.35
C2 men	Czechoslovakia; Miroslav Šimek; Jiří Rohan	204.25	Czechoslovakia; Petr Štercl; Pavel Štercl	205.57	Switzerland; Ueli Matti; Peter Matti	213.84
K1 men	Ian Wiley (IRL)	181.98	Richard Weiss (USA)	182.97	Melvyn Jones (GBR)	183.01
K1 women	Myriam Jerusalmi (FRA)	211.65	Štěpánka Hilgertová (TCH)	212.81	Sylvie Lepeltier (FRA)	214.47
