= Richard Fox (canoeist) =

British slalom canoeist

Medal record

Men's canoe slalom

Representing Great Britain

World Championships
Gold medal – first place	1979 Jonquière	K1 team
Gold medal – first place	1981 Bala	K1
Gold medal – first place	1981 Bala	K1 team
Gold medal – first place	1983 Meran	K1
Gold medal – first place	1983 Meran	K1 team
Gold medal – first place	1985 Augsburg	K1
Gold medal – first place	1987 Bourg St.-Maurice	K1 team
Gold medal – first place	1989 Savage River	K1
Gold medal – first place	1993 Mezzana	K1
Gold medal – first place	1993 Mezzana	K1 team
Bronze medal – third place	1979 Jonquière	K1

Richard Munro Fox MBE (born 5 June 1960 in Winsford, Somerset) is a British slalom canoeist who competed for Great Britain from the late 1970s to the mid-1990s. He won eleven medals at the ICF Canoe Slalom World Championships with ten golds (K1: 1981, 1983, 1985, 1989, 1993; K1 team: 1979, 1981, 1983, 1987, 1993) and a bronze (K1: 1979). Fox also won the overall World Cup title three times (1988, 1989, 1991) and the Euro Cup (discontinued competition) four times.

Fox also finished fourth in the K1 event at the 1992 Summer Olympics in Barcelona.

== Early life and canoeing beginnings ==
Fox was born in Somerset, England, but moved to Harpenden, Hertfordshire, in his younger years. His father, Roger Fox, an official with the British Canoe Union, was one of the founder members in 1970, with Ron Vessey and Richard Scaife, of the St Albans and District Canoe Club. Fox attended St Albans Boys' Grammar School (later to become Verulam School) from 1971 and started attending his father's canoe rolling sessions at the Cottonmill Swimming Baths from the age of 11. His initial interest was purely recreational and Fox would go on canoeing trips with other club paddlers in boats he and his father had built together. In 1975 Fox began slalom training with the club at Dobbs Weir in Hoddesden and at Sharnbrook in Bedfordshire. Fox was reluctant but eventually by 1976 got involved in racing and made the British Junior Canoe Slalom team as a reserve.

== Racing career ==
Despite finishing outside the top 20 in his first races, Fox impressed with his obvious speed. His problem in the early years was the number of penalty points he accrued for hitting gates. In early 1977, Pete Keane (a member of the senior British C1 team) got Fox a place at the Spring senior training camp in Matlock, Derbyshire, where Fox impressed the technical coach Ken Langford and began, what was to become, a long and successful relationship. At the first race of the season on the River Tay at Grandtully in Scotland Fox went faster than the current British No.1 and future world champion, Albert Kerr, but again suffered from too many penalty points. Nevertheless, throughout the course of the year Fox qualified for the 4-man team to go the World Championships in Spittal (where Kerr won the first of his World Championships).

Fox's kayaking performance was plagued by crashing into too many gates, causing him to miss out on selection for the British team in 1978. Fox and Langford began a programme of mental analysis and rehearsal of gate technique. Fox achieved a bronze medal in the K1 Individual class at the World Championships in Jonquière, as well as a team gold, and won his first individual World Championships at Bala in 1981.

In 1979 Fox enrolled as a physical education student at Birmingham University in England and benefited from one of the early sports scholarship programmes being developed by UK universities such as Bath, Stirling and Birmingham. He received a $10,000 grant in 1980 to suspend his studies and continue his paddle training in preparation for the 1981 World Championships. From 1979 to 1993 Fox won either individual gold or team gold or both, in the K1 Class, at every World Championships except for 1991. At the Barcelona 1992 Summer Olympics, Fox finished fourth in the K1 Slalom. He was awarded an MBE for his services to British sport in the 1986 Birthday Honours.

== World Cup individual podiums ==
	1st place, gold medalist(s)	2nd place, silver medalist(s)	3rd place, bronze medalist(s)	Total
K1	8	5	5	18

Season	Date	Venue	Position	Event
1988	19 June 1988	Wausau	1st	K1
1988	26 June 1988	Savage River	1st	K1
1988	2 July 1988	Minden	1st	K1
1988	7 August 1988	Dublin	3rd	K1
1988	14 August 1988	Nottingham	2nd	K1
1989			1st	K1
1989			1st	K1
1989			2nd	K1
1989	20 August 1989	Tacen	1st	K1
1990	1 July 1990	Wausau	3rd	K1
1990	1990	Savage River	3rd	K1
1990	18 August 1990	Bourg St.-Maurice	2nd	K1
1990	26 August 1990	Tacen	3rd	K1
1991	30 June 1991	Mezzana	1st	K1
1991	6 July 1991	Augsburg	1st	K1
1991	11 July 1991	Reals	2nd	K1
1991	25 August 1991	Minden	3rd	K1
1992	23 February 1992	Launceston	2nd	K1

== Equipment ==
Fox originally paddled Pyranha designed kayaks but when Graham Mackereth and Pyrahna pulled out of composite race boats to focus on the developing plastic, later roto moulded constructions, Fox moved to Mike Dalton and Nomad. Here he had his biggest success paddling the revolutionary Pro Am Extra before moving subsequently into the Extreme. Fox stayed with Nomad until it went bankrupt when he then transferred to Perception where he paddled a Reflex, a newly designed kayak which was launched shortly after Fox joined Perception, with whom he stayed for the remainder of his racing career.

== Post-racing career ==
Fox moved to Australia in 1998 to take up a position as the National Head Coach for the Sydney Olympics. His intervention in a worldwide campaign had been instrumental in preventing canoeing from being axed from the 2000 Sydney Olympics after the Australian Olympic Committee determined there to be inadequate facilities and insufficient funds to address the requirements for hosting an Olympic slalom competition. The result of Fox's campaigning was the construction of the Penrith Whitewater Stadium in western Sydney. From 2001, Fox was also the Australian Institute of Sport and National Team Head Coach leading the slalom team at the 2004 Summer Olympics.

Fox was appointed National Performance Director of Australian Canoeing in January 2005 and was responsible for the Australian Slalom and Sprint High Performance programs up to the 2008 Summer Olympics.

He was a member of the ICF Slalom technical committee from 1996 to 2000 and played an active role in the International Canoe Federation (ICF) campaign to include Slalom in the Sydney 2000 Olympic program. Fox serves as second vice-president of the ICF.

== Family ==
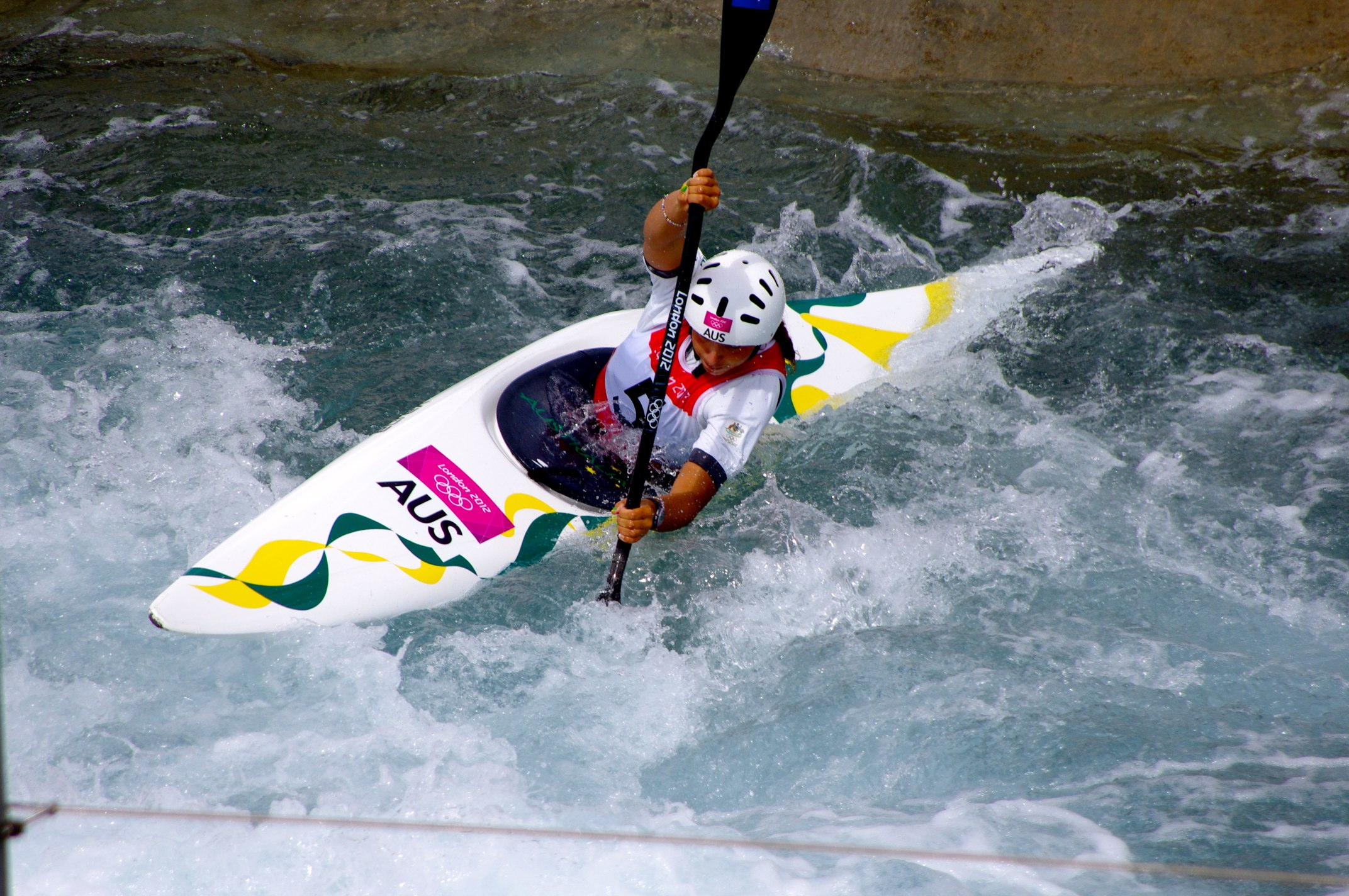
Fox's daughter Jessica Fox, competing at the 2012 Olympics

His wife, Myriam Fox-Jerusalmi, competed as a slalom canoeist for France while his sister Rachel Crosbee competed for Britain in the same event. Fox's daughter Jessica Fox won gold in the girls' K1 slalom event at the 2010 Youth Olympic Games. In the K1 Slalom event at the 2012 Summer Olympics in London, England, Jessica, at the age of 18, gained revenge against the 44-yr-old Czech paddler Štěpánka Hilgertová who had beaten her mother Myriam to the K1 gold medal in the Atlanta Summer Olympics in 1996, sixteen years earlier when Jessica was only 2 years old. Jessica came second in the final of the K1, improving on her mother's bronze from Atlanta 1996 and her father's 4th in Barcelona 1992 to earn the immediate nickname from her teammates and the press of "the Silver Fox". Her father, Richard, was at the end of the course to congratulate her. Jessica's mother Miriam stated in an interview with her daughter after the race, "she's better than I was... there's not another 18-yr-old in the world that's of her standard". Richard was already at the end of his competitive career in 1992 when whitewater slalom canoeing first became a regular Olympic event (it had been a one-off demonstration event at the 1972 Munich Olympics), so it's difficult to assess what his medal tally might have been in Moscow (1980), Los Angeles (1984), and Seoul (1988), but he was 21 when he won his first individual World Championship title, compared to Jessica's Olympic success at 18. Richard and Miriam believed Jessica could go on to eclipse both of them.

Fox's younger daughter Noemie Fox is also a slalom canoeist and Olympic gold medalist.
