= Sylvie Lepeltier =

French canoeist

Medal record

Women's canoe slalom

Representing France

World Championships
Gold medal – first place	1983 Meran	K1 team
Gold medal – first place	1985 Augsburg	K1 team
Gold medal – first place	1993 Mezzana	K1 team
Silver medal – second place	1987 Bourg St.-Maurice	K1 team

Sylvie Lepeltier (born 14 May 1962) is a French slalom canoeist who competed from the late 1970s to the mid-1990s. She won four medals in the K1 team event at the ICF Canoe Slalom World Championships with three golds (1983, 1985, 1993) and a silver (1987).

== World Cup individual podiums ==
Season	Date	Venuea	Position	Event
1988	26 June 1988	Savage River	2nd	K1
1989	20 Aug 1989	Tacen	1st	K1
1991	10 Jul 1991	Reals	2nd	K1
1991	25 Aug 1991	Minden	1st	K1
1991	1 Sep 1991	Wausau	3rd	K1
