= Jérôme Daval =

French slalom canoeist

Medal record

Men's slalom canoeing

Representing France

World Championships
Gold medal – first place	1987 Bourg St.-Maurice	C2 team
Gold medal – first place	1989 Savage River	C2 team
Silver medal – second place	1985 Augsburg	C2 team

Jérôme Daval is a former French slalom canoeist who competed from the mid-1980s to the early 1990s.

He won three medals in the C2 team event at the ICF Canoe Slalom World Championships with two golds (1987, 1989) and a silver (1985). He won all of these medals partnering Michel Saidi.

== World Cup individual podiums ==
Season	Date	Venue	Position	Event
1988	26 June 1988	Savage River	3rd	C2
1988			2nd	C2
1988			3rd	C2
1988	7 August 1988	Dublin	2nd	C2
1988	21 August 1988	Augsburg	3rd	C2
1989	12 Aug 1989	Mezzana	3rd	C2
