= Canoe Slalom World Cup =

Top international circuit of canoe slalom competitions

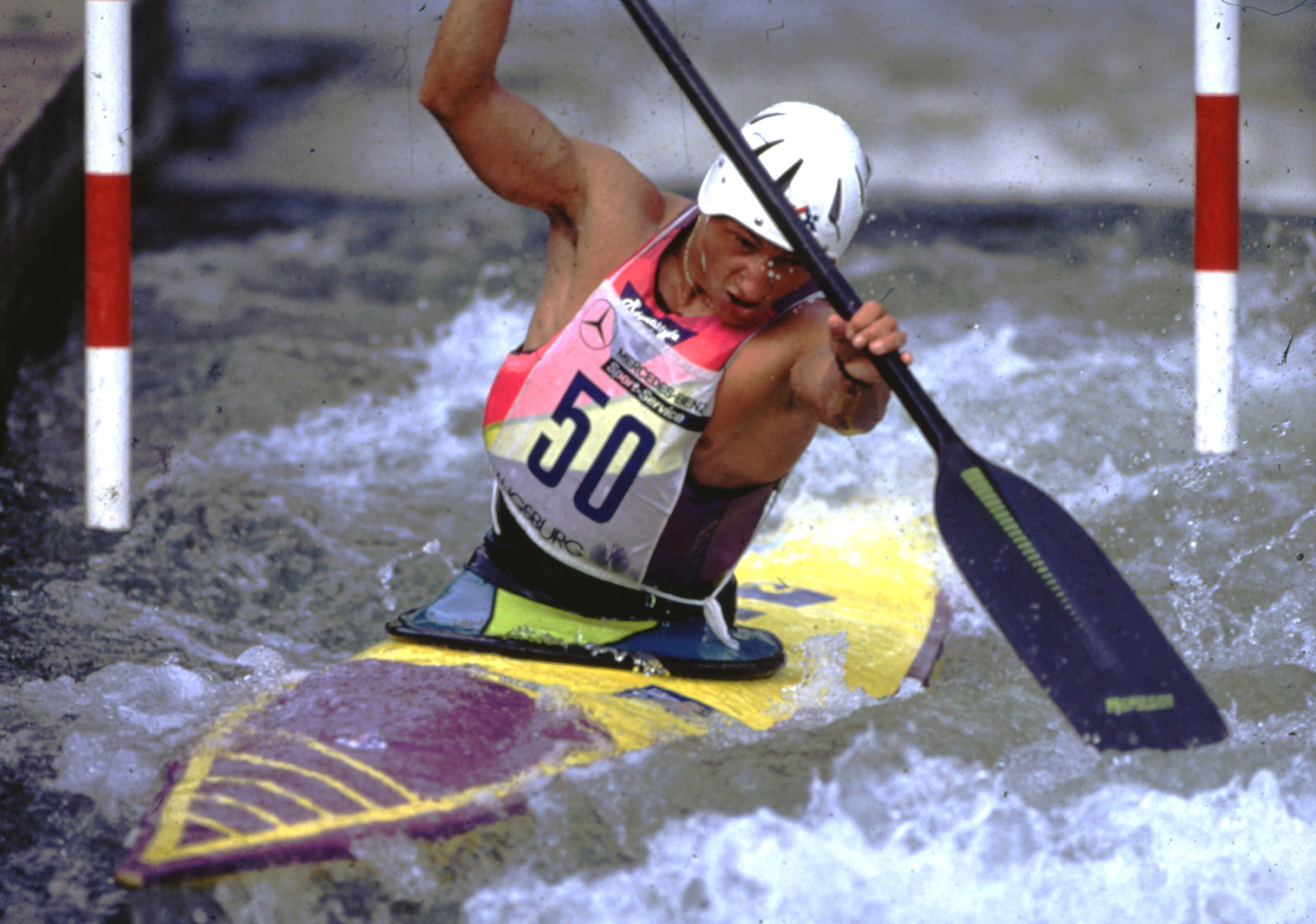
- Thierry Humeau at the Canoe Slalom World Cup in Augsburg, 1990
- Status: active
- Genre: Canoe slalom
- Frequency: Annual
- Location: mostly Europe
- Inaugurated: 1988
- Previous event: 2026
- Next event: 2027
- Organiser: International Canoe Federation (ICF)
- 2026 Canoe Slalom World Cup

The ICF Canoe Slalom World Cup is an annual season-long series of top level races in canoe slalom held under the auspices of the International Canoe Federation. It has been held since 1988 in four canoe and kayak disciplines for men and women. The four original disciplines were men's single canoe (C1), men's double canoe (C2), men's kayak (K1) and women's kayak. A women's single canoe discipline (C1) was added to the world cup in 2010. The men's C2 event was removed from the world cup series in 2018 and it was replaced by the mixed C2 event. The mixed C2 event only lasted for one season, however. 2018 was also the first time that world cup points were awarded for the kayak cross (called extreme K1 at the time). Kayak cross individual (a kayak cross time trial event) was introduced as a separate discipline in 2025. The time trial is simultaneously used as a qualification run for the kayak cross knockout phase.

== Competition format ==
The World Cup is a series of individual races usually taking place during the summer months of June, July, and August. The athlete (or boat) that accumulates the highest number of points from all World Cup races in the given discipline becomes the overall World Cup champion. The scoring system, as well as the number of World Cup races, has changed multiple times over the years. Currently, the winner of a World Cup race receives 60 points (120 points in the World Cup Final). The points awarded for lower positions vary by discipline.

== Venues ==
World Cup races take place mostly in Europe, with the most common stops in Augsburg, Prague, Tacen and La Seu d'Urgell. On rare occasions there were World Cup events on other continents with Penrith being the most visited venue outside of Europe. In the early years the races were sometimes held on natural courses, but only artificial courses have been used in recent years.

== World Cup Champions ==
=== Canoe/Kayak (C1/K1) ===
Season	C1 men	K1 men	C1 women	K1 women
1988	Jon Lugbill (USA)	Richard Fox (GBR)	–	Dana Chladek (USA)
1989	Jon Lugbill (USA)	Richard Fox (GBR)	–	Myriam Jerusalmi (FRA)
1990	Jon Lugbill (USA)	Pierpaolo Ferrazzi (ITA)	–	Myriam Jerusalmi (FRA)
1991	Gareth Marriott (GBR)	Richard Fox (GBR)	–	Myriam Jerusalmi (FRA)
1992	Martin Lang (GER)	Pierpaolo Ferrazzi (ITA)	–	Štěpánka Hilgertová (TCH)
1993	Lukáš Pollert (CZE)	Scott Shipley (USA)	–	Kordula Striepecke (GER)
1994	Gareth Marriott (GBR)	Shaun Pearce (GBR)	–	Lynn Simpson (GBR)
1995	Gareth Marriott (GBR)	Scott Shipley (USA)	–	Lynn Simpson (GBR)
1996	Patrice Estanguet (FRA)	Thomas Becker (GER)	–	Lynn Simpson (GBR)
1997	Patrice Estanguet (FRA)	Scott Shipley (USA)	–	Irena Pavelková (CZE)
1998	Michal Martikán (SVK)	Paul Ratcliffe (GBR)	–	Štěpánka Hilgertová (CZE)
1999	Stanislav Ježek (CZE)	Paul Ratcliffe (GBR)	–	Susanne Hirt (GER)
2000	Michal Martikán (SVK)	Paul Ratcliffe (GBR)	–	Elena Kaliská (SVK)
2001	Michal Martikán (SVK)	Thomas Schmidt (GER)	–	Elena Kaliská (SVK)
2002	Stefan Pfannmöller (GER)	Fabien Lefèvre (FRA)	–	Mandy Planert (GER)
2003	Tony Estanguet (FRA)	David Ford (CAN)	–	Elena Kaliská (SVK)
2004	Tony Estanguet (FRA)	Campbell Walsh (GBR)	–	Elena Kaliská (SVK)
2005	Robin Bell (AUS)	Fabian Dörfler (GER)	–	Elena Kaliská (SVK)
2006	Michal Martikán (SVK)	Erik Pfannmöller (GER)	–	Elena Kaliská (SVK)
2007	Nico Bettge (GER)	Fabian Dörfler (GER)	–	Jasmin Schornberg (GER)
2008	Robin Bell (AUS)	Erik Pfannmöller (GER)	–	Katrina Lawrence (AUS)
2009	David Florence (GBR)	Peter Kauzer (SLO)	–	Jana Dukátová (SVK)
2010	Matej Beňuš (SVK)	Daniele Molmenti (ITA)	Cen Nanqin (CHN)	Jana Dukátová (SVK)
2011	Stanislav Ježek (CZE)	Peter Kauzer (SLO)	Rosalyn Lawrence (AUS)	Jana Dukátová (SVK)
2012	Alexander Slafkovský (SVK)	Étienne Daille (FRA)	Rosalyn Lawrence (AUS)	Urša Kragelj (SLO)
2013	Sideris Tasiadis (GER)	Sebastian Schubert (GER)	Jessica Fox (AUS)	Jana Dukátová (SVK)
2014	Michal Martikán (SVK)	Sebastian Schubert (GER)	Kateřina Hošková (CZE)	Corinna Kuhnle (AUT)
2015	Matej Beňuš (SVK)	Peter Kauzer (SLO)	Jessica Fox (AUS)	Corinna Kuhnle (AUT)
2016	Alexander Slafkovský (SVK)	Mathieu Biazizzo (FRA)	Mallory Franklin (GBR)	Ricarda Funk (GER)
2017	Sideris Tasiadis (GER)	Vít Přindiš (CZE)	Jessica Fox (AUS)	Ricarda Funk (GER)
2018	Alexander Slafkovský (SVK)	Jiří Prskavec (CZE)	Jessica Fox (AUS)	Jessica Fox (AUS)
2019	Matej Beňuš (SVK)	Jiří Prskavec (CZE)	Jessica Fox (AUS)	Jessica Fox (AUS)
2020	Not declared	Not declared	Not declared	Not declared
2021	Denis Gargaud Chanut (FRA)	Vít Přindiš (CZE)	Tereza Fišerová (CZE)	Jessica Fox (AUS)
2022	Nicolas Gestin (FRA)	Jiří Prskavec (CZE)	Tereza Fišerová (CZE)	Jessica Fox (AUS)
2023	Luka Božič (SLO)	Vít Přindiš (CZE)	Jessica Fox (AUS)	Jessica Fox (AUS)
2024	Matej Beňuš (SVK)	Anatole Delassus (FRA)	Jessica Fox (AUS)	Ricarda Funk (GER)
2025	Nicolas Gestin (FRA)	Titouan Castryck (FRA)	Kimberley Woods (GBR)	Kimberley Woods (GBR)
2026	Žiga Lin Hočevar (SLO)	Xabier Ferrazzi (ITA)	Eva Alina Hočevar (SLO)	Jessica Fox (AUS)

=== Discontinued events ===
Season	C2 men	C2 mixed
1988	Lecky Haller/Jamie McEwan (USA)	–
1989	Jérôme Daille/Gilles Lelievre (FRA)	–
1990	Miroslav Šimek/Jiří Rohan (TCH)	–
1991	Miroslav Šimek/Jiří Rohan (TCH)	–
1992	Miroslav Šimek/Jiří Rohan (TCH)	–
1993	Miroslav Šimek/Jiří Rohan (CZE)	–
1994	Miroslav Šimek/Jiří Rohan (CZE)	–
1995	Miroslav Šimek/Jiří Rohan (CZE)	–
1996	Frank Adisson/Wilfrid Forgues (FRA)	–
1997	Frank Adisson/Wilfrid Forgues (FRA)	–
1998	Roman Štrba/Roman Vajs (SVK)	–
1999	Pavol Hochschorner/Peter Hochschorner (SVK)	–
2000	Pavol Hochschorner/Peter Hochschorner (SVK)	–
2001	Pavol Hochschorner/Peter Hochschorner (SVK)	–
2002	Pavol Hochschorner/Peter Hochschorner (SVK)	–
2003	Pavol Hochschorner/Peter Hochschorner (SVK)	–
2004	Pavol Hochschorner/Peter Hochschorner (SVK)	–
2005	Jaroslav Volf/Ondřej Štěpánek (CZE)	–
2006	Pavol Hochschorner/Peter Hochschorner (SVK)	–
2007	Pavol Hochschorner/Peter Hochschorner (SVK)	–
2008	Pavol Hochschorner/Peter Hochschorner (SVK)	–
2009	Ladislav Škantár/Peter Škantár (SVK)	–
2010	Ladislav Škantár/Peter Škantár (SVK)	–
2011	Pavol Hochschorner/Peter Hochschorner (SVK)	–
2012	Pierre Labarelle/Nicolas Peschier (FRA)	–
2013	Gauthier Klauss/Matthieu Péché (FRA)	–
2014	Ladislav Škantár/Peter Škantár (SVK)	–
2015	Gauthier Klauss/Matthieu Péché (FRA)	–
2016	Pierre Picco/Hugo Biso (FRA)	–
2017	Robert Behling/Thomas Becker (GER)	–
2018	–	Tereza Fišerová/Jakub Jáně (CZE)

=== Kayak cross (KX/KXI) ===
Season	Kayak cross men	Kayak cross individual men	Kayak cross women	Kayak cross individual women
2018	Pavel Eigel (RUS)	–	Martina Wegman (NED)	–
2019	Pedro Goncalves (BRA)	–	Ashley Nee (USA)	–
2020	Not declared	–	Not declared	–
2021	Vít Přindiš (CZE)	–	Caroline Trompeter (GER)	–
2022	Vojtěch Heger (CZE)	–	Mallory Franklin (GBR)	–
2023	Joseph Clarke (GBR)	–	Kimberley Woods (GBR)	–
2024	Joseph Clarke (GBR)	–	Kimberley Woods (GBR)	–
2025	Jonny Dickson (GBR)	Sam Leaver (GBR)	Ricarda Funk (GER)	Camille Prigent (FRA)
2026	Jan Rohrer (SUI)	Joseph Clarke (GBR)	Camille Prigent (FRA)	Marjorie Delassus (FRA)

== Overall titles ==
Showing top ten male and female paddlers.

Still active

=== Men ===
Rank	Name	Period	C1	K1	KX	KXI	C2	Total
1	Pavol Hochschorner (SVK)	1996–2017	–	–	–	–	10	10
1	Peter Hochschorner (SVK)	1996–2017	–	–	–	–	10	10
3	Jiří Rohan (CZE)	1983–1997	–	–	–	–	6	6
3	Miroslav Šimek (CZE)	1977–1997	–	–	–	–	6	6
5	Michal Martikán (SVK)	1994–active	5	–	–	–	–	5
6	Vít Přindiš (CZE)	2005–active	–	3	1	–	–	4
6	Matej Beňuš (SVK)	2002–active	4	–	–	–	–	4
8	Jon Lugbill (USA)	1975–1995	3	–	–	–	–	3
8	Richard Fox (GBR)	1977–1993	-	3	–	–	–	3
8	Gareth Marriott (GBR)	1986–1997	3	–	–	–	–	3
8	Scott Shipley (USA)	1988–2004	-	3	–	–	–	3
8	Paul Ratcliffe (GBR)	1990–2004	-	3	–	–	–	3
8	Ladislav Škantár (SVK)	1998–2018	-	–	–	–	3	3
8	Peter Škantár (SVK)	1998–2018	-	–	–	–	3	3
8	Peter Kauzer (SLO)	1999–active	-	3	–	–	–	3
8	Alexander Slafkovský (SVK)	1998–2023	3	–	–	–	–	3
8	Jiří Prskavec (CZE)	2008–active	-	3	–	–	–	3
8	Joseph Clarke (GBR)	2009–active	–	–	2	1	–	3

=== Women ===
Rank	Name	Period	C1	K1	KX	KXI	C2X	Total
1	Jessica Fox (AUS)	2008–active	7	6	–	–	–	13
2	Elena Kaliská (SVK)	1988–2019	–	6	–	–	–	6
3	Jana Dukátová (SVK)	1999–2021	–	4	–	–	–	4
3	Kimberley Woods (GBR)	2011–active	1	1	2	–	–	4
3	Ricarda Funk (GER)	2008–active	–	3	1	–	–	4
6	Myriam Fox-Jerusalmi (FRA)	1979–1996	–	3	–	–	–	3
6	Lynn Simpson (GBR)	1988–1997	–	3	–	–	–	3
6	Tereza Fišerová (CZE)	2013–active	2	–	–	–	1	3
9	Štěpánka Hilgertová (CZE)	1988–2017	–	2	–	–	–	2
9	Rosalyn Lawrence (AUS)	2006–2019	2	–	–	–	–	2
9	Corinna Kuhnle (AUT)	2002–2024	–	2	–	–	–	2
9	Mallory Franklin (GBR)	2010–active	1	–	1	–	–	2
9	Camille Prigent (FRA)	2013–active	–	–	1	1	–	2

== Race wins ==
Showing top ten male and female paddlers by race victories. Statistics are missing several races from 1988 and 1989.

=== Men ===
Rank	Name	Period	C1	K1	KX	KXI	C2	Total
1	Pavol Hochschorner (SVK)	1996–2017	–	–	–	–	30	30
1	Peter Hochschorner (SVK)	1996–2017	–	–	–	–	30	30
3	Jiří Rohan (CZE)	1983–1997	–	–	–	–	20	20
3	Miroslav Šimek (CZE)	1977–1997	–	–	–	–	20	20
3	Michal Martikán (SVK)	1994–active	20	–	–	–	–	20
6	Tony Estanguet (FRA)	1994–2012	18	–	–	–	–	18
7	Peter Kauzer (SLO)	1999–active	-	13	–	–	–	13
8	Jon Lugbill (USA)	1975–1995	11	–	–	–	–	11
8	Frank Adisson (FRA)	1989–2000	–	–	–	–	11	11
8	Wilfrid Forgues (FRA)	1989–2000	–	–	–	–	11	11
8	Paul Ratcliffe (GBR)	1990–2004	-	11	–	–	–	11
8	Scott Shipley (USA)	1988–2004	-	11	–	–	–	11

=== Women ===
Rank	Name	Period	C1	K1	KX	KXI	Total
1	Jessica Fox (AUS)	2008–active	37	20	2	1	60
2	Štěpánka Hilgertová (CZE)	1988–2017	–	20	–	–	20
3	Ricarda Funk (GER)	2008–active	–	13	1	1	15
4	Elena Kaliská (SVK)	1988–2019	–	14	–	–	14
5	Mallory Franklin (GBR)	2010–active	7	1	3	–	11
6	Lynn Simpson (GBR)	1988–1997	–	10	–	–	10
7	Myriam Fox-Jerusalmi (FRA)	1979–1996	–	9	–	–	9
7	Jana Dukátová (SVK)	1999–2021	–	9	–	–	9
7	Kimberley Woods (GBR)	2011–active	4	2	3	–	9
10	Mandy Planert (GER)	1992–2008	–	8	–	–	8
10	Maialen Chourraut (ESP)	2000–active	–	8	–	–	8

== Medals per discipline ==
Showing top ten paddlers by medal record per discipline. Statistics are missing several races from 1988 and 1989.

=== C1 men ===
Rank	Name	1st place, gold medalist(s)	2nd place, silver medalist(s)	3rd place, bronze medalist(s)	Total
1	Michal Martikán (SVK)	20	10	13	43
2	Tony Estanguet (FRA)	18	3	6	27
3	Jon Lugbill (USA)	11	6	0	17
4	Alexander Slafkovský (SVK)	8	13	7	28
5	Gareth Marriott (GBR)	8	5	2	15
6	David Hearn (USA)	7	8	8	23
7	Sideris Tasiadis (GER)	7	4	3	14
8	Lukáš Pollert (CZE)	7	3	4	14
9	Patrice Estanguet (FRA)	6	13	3	22
10	David Florence (GBR)	6	7	8	21

=== K1 men ===
Rank	Name	1st place, gold medalist(s)	2nd place, silver medalist(s)	3rd place, bronze medalist(s)	Total
1	Peter Kauzer (SLO)	13	7	9	29
2	Scott Shipley (USA)	11	5	8	24
3	Paul Ratcliffe (GBR)	11	2	1	14
4	Jiří Prskavec (CZE)	9	5	7	21
5	Vít Přindiš (CZE)	8	6	2	16
6	Richard Fox (GBR)	8	5	5	18
7	Fabien Lefèvre (FRA)	8	3	3	14
8	Daniele Molmenti (ITA)	7	5	1	13
9	Giovanni De Gennaro (ITA)	7	3	4	14
10	Fabian Dörfler (GER)	6	3	2	11

=== Kayak cross men ===
Rank	Name	1st place, gold medalist(s)	2nd place, silver medalist(s)	3rd place, bronze medalist(s)	Total
1	Joseph Clarke (GBR)	4	2	3	9
2	Boris Neveu (FRA)	3	1	1	5
2	Manuel Ochoa (ESP)	3	1	1	5
3	Pavel Eigel (RUS)	3	0	0	3
4	Pedro Goncalves (BRA)	2	2	4	8
6	Mathurin Madoré (FRA)	2	0	4	6
7	Stefan Hengst (GER)	2	0	3	5
8	Etienne Chappell (GBR)	2	0	0	2
9	Vít Přindiš (CZE)	1	5	0	6
10	Finn Butcher (NZL)	1	3	1	5

=== Kayak cross individual men ===
Rank	Name	1st place, gold medalist(s)	2nd place, silver medalist(s)	3rd place, bronze medalist(s)	Total
1	Joseph Clarke (GBR)	3	1	0	4
2	Jakub Krejčí (CZE)	1	2	1	4
2	Sam Leaver (GBR)	1	2	1	4
4	Manuel Ochoa (ESP)	1	2	0	3
5	Mathurin Madoré (FRA)	1	1	1	3
6	Giovanni De Gennaro (ITA)	1	0	1	2
6	Gabriel De Coster (BEL)	1	0	1	2
8	Jonny Dickson (GBR)	1	0	0	1
9	Jan Rohrer (SUI)	0	1	0	1
9	Egor Smirnov (AIN)	0	1	0	1

=== C1 women ===
Rank	Name	1st place, gold medalist(s)	2nd place, silver medalist(s)	3rd place, bronze medalist(s)	Total
1	Jessica Fox (AUS)	37	9	3	49
2	Mallory Franklin (GBR)	7	8	6	21
3	Núria Vilarrubla (ESP)	4	5	3	12
4	Kimberley Woods (GBR)	4	4	7	15
5	Rosalyn Lawrence (AUS)	4	4	3	11
6	Gabriela Satková (CZE)	3	4	1	8
7	Ana Sátila (BRA)	3	2	4	9
8	Caroline Loir (FRA)	3	2	1	6
9	Cen Nanqin (CHN)	3	0	1	4
10	Tereza Fišerová (CZE)	2	4	4	10

=== K1 women ===
Rank	Name	1st place, gold medalist(s)	2nd place, silver medalist(s)	3rd place, bronze medalist(s)	Total
1	Štěpánka Hilgertová (CZE)	20	12	15	47
2	Jessica Fox (AUS)	20	12	3	35
3	Elena Kaliská (SVK)	14	9	9	32
4	Ricarda Funk (GER)	13	5	7	25
5	Lynn Simpson (GBR)	10	1	1	12
6	Jana Dukátová (SVK)	9	11	4	24
7	Myriam Fox-Jerusalmi (FRA)	9	9	5	23
8	Mandy Planert (GER)	8	13	3	24
9	Maialen Chourraut (ESP)	8	5	4	17
10	Corinna Kuhnle (AUT)	5	8	3	16

=== Kayak cross women ===
Rank	Name	1st place, gold medalist(s)	2nd place, silver medalist(s)	3rd place, bronze medalist(s)	Total
1	Kimberley Woods (GBR)	3	4	1	8
2	Martina Wegman (NED)	3	2	0	5
3	Mallory Franklin (GBR)	3	0	1	4
4	Veronika Vojtová (CZE)	3	0	0	3
5	Ana Sátila (BRA)	2	3	2	7
6	Tereza Kneblová (CZE)	2	3	0	5
7	Camille Prigent (FRA)	2	2	0	4
8	Jessica Fox (AUS)	2	0	3	5
9	Angèle Hug (FRA)	2	0	2	4
10	Alsu Minazova (RUS)	2	0	1	3

=== Kayak cross individual women ===
Rank	Name	1st place, gold medalist(s)	2nd place, silver medalist(s)	3rd place, bronze medalist(s)	Total
1	Camille Prigent (FRA)	3	2	0	5
2	Lois Leaver (GBR)	2	0	0	2
3	Ricarda Funk (GER)	1	2	0	3
4	Marjorie Delassus (FRA)	1	1	1	3
5	Jessica Fox (AUS)	1	0	1	2
6	Miren Lazkano (ESP)	1	0	0	1
6	Kateřina Beková (CZE)	1	0	0	1
8	Tereza Kneblová (CZE)	0	2	0	2
9	Angèle Hug (FRA)	0	1	2	3
10	Eva Alina Hočevar (SLO)	0	1	1	2

=== C2 men ===
Rank	Name	1st place, gold medalist(s)	2nd place, silver medalist(s)	3rd place, bronze medalist(s)	Total
1	Pavol Hochschorner (SVK)	30	11	3	44
1	Peter Hochschorner (SVK)	30	11	3	44
3	Jiří Rohan (CZE)	20	10	2	32
3	Miroslav Šimek (CZE)	20	10	2	32
5	Frank Adisson (FRA)	11	6	6	23
5	Wilfrid Forgues (FRA)	11	6	6	23
7	Ladislav Škantár (SVK)	9	5	7	21
7	Peter Škantár (SVK)	9	5	7	21
9	Marek Jiras (CZE)	8	11	7	26
9	Tomáš Máder (CZE)	8	11	7	26

=== C2 mixed ===
Rank	Name	1st place, gold medalist(s)	2nd place, silver medalist(s)	3rd place, bronze medalist(s)	Total
1	Tereza Fišerová (CZE)	2	2	0	4
1	Jakub Jáně (CZE)	2	2	0	4
3	Soňa Stanovská (SVK)	1	1	0	2
3	Ján Bátik (SVK)	1	1	0	2
5	Veronika Vojtová (CZE)	1	0	2	3
5	Jan Mašek (CZE)	1	0	2	3
7	Jasmin Schornberg (GER)	1	0	0	1
7	Thomas Becker (GER)	1	0	0	1
9	Yves Prigent (FRA)	0	2	1	3
9	Margaux Henry (FRA)	0	2	1	3

== Overall titles per country ==
As of the end of the 2026 season.

	Nation	C1 men	C1 women	C2 men	C2 mixed	K1 men	K1 women	KX men	KX women	KXI men	KXI women	Total
1	Slovakia	12		14			10					36
2	Great Britain	4	2			8	4	3	3	2		26
3	France	7		7		5	3		1		2	25
4	Germany	5		1		8	7		2			23
5	Czech Republic	3	3	4	1	6	2	2				21
6	Australia	2	9				7					18
7	United States	3		1		3	1		1			9
8	Slovenia	2	1			3	1					7
9	Czechoslovakia			3			1					4
9	Italy					4						4
11	Austria						2					2
12	China		1									1
12	Canada					1						1
12	Russia							1				1
12	Brazil							1				1
12	Netherlands								1			1
12	Switzerland							1				1

== Venue usage ==
49 unique venues have held a Canoe Slalom World Cup between 1988 and 2026. This includes those that have held the World Championships or Continental Championships which counted towards world cup points (2005–2010 and 2018). As of 2008, a world cup has been held on every inhabited continent.

Venue	Events held
Augsburg, Germany	27
Tacen, Slovenia; La Seu d'Urgell, Spain; Prague, Czech Republic	23
Bratislava, Slovakia; Pau, France	8
Wausau, United States; Bourg-Saint-Maurice, France; Penrith, Australia	6
Minden, Canada; Ocoee, United States	5
Markkleeberg, Germany; Kraków, Poland	4
Nottingham, UK; Mezzana, Italy; Merano, Italy; Athens, Greece; Mangahao, New Zealand; Liptovský Mikuláš, Slovakia; Ivrea, Italy	3
South Bend, United States; Savage River, United States; Lofer, Austria; L'Argentière-la-Bessée, France; Cardiff, UK; Lee Valley, UK; Vaires-sur-Marne, France	2
Dublin, Ireland; Réals, France; Murupara, New Zealand; Launceston, Australia; Asahi, Aichi, Japan; Três Coroas, Brazil; Björbo, Sweden; Saint-Pé-de-Bigorre, France; Goumois, France; Guangzhou, China; Tibagi, Brazil; Naein-chun, South Korea; Kern River, United States; Madawaska, Canada; Zhangjiajie, China; Foz do Iguaçu, Brazil; Sagana, Kenya; Charlotte, United States; Nakhon Nayok, Thailand; Kananaskis, Canada; Xiasi, China; Rio de Janeiro, Brazil	1

== See also ==
- Canoe slalom
- ICF Canoe Slalom World Championships
- Canoeing at the Summer Olympics
- Canoe World Cup
- ICF Canoe Slalom World Rankings
