= Dana Chladek =

American kayaker

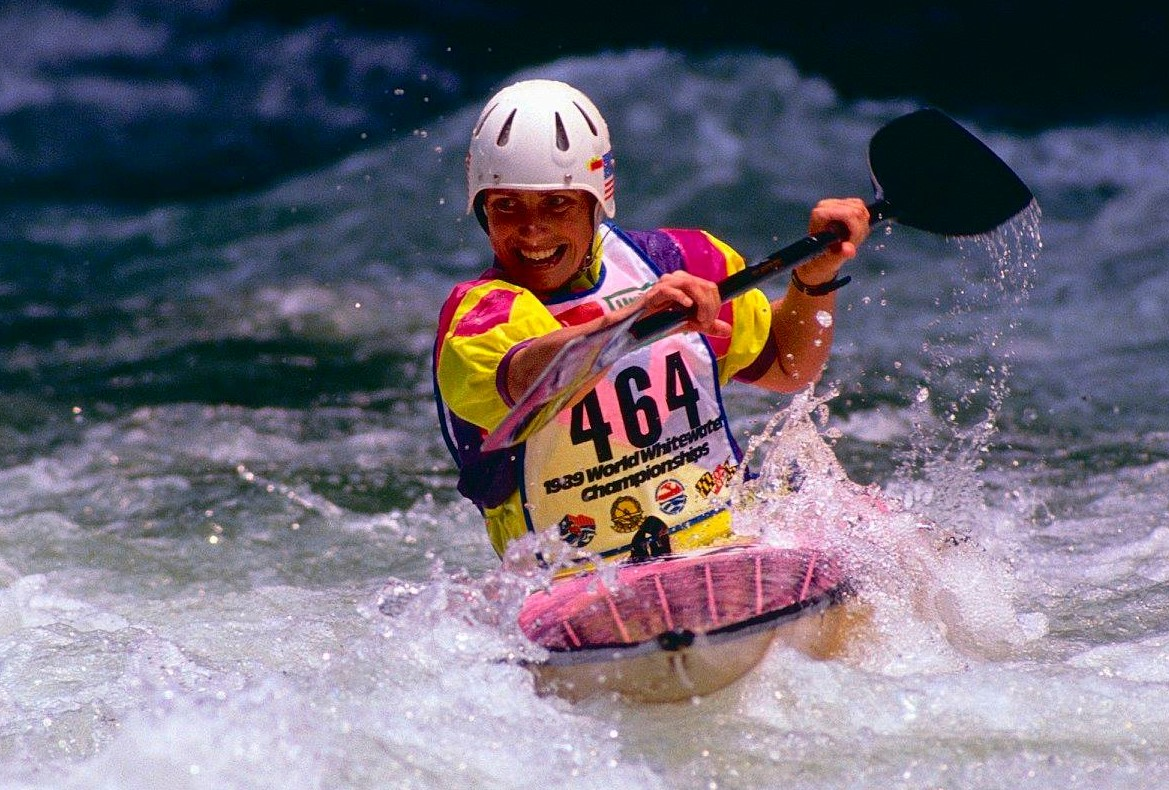

Personal information
- Nationality: American
- Born: Dana Chládková; December 27, 1963 (age 62) Děčín, Czechoslovakia
Medal record
Women's canoe slalom
Representing United States
Olympic Games
Silver medal – second place	1996 Atlanta	K1
Bronze medal – third place	1992 Barcelona	K1
World Championships
Silver medal – second place	1989 Savage River	K1
Silver medal – second place	1989 Savage River	K1 team
Silver medal – second place	1991 Tacen	K1
Silver medal – second place	1993 Mezzana	K1 team
Bronze medal – third place	1987 Bourg St.-Maurice	K1 team
Bronze medal – third place	1991 Tacen	K1 team

Dana Chladek (born Dana Chládková on December 27, 1963) is a Czech-born American slalom kayaker. She competed from the early 1980s to the mid-1990s. Competing in two Summer Olympics, she won two medals in the K1 event with a silver in 1996 and a bronze in 1992.

Chladek also won six medals at the ICF Canoe Slalom World Championships with four silvers (K1: 1989, 1991; K1 team: 1989, 1993) and two bronzes (K1 team: 1987, 1991). In 1988 she won the inaugural edition of the World Cup series.

AFter she ended her active career, Dana Chladek became a coach and race director for the Potomac Whitewater Racing Center. Chladek and her team of coaches oversee whitewater training programs for young people who are intent on pursuing high levels of excellence, including Olympic and World Cup level competition. Chladek's program is based on the Potomac River in the Washington, D.C. area. Chladek's hand-picked coaching team is the highest level provided in the United States.

== World Cup individual podiums ==
Season	Date	Venue	Position	Event
1988	19 June 1988	Wausau	2nd	K1
1988			3rd	K1
1988	14 August 1988	Nottingham	3rd	K1
1988	21 August 1988	Augsburg	1st	K1
1989	12 Aug 1989	Mezzana	2nd	K1
1990	1 Jul 1990	Wausau	2nd	K1
1990	1990	Savage River	2nd	K1
1991	30 Jun 1991	Mezzana	2nd	K1
