= Melvyn Jones =

British slalom canoeist (born 1964)

Medal record

Men's canoe slalom

Representing Great Britain

World Championships
Gold medal – first place	1987 Bourg St.-Maurice	K1 team
Gold medal – first place	1993 Mezzana	K1 team
Bronze medal – third place	1993 Mezzana	K1

Melvyn Jones (born 26 January 1964 in Stourbridge) is a British slalom canoeist who competed from the mid-1980s to the mid-1990s.

== Early life ==
In 1992 he was a sales manager from Gamston, Rushcliffe.

== Career ==
He won three medals at the ICF Canoe Slalom World Championships with two golds (K1 team: 1987, 1993) and a bronze (K1: 1993).

Jones also finished seventh in the K1 event at the 1992 Summer Olympics in Barcelona.

His wife, Elisabeth, won a gold medal for Germany in the women's K1 event at those same games.

== World Cup individual podiums ==
Season	Date	Venue	Position	Event
1988	26 June 1988	Savage River	2nd	K1
1988	2 July 1988	Minden	2nd	K1
1988	14 August 1988	Nottingham	1st	K1
1991	6 Jul 1991	Augsburg	2nd	K1
1991	1 Sep 1991	Wausau	3rd	K1
1992	16 Feb 1992	Murupara	3rd	K1
1992	23 Feb 1992	Launceston	1st	K1
1993	21 Aug 1993	Minden	1st	K1
