= Gilles Lelievre =

French canoeist

Medal record

Men's canoe slalom

Representing France

World Championships
Gold medal – first place	1987 Bourg St.-Maurice	C2 team
Gold medal – first place	1989 Savage River	C2 team
Gold medal – first place	1991 Tacen	C2 team

Gilles Lelievre is a French slalom canoeist who competed from the late 1980s to the mid-1990s. He won three gold medals in the C2 team event at the ICF Canoe Slalom World Championships, earning them in 1987, 1989 and 1991.

He also won the overall World Cup title in C2 in 1989.

His boat partner for the duration of his active career was Jérôme Daille.

== World Cup individual podiums ==
	1st place, gold medalist(s)	2nd place, silver medalist(s)	3rd place, bronze medalist(s)	Total
C2	4	6	1	11

Season	Date	Venue	Position	Event
1988	26 June 1988	Savage River	1st	C2
1989			1st	C2
1989			1st	C2
1989			2nd	C2
1989	12 Aug 1989	Mezzana	2nd	C2
1989	20 Aug 1989	Tacen	3rd	C2
1990	18 Aug 1990	Bourg St.-Maurice	2nd	C2
1991	30 Jun 1991	Mezzana	2nd	C2
1991	6 Jul 1991	Augsburg	2nd	C2
1991	11 Jul 1991	Reals	2nd	C2
1993	18 Jul 1993	La Seu d'Urgell	1st	C2
