= Karen Like =

British slalom canoeist (born 1966)

Medal record

Women's canoe slalom

Representing Great Britain

World Championships
Bronze medal – third place	1985 Augsburg	K-1 team

Karen Theresa Like (born 14 October 1966 in Cinderford) is a British slalom canoeist who competed from the mid-1980s to the early 1990s.

== Early life ==
Karen Davies grew up in Broadwell, Forest of Dean.

She trained with Yat Racers Canoe Club at Symonds Yat Rapids. She lived at Ruardean in the 1990s. She had a daughter Emily in February 1993.

== Career ==
She won a bronze medal in the K1 team event at the 1985 ICF Canoe Slalom World Championships in Augsburg. She also finished 13th in the K1 event at the 1992 Summer Olympics in Barcelona.

=== World Cup individual podiums ===
Season	Date	Venue	Position	Event
1988	26 June 1988	Savage River	3rd	K1
