= Myriam Fox-Jerusalmi =

French canoeist

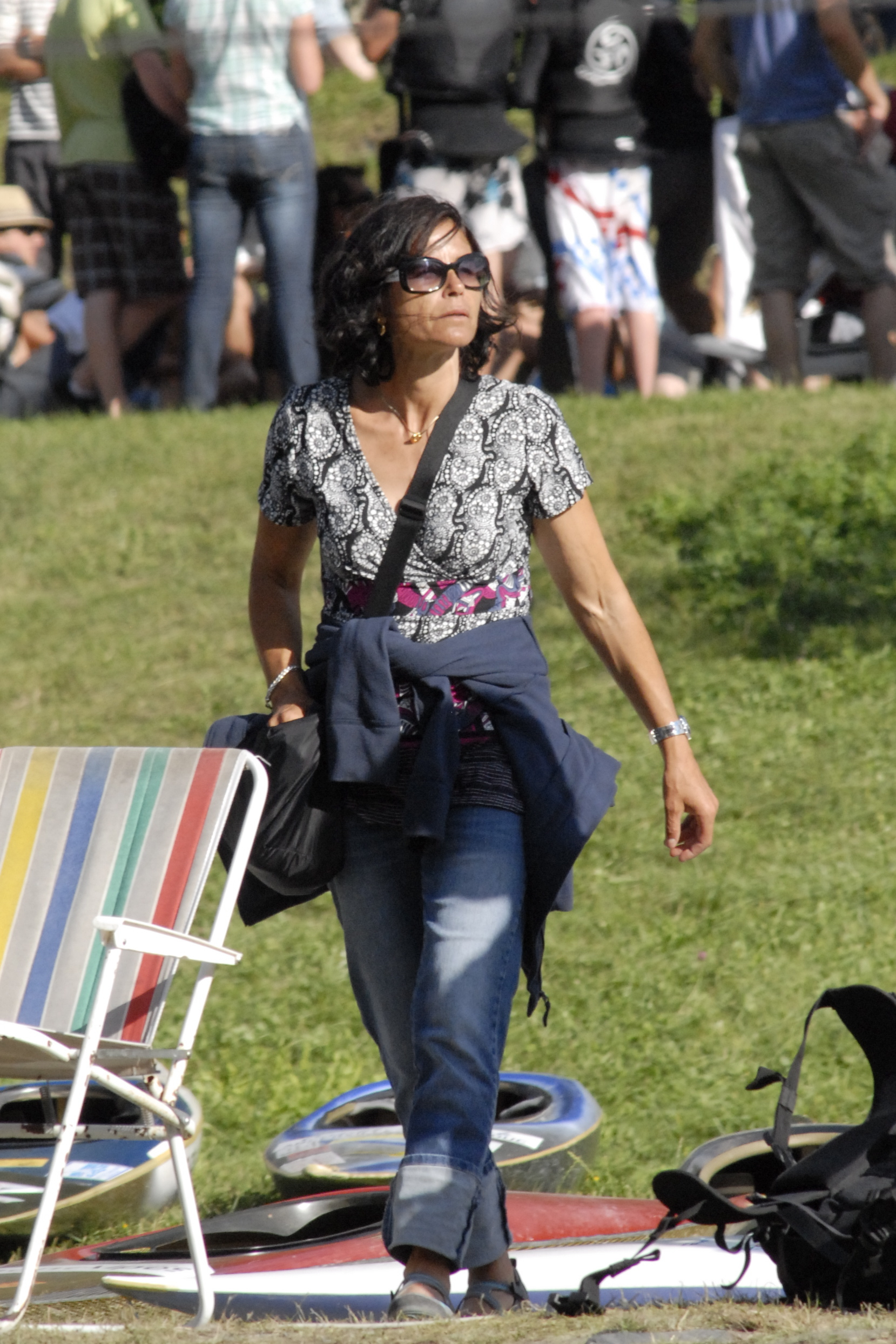
- Fox-Jerusalmi in 2010

Personal information
- Born: Myriam Jerusalmi; 24 October 1961 (age 64) Marseille, France
- Spouse: Richard Fox
- Children: Jessica Fox; Noemie Fox
Medal record
Women's canoe slalom
Event	1st	2nd	3rd
Olympic Games	0	0	1
World Championships	8	2	0
Total	8	2	1
Representing France
Olympic Games
Bronze medal – third place	1996 Atlanta	K1
World Championships
Gold medal – first place	1983 Meran	K1 team
Gold medal – first place	1985 Augsburg	K1 team
Gold medal – first place	1989 Savage River	K1
Gold medal – first place	1989 Savage River	K1 team
Gold medal – first place	1991 Tacen	K1 team
Gold medal – first place	1993 Mezzana	K1
Gold medal – first place	1993 Mezzana	K1 team
Gold medal – first place	1995 Nottingham	K1 team
Silver medal – second place	1987 Bourg St.-Maurice	K1
Silver medal – second place	1987 Bourg St.-Maurice	K1 team

Myriam Fox-Jerusalmi (née Jerusalmi; born 24 October 1961) is a former French slalom canoeist who competed at the international level from 1979 to 1996.

== Career ==
Competing in two Summer Olympics, she won a bronze medal in the K1 event in Atlanta in 1996.

Fox-Jerusalmi also won ten medals at the ICF Canoe Slalom World Championships with eight golds (K1: 1989, 1993; K1 team: 1983, 1985, 1989, 1991, 1993, 1995) and two silvers (K1: 1987; K1 team: 1987).

She won the overall World Cup title three consecutive times between 1989 and 1991.

In 2018, she won the Coach of the Year at the AIS Sport Performance Awards.

== World Cup individual podiums ==
	1st place, gold medalist(s)	2nd place, silver medalist(s)	3rd place, bronze medalist(s)	Total
K1	9	9	5	23

Season	Date	Venue	Position	Event
1988	19 June 1988	Wausau	3rd	K1
1988			2nd	K1
1988	7 August 1988	Dublin	3rd	K1
1988	14 August 1988	Nottingham	2nd	K1
1988	21 August 1988	Augsburg	2nd	K1
1989			1st	K1
1989			1st	K1
1989			2nd	K1
1989	15 August 1989	Augsburg	2nd	K1
1989	20 August 1989	Tacen	3rd	K1
1990	1 July 1990	Wausau	1st	K1
1990	1990	Savage River	1st	K1
1990	18 August 1990	Bourg St.-Maurice	2nd	K1
1991	30 June 1991	Mezzana	1st	K1
1991	7 July 1991	Augsburg	2nd	K1
1991	10 July 1991	Reals	1st	K1
1991	1 September 1991	Wausau	1st	K1
1992	16 February 1992	Murupara	1st	K1
1992	23 February 1992	Launceston	3rd	K1
1993	25 July 1993	Lofer	2nd	K1
1993	1 August 1993	Augsburg	1st	K1
1993	31 August 1993	Ocoee	2nd	K1
1995	1 October 1995	Ocoee	3rd	K1

== Personal life ==
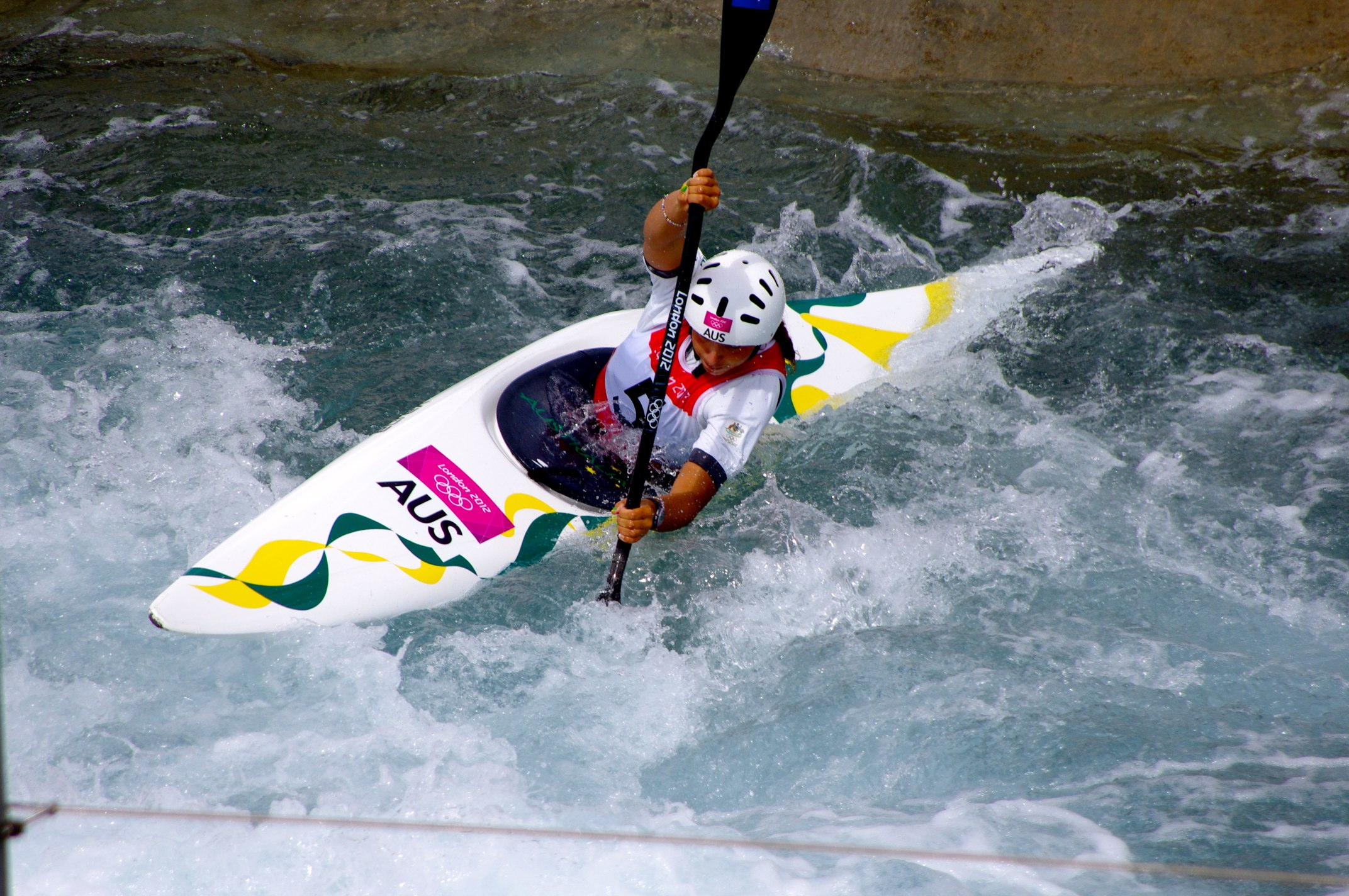
Fox-Jerusalmi's daughter Jessica Fox, competing at the 2012 Olympics

Her husband, Richard, competed for Great Britain in slalom canoeing, and later coached Australia in the same event. Fox-Jerusalmi's husband is also an executive officer in the International Canoe Federation. Their daughter, Jessica Fox won gold in the girls' K1 slalom event at the 2010 Summer Youth Olympics in Singapore, four Olympic medals, and sixteen World Championship medals as of 2022. Competing for Australia in the 2012 Olympics, Jessica won the K1 slalom silver medal. Her younger daughter Noemie Fox is also a slalom canoeist. Myriam's sister-in-law Rachel Crosbee also competed in canoe slalom.

Fox-Jerusalmi is Jewish.

== See also ==
- List of select Jewish canoers
