= Jérôme Daille =

French slalom canoeist

Medal record

Men's slalom canoeing

Representing France

World Championships
| Gold medal – first place | 1987 Bourg St.-Maurice | C2 team |
| Gold medal – first place | 1989 Savage River | C2 team |
| Gold medal – first place | 1991 Tacen | C2 team |

Jérôme Daille is a French slalom canoeist who competed from the late 1980s to the late 1990s. He won three gold medals in the C2 team event at the ICF Canoe Slalom World Championships, earning them in 1987, 1989 and 1991.

He also won the overall World Cup title in C2 in 1989.

His partner in the boat for most of his active career was Gilles Lelievre.

== World Cup individual podiums ==
| | 1st place, gold medalist(s) | 2nd place, silver medalist(s) | 3rd place, bronze medalist(s) | Total |
| C2 | 4 | 6 | 1 | 11 |

| Season | Date | Venue | Position | Event |
|---|---|---|---|---|
| 1988 | 26 June 1988 | Savage River | 1st | C2 |
| 1989 | | | 1st | C2 |
| 1989 | | | 1st | C2 |
| 1989 | | | 2nd | C2 |
| 1989 | 12 Aug 1989 | Mezzana | 2nd | C2 |
| 1989 | 20 Aug 1989 | Tacen | 3rd | C2 |
| 1990 | 18 Aug 1990 | Bourg St.-Maurice | 2nd | C2 |
| 1991 | 30 Jun 1991 | Mezzana | 2nd | C2 |
| 1991 | 6 Jul 1991 | Augsburg | 2nd | C2 |
| 1991 | 11 Jul 1991 | Reals | 2nd | C2 |
| 1993 | 18 Jul 1993 | La Seu d'Urgell | 1st | C2 |
