= Laurent Brissaud =

French canoeist

Medal record

Men's canoe slalom

Representing France

World Championships
Bronze medal – third place	1987 Bourg St.-Maurice	K1 team

Laurent Brissaud (born 10 December 1965 in Valence, Drôme) is a French slalom canoeist.

== Career ==
Brissaud competed from the mid-1980s to the early 1990s. He won a bronze medal in the K1 team event at the 1987 ICF Canoe Slalom World Championships in Bourg-Saint-Maurice.

He also finished fifth in the K1 event at the 1992 Summer Olympics in Barcelona.

== World Cup individual podiums ==
Season	Date	Venue	Position	Event
1988	19 June 1988	Wausau	2nd	K1
1988	26 June 1988	Savage River	3rd	K1
1988	14 August 1988	Nottingham	3rd	K1
1989	15 Aug 1989	Augsburg	3rd	K1
