= Michel Saidi =

French Canoe slalom racer

Medal record

Men's canoe slalom

Representing France

World Championships
Gold medal – first place	1987 Bourg St.-Maurice	C2 team
Gold medal – first place	1989 Savage River	C2 team
Silver medal – second place	1985 Augsburg	C2 team

Michel Saidi is a former French slalom canoeist who competed from the early 1980s to the early 1990s.

He won three medals in the C2 team event at the ICF Canoe Slalom World Championships with two golds (1987, 1989) and a silver (1985). He won all of these medals partnering Jérôme Daval.

== World Cup individual podiums ==
Season	Date	Venue	Position	Event
1988	26 June 1988	Savage River	3rd	C2
1988			2nd	C2
1988			3rd	C2
1988	7 August 1988	Dublin	2nd	C2
1988	21 August 1988	Augsburg	3rd	C2
1989	12 Aug 1989	Mezzana	3rd	C2
