= Thomas Loose =

Medal record

Men's canoe slalom

World Championships

Representing West Germany
Gold medal – first place	1989 Savage River	C2
Bronze medal – third place	1987 Bourg St.-Maurice	C2 team
Bronze medal – third place	1989 Savage River	C2 team

Representing Germany
Bronze medal – third place	1991 Tacen	C2 team

Thomas Loose (born 19 January 1964 in Bottrop) is a West German-German slalom canoeist who competed from the mid-1980s to the early 1990s. He won a gold medal for West Germany in the C2 event at the 1989 ICF Canoe Slalom World Championships in Savage River, Maryland in the United States. He also won three bronze medals at the ICF Canoe Slalom World Championships in the C2 team event (1987, 1989, 1991).

Loose competed for Germany at the 1992 Summer Olympics in Barcelona, finishing 13th in the C2 event.

His partner in the boat throughout the whole of his career was Frank Hemmer.

== World Cup individual podiums ==
Season	Date	Venue	Position	Event
1988	7 August 1988	Dublin	1st	C2
1988	14 August 1988	Nottingham	2nd	C2
1988	21 August 1988	Augsburg	1st	C2
1989	15 Aug 1989	Augsburg	3rd	C2
1992	31 May 1992	Nottingham	2nd	C2
