= Elizabeth Sharman =

British canoeist (born 1957)

Medal record

Women's canoe slalom

Representing Great Britain

World Championships
Gold medal – first place	1983 Meran	K-1
Gold medal – first place	1987 Bourg St.-Maurice	K-1
Silver medal – second place	1979 Jonquière	K-1
Silver medal – second place	1981 Bala	K-1 team
Silver medal – second place	1983 Meran	K-1 team
Bronze medal – third place	1985 Augsburg	K-1 team

Elizabeth St Clare Sharman (born 8 August 1957, in Bolton), sometimes known as Liz Sharman, is a former British slalom and sprint canoeist who competed from the late 1970s to the late 1980s. She won six medals at the ICF Canoe Slalom World Championships with two golds (K-1: 1983, 1987), three silvers (K-1: 1979; K-1 team: 1981, 1983) and a bronze (K-1 team: 1985).

Sharman also competed in sprint canoeing in the K-2 500 m event at the 1988 Summer Olympics in Seoul, but was eliminated in the semifinals.

Sharman was awarded a Member of the Most Excellent Order of the British Empire (MBE) by Queen Elizabeth II on 13 December 1989.

== World Cup individual podiums ==
Season	Date	Venue	Position	Event
1988	26 June 1988	Savage River	1st	K1
1988	7 August 1988	Dublin	1st	K1
