= Jed Prentice =

American slalom canoeist

Medal record

Men's canoe slalom

Representing United States

World Championships
Gold medal – first place	1989 Savage River	C1 team
Gold medal – first place	1991 Tacen	C1 team

Junior World Championships
Gold medal – first place	1986 Spittal	C1

Jed Prentice (born 1968) is an American slalom canoeist who competed at the international level from 1986 to 1994.

He won two gold medals in the C1 team event at the ICF Canoe Slalom World Championships, earning them in 1989 and 1991.

== World Cup individual podiums ==
Season	Date	Venue	Position	Event
1988	19 June 1988	Wausau	2nd	C1
1988	26 June 1988	Savage River	3rd	C1
1988	2 July 1988	Minden	1st	C1
1988	7 August 1988	Dublin	1st	C1
1988	14 August 1988	Nottingham	3rd	C1
1988	21 August 1988	Augsburg	3rd	C1
1991	25 Aug 1991	Minden	3rd	C1
1991	1 Sep 1991	Wausau	3rd	C1
