= Richard Weiss =

West German athlete

Medal record

Men's canoe slalom

Representing United States

World Championships
Silver medal – second place	1993 Mezzana	K1

Richard Alfred Weiss (September 18, 1963 – June 25, 1997), known as Rich Weiss, was a West German-born, American slalom kayaker who competed from the mid-1980s to the mid-1990s. He won a silver medal in the K1 event at the 1993 ICF Canoe Slalom World Championships in Mezzana.

Weiss also competed in two Summer Olympics, earning his best finish of sixth in the K1 event in Atlanta in 1996. His finish in the 1992 Olympics in Barcelona was mired in controversy when the television replay showed a judge's error cost him a bronze medal.

Weiss was born in Munich, and earned a B.S. in Geological Engineering from the Colorado School of Mines, an M.S. in hydrogeology from Penn State University, and a Ph.D. in Geological Sciences at the University of British Columbia. He founded and owned an environmental consulting company, Weisswater Associates.

He drowned in a kayaking accident on the White Salmon River in Washington state in 1997. Preparing for a race with a friend, he unsuccessfully attempted to run Big Brother, a Class-V rapid with a 30-foot waterfall. His wife, Rosi, gave birth soon afterwards to a boy whom she named "River". The accidental death of a world-class paddler was the subject of much reflection and soul-searching in the whitewater community. The town of Steamboat Springs, Colorado dedicated a park, with a statue, in his honor.

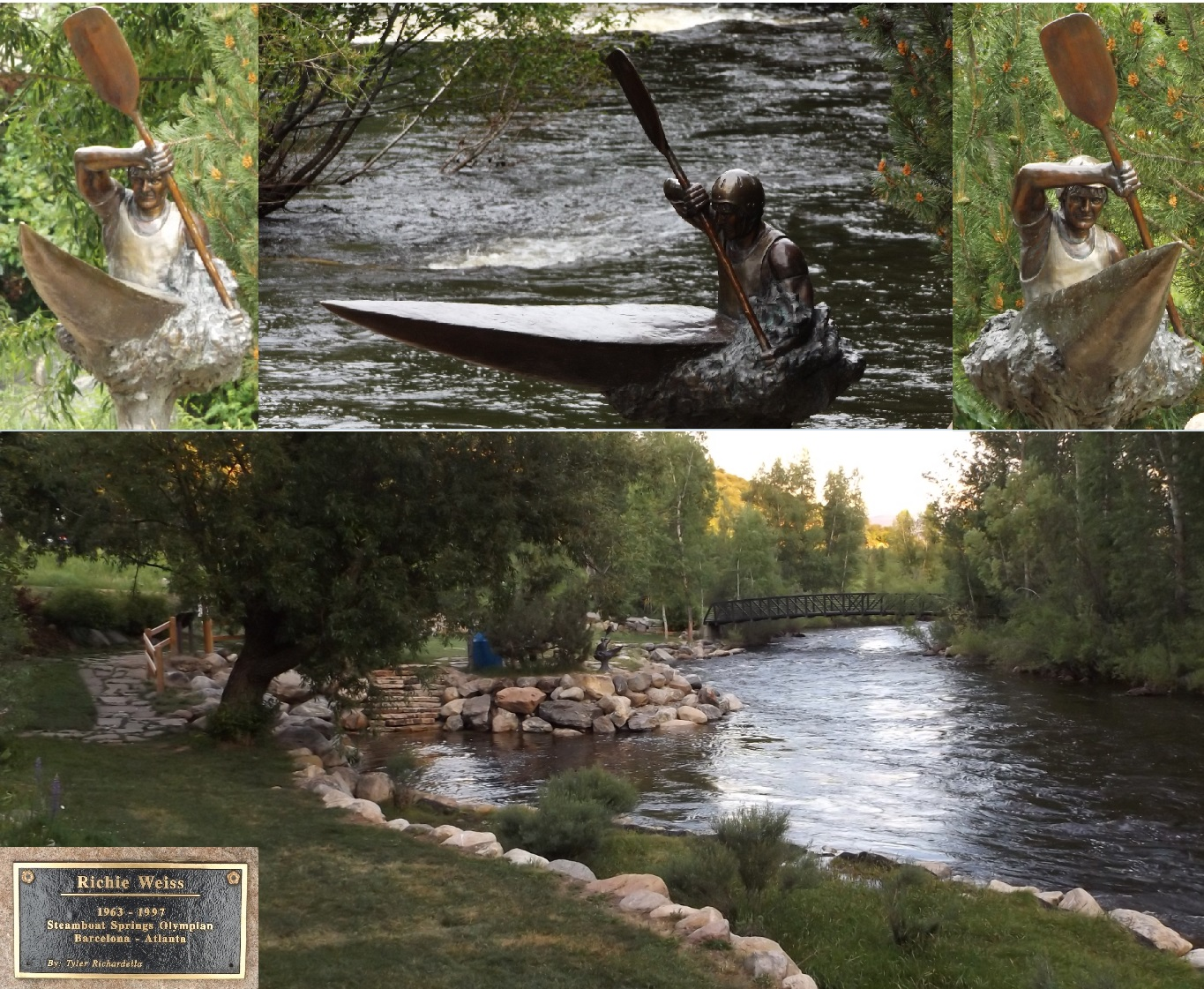
Bronze Statue of Richard Weiss by Tyler Mark Richardella

== World Cup individual podiums ==
Season	Date	Venue	Position	Event
1988	19 June 1988	Wausau	3rd	K1
1991	25 Aug 1991	Minden	1st	K1
1991	1 Sep 1991	Wausau	2nd	K1

== See also ==
List of Pennsylvania State University Olympians
