= Michael Seibert =

Michael Seibert may refer to:

- Michael Seibert (canoeist), German slalom canoeist
- Michael Seibert (figure skater) (born 1960), American figure skater
