= Milan Kučera =

Milan Kucera may refer to:

- Milan Kučera (canoeist) (born 1963), Slovak slalom canoer
- Milan Kučera (Nordic combined) (born 1974), Czech Nordic combined skier
