= Marie-Françoise Grange-Prigent =

French canoeist (born 1961)

Medal record

Women's Canoe slalom

Representing France

World Championships
| Gold medal – first place | 1983 Meran | K1 team |
| Gold medal – first place | 1985 Augsburg | K1 team |
| Gold medal – first place | 1989 Savage River | K1 team |
| Silver medal – second place | 1985 Augsburg | K1 |
| Silver medal – second place | 1987 Bourg St.-Maurice | K1 team |
| Bronze medal – third place | 1983 Meran | K1 |

Marie-Françoise Grange-Prigent (born 9 June 1961) is a French slalom canoeist who competed from the early 1980s to the early 1990s. She won six medals at the ICF Canoe Slalom World Championships with three golds (K1 team: 1983, 1985, 1989) two silvers (K1: 1985, K1 team: 1987) and a bronze (K1: 1983).

== World Cup individual podiums ==
| Season | Date | Venue | Position | Event |
|---|---|---|---|---|
| 1988 | 2 July 1988 | Minden | 1st | K1 |
| 1988 | 4 July 1988 | South Bend | 1st | K1 |
| 1988 | 7 August 1988 | Dublin | 2nd | K1 |
