= Yelena Kurzina =

Belarusian canoeist (born 1960)

Yelena Kurzina (born November 28, 1960 in Minsk) is a Belarusian slalom canoer who competed in the 1990s. She finished 25th in the K-1 event at the 1996 Summer Olympics in Atlanta.
