= Marcela Hilgertová =

Medal record

Women's canoe slalom

Representing Czechoslovakia

World Championships
| Bronze medal – third place | 1983 Meran | K-1 team |
| Bronze medal – third place | 1989 Savage River | K-1 team |

Marcela Hilgertová (née Košťálová, born 1962) is a former Czechoslovak slalom canoeist who competed from the early 1980s to the early 1990s. She won two bronze medals in the K-1 team event at the ICF Canoe Slalom World Championships, earning them in 1983 and 1989.

== Family ==
Her husband Ivan Hilgert is also a former slalom canoeist and medalist from world championships, their daughter is Czech canoeist Amálie Hilgertová.
