= Ueli Matti =

Swiss canoeist

Medal record

Men's canoe slalom

Representing Switzerland

European Championships
Gold medal – first place	1996 Augsburg	C2

Ueli Matti (born 10 February 1959) is a Swiss slalom canoeist who competed from the mid-1980s to the late 1990s. Competing in two Summer Olympics, he earned his best finish of fifth in the C2 event in Barcelona in 1992.

He is the European Champion in C2 from 1996.

His partner in the boat throughout the whole of his active career was his brother Peter Matti.

== World Cup individual podiums ==
Season	Date	Venue	Position	Event
1991	25 Aug 1991	Minden	3rd	C2
1991	1 Sep 1991	Wausau	3rd	C2
1992	7 Jun 1992	Merano	2nd	C2
1996	9 Jun 1996	La Seu d'Urgell	2nd	C2
1996	29 Sep 1996	Três Coroas	2nd	C2
