= Horst Pock =

Austrian slalom canoer (born 1967)

Horst Pock (born 6 February 1967 in Klagenfurt) is an Austrian slalom canoeist who competed from the late 1980s to the early 1990s. He finished 12th in the K-1 event at the 1992 Summer Olympics in Barcelona.

== See also ==
- 1988 Canoe Slalom World Cup
