= Canoeing at the 1996 Summer Olympics – Women's slalom K-1 =

Women's slalom K-1 at the Games of the XXVI Olympiad
- Venue: Ocoee Whitewater Center
- Dates: 27 July 1996
- Competitors: 30 from 18 nations

Medalists
1st place, gold medalist(s)		Štěpánka Hilgertová	Czech Republic
2nd place, silver medalist(s)		Dana Chladek	United States
3rd place, bronze medalist(s)		Myriam Fox-Jerusalmi	France

These are the results of the women's K-1 slalom competition in canoeing at the 1996 Summer Olympics. The K-1 (kayak single) event is raced by one-person kayaks through a whitewater course. The venue for the 1996 Olympic competition was at the Toccoa/Ocoee River along the Georgia-Tennessee state line.

== Medalists ==
Gold	Silver	Bronze
Štěpánka Hilgertová (CZE)	Dana Chladek (USA)	Myriam Fox-Jerusalmi (FRA)

== Results ==
The 30 competitors each took two runs through the whitewater slalom course on July 27. The best time of the two runs counted for the event.

The gold medal was decided in a tie-breaker.

Rank	Name	Run 1			Run 2			Result
Rank	Name	Time	Points	Total	Time	Points	Total	Total
Gold	Štěpánka Hilgertová (CZE)	164.49	5	169.49	166.97	5	171.97	169.49
Silver	Dana Chladek (USA)	181.80	205	431.80	164.49	5	169.49	169.49
Bronze	Myriam Fox-Jerusalmi (FRA)	170.22	5	175.22	166.00	5	171.00	171.00
4	Cristina Giai Pron (ITA)	171.86	155	326.85	166.84	5	171.84	171.84
5	Gabriela Brosková (SVK)	170.67	60	230.67	167.57	5	172.57	172.57
6	Anne Boixel (FRA)	162.79	10	172.79	162.88	105	267.88	172.79
7	Cathy Hearn (USA)	173.03	0	173.03	169.93	60	229.93	173.03
8	Margaret Langford (CAN)	178.49	15	193.49	168.59	5	173.59	173.59
9	Marcela Sadilová (CZE)	181.22	55	236.22	174.47	0	174.47	174.47
10	Elisabeth Micheler-Jones (GER)	171.56	5	176.56	156.73	305	461.73	176.56
11	Kordula Striepecke (GER)	171.63	155	326.63	176.98	0	176.98	176.98
12	Danielle Woodward (AUS)	181.05	105	286.05	177.60	0	177.60	177.60
13	Sandra Friedli (SUI)	172.70	5	177.70	221.01	10	231.01	177.70
14	Mia Farrance (AUS)	192.58	0	192.58	180.30	0	180.30	180.30
15	Barbara Nadalin (ITA)	201.04	105	306.04	171.14	10	181.14	181.14
16	Irena Pavelková (CZE)	184.45	55	239.45	166.89	15	181.89	181.89
17	Hiroko Kobayashi (JPN)	178.66	5	183.66	186.01	5	191.01	183.66
18	Rachel Crosbee (GBR)	165.24	25	190.24	168.24	25	193.24	190.24
19	Elena Kaliská (SVK)	174.85	55	229.85	170.45	20	190.45	190.45
20	María Eizmendi (ESP)	186.49	5	191.49	184.83	20	204.83	191.49
21	Bogusława Knapczyk (POL)	185.20	15	200.20	194.45	15	209.45	200.20
22	Florence Fernandes (POR)	192.19	20	212.19	203.20	5	208.20	208.20
23	Lynn Simpson (GBR)	177.07	160	337.07	161.71	50	211.71	211.71
24	Cristina Martínez (ESP)	204.09	20	224.09	215.91	65	280.91	224.09
25	Yelena Kurzina (BLR)	210.14	15	225.14	214.37	70	284.37	225.14
26	Nagwa El Desouki (SUI)	185.39	55	230.39	220.68	15	235.68	240.39
27	Sheryl Boyle (CAN)	227.89	15	242.89	194.41	50	244.41	242.89
28	Gilda Montenegro (CRC)	236.97	135	371.97	240.93	25	265.93	265.93
29	Ana Ugrinovska (MKD)	261.93	85	346.93	218.17	265	483.17	346.93
30	Dzintra Blūma (LAT)	-	-	Did not finish	267.81	105	372.81	372.81
