= Maylon Hanold =

American canoeist

Medal record

Women's canoe slalom

Representing United States

World Championships
Bronze medal – third place	1987 Bourg St.-Maurice	K-1 team

Maylon Turner Hanold (born September 13, 1963 in Charleston, South Carolina) is an American slalom canoeist who competed from the late 1980s to the early 1990s. She won a bronze medal in the K-1 team event at the 1987 ICF Canoe Slalom World Championships in Bourg-Saint-Maurice. She also finished 25th in the K-1 event at the 1992 Summer Olympics in Barcelona.

She graduated from the University of Washington (BA), Harvard University (EdM), and Seattle University (EdD).
