= 1987 ICF Canoe Slalom World Championships =

Canoe slalom event in Bourg St.-Maurice, France

The 1987 ICF Canoe Slalom World Championships were held in Bourg St.-Maurice, France under the auspices of International Canoe Federation for the second time. It was the 20th edition. Bourg St.-Maurice hosted the event previously in 1969.

== Medal summary ==
=== Men's ===
==== Canoe ====
Event	Gold	Points	Silver	Points	Bronze	Points
C1	Jon Lugbill (USA)	200.87	David Hearn (USA)	210.68	Bruce Lessels (USA)	211.33
C1 team	United States; Jon Lugbill; David Hearn; Bruce Lessels	242.02	France; Jean Sennelier; Thierry Humeau; Jacky Avril	248.89	Czechoslovakia; Juraj Ontko; Jozef Hajdučík; Jaroslav Slúčik	264.84
C2	France; Pierre Calori; Jacques Calori	218.61	United States; Lecky Haller; Jamie McEwan	222.24	Czechoslovakia; Milan Kučera; Miroslav Hajdučík	227.86
C2 team	France; Pierre Calori & Jacques Calori; Michel Saidi & Jérôme Daval; Gilles Lelievre & Jérôme Daille	260.18	Czechoslovakia; Jiří Rohan & Miroslav Šimek; Miroslav Hajdučík & Milan Kučera; Viktor Beneš & Ondřej Mohout	261.01	West Germany; Frank Hemmer & Thomas Loose; Günther Wolkenaer & Fredi Zimmermann; Stephan Bittner & Volker Nerlich	265.34

==== Kayak ====
Event	Gold	Points	Silver	Points	Bronze	Points
K1	Toni Prijon (FRG)	191.77	Jernej Abramič (YUG)	192.81	Marjan Štrukelj (YUG)	192.92
K1 team	United Kingdom; Richard Fox; Melvyn Jones; Russell Smith	214.33	Yugoslavia; Jernej Abramič; Marjan Štrukelj; Janez Skok	217.18	France; Christophe Prigent; Laurent Brissaud; Manuel Brissaud	218.86

=== Women's ===
==== Kayak ====
Event	Gold	Points	Silver	Points	Bronze	Points
K1	Elizabeth Sharman (GBR)	216.64	Myriam Jerusalmi (FRA)	218.92	Elisabeth Micheler (FRG)	222.22
K1 team	West Germany; Margit Messelhäuser; Ulla Steinle; Elisabeth Micheler	273.40	France; Myriam Jerusalmi; Marie-Françoise Grange-Prigent; Sylvie Arnaud	282.63	United States; Cathy Hearn; Dana Chladek; Maylon Hanold	286.95

== Medals table ==
Rank	Nation	Gold	Silver	Bronze	Total
1	France (FRA)	2	3	1	6
2	United States (USA)	2	2	2	6
3	West Germany (FRG)	2	0	2	4
4	Great Britain (GBR)	2	0	0	2
5	Yugoslavia (YUG)	0	2	1	3
6	Czechoslovakia (TCH)	0	1	2	3
Totals (6 entries)		8	8	8	24
