= Hiroko Kobayashi =

Japanese canoeist

Hiroko Kobayashi (小林 弘子, Kobayashi Hiroko; born February 14, 1970 in Tokyo) is a Japanese slalom canoer who competed in the early to mid-1990s. Competing in two Summer Olympics, she earned her best finish of 17th in the K-1 event in Atlanta in 1996.
