= Thierry Humeau =

French canoeist

Medal record

Men's canoe slalom

Representing France

World Championships
Silver medal – second place	1987 Bourg St.-Maurice	C1 team
Silver medal – second place	1989 Savage River	C1 team
Bronze medal – third place	1989 Savage River	C1

Thierry Humeau (born 8 November 1961 in Poitiers) is a former French slalom canoeist who competed from the mid-1980s to the early 1990s. He won three medals at the ICF Canoe Slalom World Championships with two silvers (C1 team: 1987, 1989) and a bronze (C1: 1989). Humeau also finished 8th in the C1 event at the 1992 Summer Olympics in Barcelona.

In the late 80s, he worked as a freelance photojournalist with Sigma Photo Agency in Paris. After the Olympics, Thierry moved to the US and migrated to TV & Film production. He has traveled around the globe reporting for major international television networks such as National Geographic TV, Vice, HBO, Aljazeera and the BBC. Experienced in difficult and challenging assignments, he has covered war zones, humanitarian, environmental and development issues. Thierry has also consulted with Sony and AVID Technology on the development and testing of large sensor cameras and file based editing workflows.

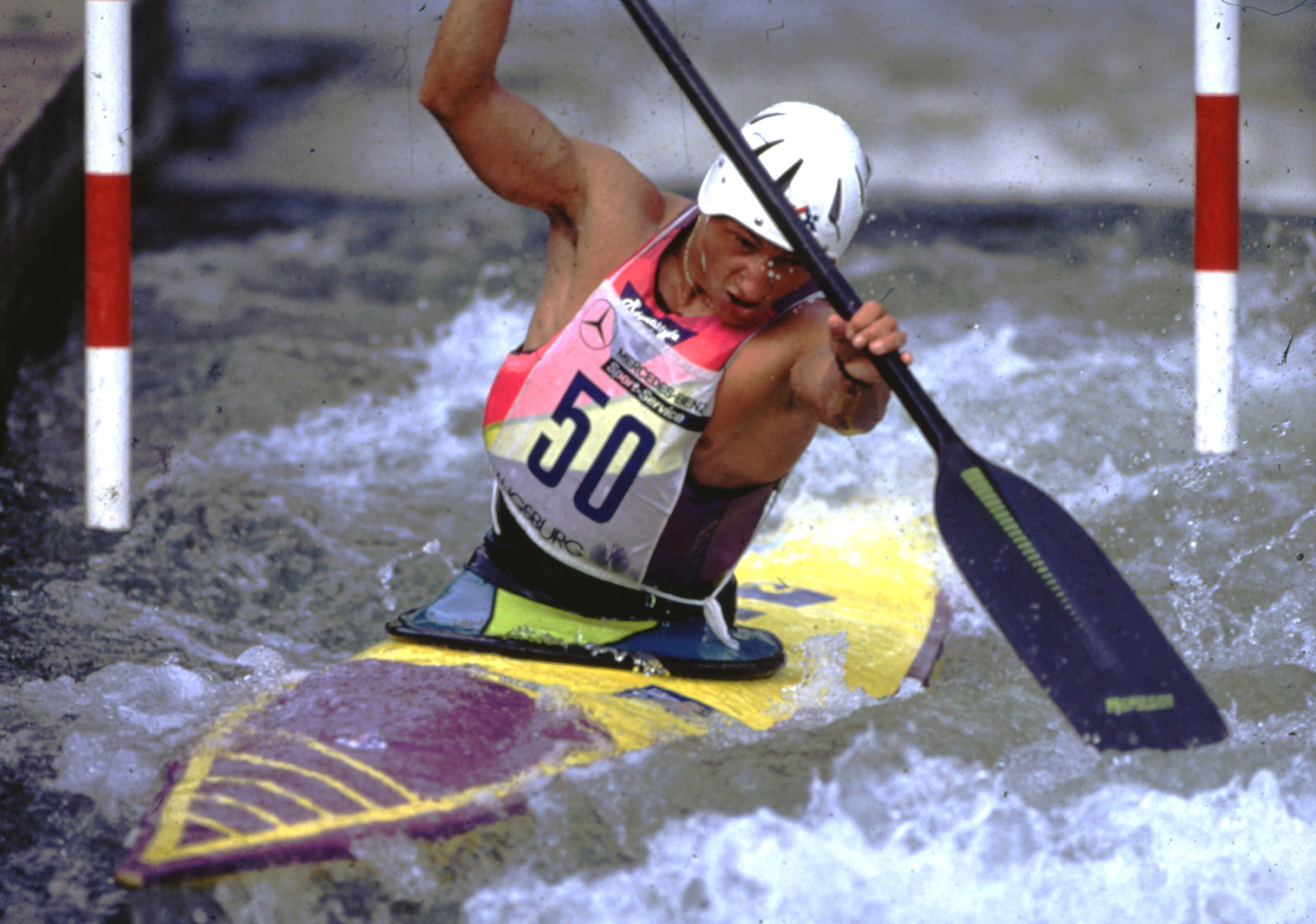
Humeau at the Canoe Slalom World Cup in Augsburg, 1990

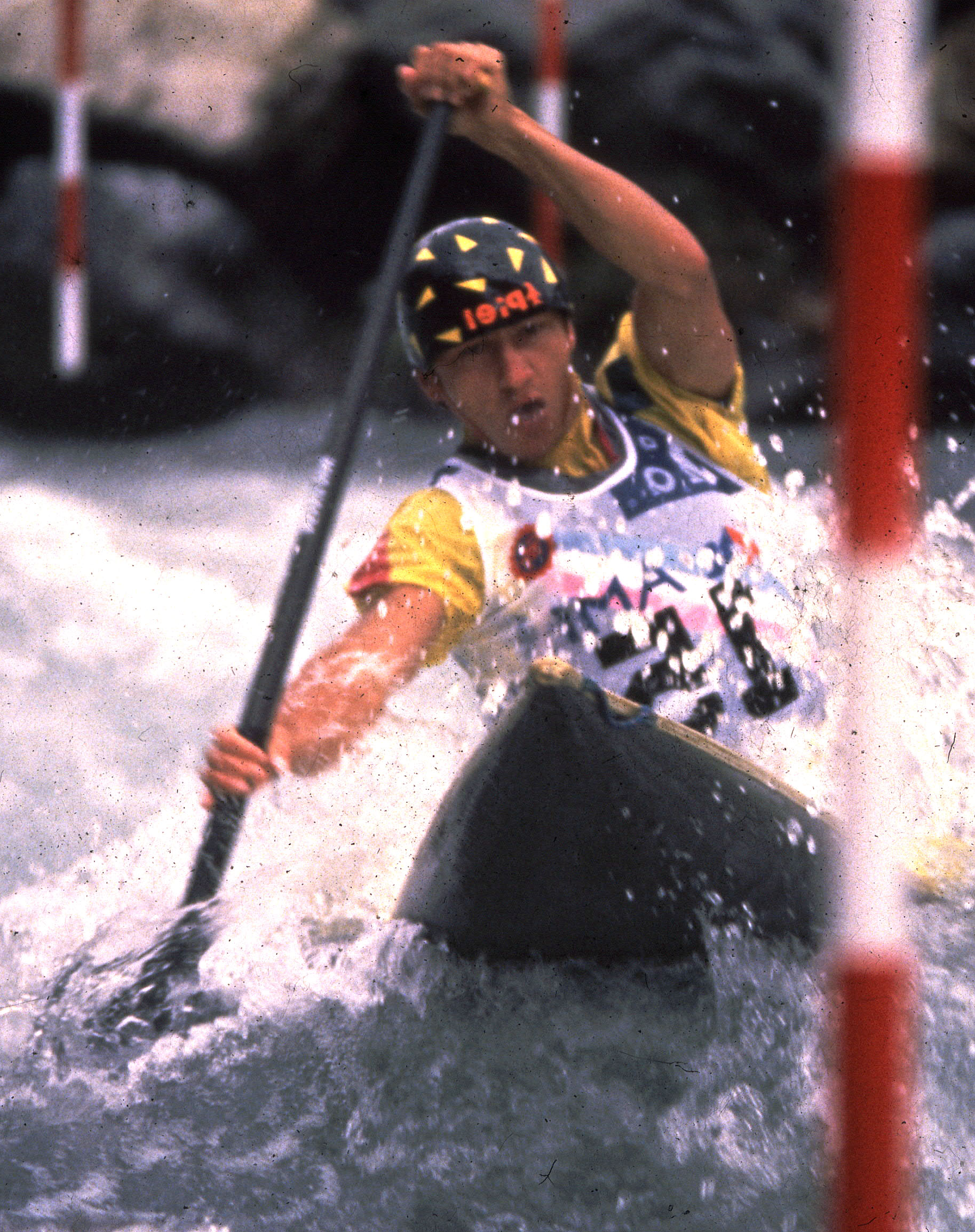

== World Cup individual podiums ==
Season	Date	Venue	Position	Event
1988			2nd	C1
1989	12 Aug 1989	Mezzana	3rd	C1
1989	15 Aug 1989	Augsburg	2nd	C1
