= Gabriela Zamišková =

Slovak slalom canoeist (born 1973)

Personal information
- Nationality: Slovak
- Born: Gabriela Brosková; 18 December 1973 (age 52) Liptovský Mikuláš, Czechoslovakia
- Height: 1.67 m (5 ft 6 in)
- Weight: 56 kg (123 lb)

Sport
- Country: Slovakia
- Sport: Canoe slalom
- Event: K1
Medal record
Women's canoe slalom
Representing Slovakia
European Championships
Gold medal – first place	2000 Mezzana	K1 team
Gold medal – first place	2005 Tacen	K1 team
Silver medal – second place	2002 Bratislava	K1 team

Gabriela Zamišková (née Brosková; born 18 December 1973, in Liptovský Mikuláš) is a Slovak slalom canoeist who competed at the international level from 1993 to 2005.

She won 3 medals at the European Championships (2 golds and 1 silver). She also finished fifth in the K1 event at the 1996 Summer Olympics in Atlanta.

== Career statistics ==
=== Major championships results timeline ===
Event		1993	1994	1995	1996	1997	1998	1999	2000	2001	2002	2003	2004	2005
Olympic Games	K1	Not held			5	Not held			—	Not held			—	Not held
World Championships	K1	23	Not held	27	Not held	11	Not held	22	Not held		23	6	Not held	10
World Championships	K1 team	7	Not held	8	Not held	5	Not held	4	Not held		4	6	Not held	DNF
European Championships	K1	Not held			7	Not held	34	Not held	14	Not held	9	Not held	—	11
European Championships	K1 team	Not held			7	Not held	4	Not held	1	Not held	2	Not held	—	1

=== World Cup individual podiums ===
Season	Date	Venue	Position	Event
1998	14 Jun 1998	Liptovský Mikuláš	3rd	K1
2003	13 Jul 2003	Tacen	1st	K1
