= Eva Roth =

German canoeist

Eva Roth (born 26 December 1967 in Augsburg) is a German slalom canoeist who competed in the late 1980s and the early 1990s. She finished fourth in the K1 event at the 1992 Summer Olympics in Barcelona.

== World Cup individual podiums ==
| Season | Date | Venuea | Position | Event |
|---|---|---|---|---|
| 1989 | 15 August 1989 | Augsburg | 3rd | K1 |
| 1990 | 25 August 1990 | Tacen | 3rd | K1 |
| 1991 | 7 July 1991 | Augsburg | 3rd | K1 |
