= Shaun Pearce =

British slalom canoeist (born 1969)

Medal record

Men's canoe slalom

Representing Great Britain

World Championships
Gold medal – first place	1991 Tacen	K1
Gold medal – first place	1993 Mezzana	K1 team
Gold medal – first place	1997 Três Coroas	K1 team
Bronze medal – third place	1995 Nottingham	K1 team

Shaun Pearce (born 13 December 1969 in Reading, Berkshire) is a British slalom canoeist who competed in the 1990s. He won four medals at the ICF Canoe Slalom World Championships with three golds (K1: 1991, K1 team: 1993, 1997) and a bronze (K1 team: 1995). He also won the World Cup series in K1 in 1994.

Pearce also finished 25th in the K1 event at the 1996 Summer Olympics in Atlanta.

== World Cup individual podiums ==
Season	Date	Venue	Position	Event
1990	1 Jul 1990	Wausau	1st	K1
1991	11 Jul 1991	Reals	3rd	K1
1993	25 Jul 1993	Lofer	3rd	K1
1994	26 Jun 1994	Nottingham	2nd	K1
1994	3 Jul 1994	Augsburg	2nd	K1
1994	18 Sep 1994	Asahi, Aichi	1st	K1
1997	29 Jun 1997	Björbo	2nd	K1
