= Albin Čižman =

Slovenian canoeist (born 1965)

Medal record

Men's canoe slalom

Representing Yugoslavia

World Championships
Gold medal – first place	1989 Savage River	K1 team

Albin Čižman (born 30 August 1965) is a Yugoslav-born, Slovenian slalom canoeist who competed from the mid-1980s to the mid-1990s. He won a gold medal in the K1 team event at the 1989 ICF Canoe Slalom World Championships in Savage River. He also finished ninth in the K1 event at the 1992 Summer Olympics in Barcelona.

Čižman was born in Ljubljana.

== World Cup individual podiums ==
Season	Date	Venue	Position	Event
1989	12 August 1989	Mezzana	1st	K1
1994	17 July 1994	La Seu d'Urgell	2nd	K1
