= Ivan Hilgert =

Medal record

Men's canoe slalom

Representing Czechoslovakia

World Championships
Bronze medal – third place	1983 Meran	K1 team

Ivan Hilgert is a former Czechoslovak slalom canoeist who competed from the mid-1980s to the early 1990s. He won a bronze medal in the K1 team event at the 1983 ICF Canoe Slalom World Championships in Meran.

His wife Marcela Hilgertová is also a former slalom canoeist and medalist from world championships.

== World Cup individual podiums ==
Season	Date	Venue	Position	Event
1988	4 July 1988	South Bend	3rd	K1
