= Bruce Lessels =

American canoeist

Medal record

Men's canoe slalom

Representing United States

World Championships
Gold medal – first place	1987 Bourg St.-Maurice	C-1 team
Bronze medal – third place	1987 Bourg St.-Maurice	C-1

Bruce Lessels is an American slalom canoeist who competed in the 1980s. He won two medals at the 1987 ICF Canoe Slalom World Championships in Bourg St.-Maurice with a gold in the C-1 team event and a bronze in the C-1 event.

Bruce is currently married with two daughters and owns an outdoor adventure company called Zoar Outdoor in Western Massachusetts.
