= Jozef Hajdučík =

Czechoslovak slalom canoeist

Medal record

Men's canoe slalom

Representing Czechoslovakia

World Championships
Silver medal – second place	1983 Meran	C1 team
Bronze medal – third place	1987 Bourg St.-Maurice	C1 team

Jozef Hajdučík is a former Czechoslovak slalom canoeist of Slovak nationality who competed in the 1980s, specializing in the C1 discipline.

Hajdučík participated in three World Championships, winning two medals in the C1 team event with a silver in 1983 and a bronze in 1987.

== Major championships results timeline ==
Event		1983	1984	1985	1986	1987
World Championships	C1	14	Not held	22	Not held	18
World Championships	C1 team	2	Not held	8	Not held	3
