= Janez Skok =

Medal record

Men's canoe slalom

Representing Yugoslavia

World Championships
Silver medal – second place	1987 Bourg St.-Maurice	K1 team
Bronze medal – third place	1985 Augsburg	K1 team

Janez Skok (born June 18, 1963 in Ljubljana) is a Yugoslav-born, Slovenian slalom canoeist who competed from the early 1980s to the mid-1990s. He won two medals in K1 team event at the ICF Canoe Slalom World Championships with a silver in 1987 and a bronze in 1985. He also finished tenth in the K1 event at the 1992 Summer Olympics in Barcelona.

== World Cup individual podiums ==
Season	Date	Venue	Position	Event
1988	4 July 1988	South Bend	1st	K1
1988	7 August 1988	Dublin	1st	K1
1988	21 August 1988	Augsburg	2nd	K1
1990	1 Jul 1990	Wausau	2nd	K1
