= Andreas Kübler =

Medal record

Men's canoe slalom

Representing West Germany

World Championships
Silver medal – second place	1985 Augsburg	C1 team

Andreas Kübler (born 1963) is a former West German-German slalom canoeist who competed from the mid-1980s to the early 1990s. He won a silver medal in the C1 team event at the 1985 ICF Canoe Slalom World Championships in Augsburg.

== World Cup individual podiums ==
Season	Date	Venue	Position	Event
1991	10 Jul 1991	Reals	3rd	C1
1992	16 Feb 1992	Murupara	1st	C1
