= Jože Vidmar =

Medal record

Men's canoe slalom

Representing Yugoslavia

World Championships
Bronze medal – third place	1983 Meran	C1
Bronze medal – third place	1989 Savage River	C1 team

Representing Slovenia

World Championships
Gold medal – first place	1993 Mezzana	C1 team

Jože Vidmar (born 27 February 1963 in Ljubljana) is a Yugoslav-born Slovenian slalom canoeist who competed from the early 1980s to the mid-1990s. He won three medals at the ICF Canoe Slalom World Championships with a gold (C1 team: 1993) and two bronzes (C1: 1983, C1 team: 1989).

Vidmar also finished 14th in the C1 event at the 1992 Summer Olympics in Barcelona.

== World Cup individual podiums ==
Season	Date	Venue	Position	Event
1989	15 Aug 1989	Augsburg	3rd	C1
