= Christophe Prigent =

Medal record

Men's canoe slalom

Representing France

World Championships
Silver medal – second place	1985 Augsburg	K-1 team
Bronze medal – third place	1987 Bourg St.-Maurice	K-1 team

Christophe Prigent (born 1956) is a former French slalom canoeist who competed from the late 1970s to the late 1980s. He won two medals in the K-1 team event at the ICF Canoe Slalom World Championships with a silver in 1985 and a bronze in 1987.
