= Russell Smith (canoeist) =

British slalom canoeist

Medal record

Men's canoe slalom

Representing Great Britain

World Championships
Gold medal – first place	1987 Bourg St.-Maurice	K-1 team

Russell Smith is a former British slalom canoeist who competed from the mid-1980s to the early 1990s.

He won a gold medal in the K-1 team event at the 1987 ICF Canoe Slalom World Championships in Bourg St.-Maurice.
