= Margit Messelhäuser =

Medal record

Women's canoe slalom

Representing West Germany

World Championships
Gold medal – first place	1985 Augsburg	K-1
Gold medal – first place	1987 Bourg St.-Maurice	K-1 team
Silver medal – second place	1985 Augsburg	K-1 team

Margit Messelhäuser is a West German slalom canoeist who competed from the mid-1980s to the early 1990s.

She won three medals at the ICF Canoe Slalom World Championships with two golds (K-1: 1985; K-1 team: 1987) and a silver (K-1 team: 1985).
