= Volker Nerlich =

Medal record

Men's canoe slalom

Representing West Germany

World Championships
Bronze medal – third place	1987 Bourg St.-Maurice	C-2 team
Bronze medal – third place	1989 Savage River	C-2 team

Representing Germany

World Championships
Bronze medal – third place	1991 Tacen	C-2 team

Volker Nerlich is a former West German-German slalom canoeist who competed in the 1980s and 1990s. He won three bronze medals in the C-2 team event at the ICF Canoe Slalom World Championships. Two of them for West Germany (1987, 1989) and the last one for Germany in 1991.
