= Jernej Abramič =

Yugoslav-born, Slovenian slalom canoer (born 1964)

Medal record

Men's canoe slalom

Representing Yugoslavia

World Championships
Gold medal – first place	1989 Savage River	K-1 team
Silver medal – second place	1987 Bourg St.-Maurice	K-1
Silver medal – second place	1987 Bourg St.-Maurice	K-1 team
Bronze medal – third place	1985 Augsburg	K-1 team
Bronze medal – third place	1989 Savage River	K-1

Jernej Abramič (born December 17, 1964, in Nova Gorica) is a Yugoslav-born Slovenian slalom canoer who competed from the early 1980s to the late 1990s. He won five medals for Yugoslavia at the ICF Canoe Slalom World Championships with a gold (K-1 team: 1989), two silvers (K-1: 1987, K-1 team: 1987) and two bronzes (K-1: 1989, K-1 team: 1985).

Abramič also finished seventh for Slovenia in the K-1 event at the 1996 Summer Olympics in Atlanta.
