= Joanne Woods =

Canadian canoeist (born 1959)

Joanne Woods (born November 7, 1959, in Edmonton) is a Canadian slalom canoer who competed from the mid-1980s to the mid-1990s. She finished eighth in the K-1 event at the 1992 Summer Olympics in Barcelona.
