= Michael Seibert (canoeist) =

Medal record

Men's canoe slalom

Representing West Germany

World Championships
Bronze medal – third place	1989 Savage River	K1 team

Representing Germany

World Championships
Silver medal – second place	1991 Tacen	K1 team

Michael Seibert is a West German-German slalom canoeist who competed from the mid-1980s to the early 1990s. He won two medals in the K1 team event at the ICF Canoe Slalom World Championships with a silver in 1991 and a bronze in 1989.

== World Cup individual podiums ==
Season	Date	Venue	Position	Event
1989	15 Aug 1989	Augsburg	1st	K1
1992	16 Feb 1992	Murupara	2nd	K1
