= Juraj Ontko =

Czechoslovak-Slovak slalom canoeist

Personal information
- Nationality: Slovak
- Born: 23 December 1964 (age 61) Liptovský Mikuláš, Czechoslovakia
- Years active: 1981-1998
- Height: 1.66 m (5 ft 5 in)
- Weight: 63 kg (139 lb)

Sport
- Country: Slovakia
- Sport: Canoe slalom
- Event: C1, C2
Medal record
Men's canoe slalom
Representing Czechoslovakia
World Championships
Silver medal – second place	1983 Meran	C1 team
Bronze medal – third place	1987 Bourg St.-Maurice	C1 team
Representing Slovakia
World Championships
Gold medal – first place	1997 Três Coroas	C1 team
Bronze medal – third place	1993 Mezzana	C2 team
Bronze medal – third place	1995 Nottingham	C1 team
European Championships
Gold medal – first place	1998 Roudnice nad Labem	C1 team

Juraj Ontko (born 23 December 1964 in Liptovský Mikuláš) is a Czechoslovak-Slovak slalom canoeist who competed at the international level from 1981 to 1998, specializing primarily in the C1 discipline. He also competed in C2 in 1993, when he was partnered by Ladislav Čáni.

He won five medals at the ICF Canoe Slalom World Championships. A silver and a bronze for Czechoslovakia in the C1 team event (1983, 1987) and a gold (C1 team: 1997) and two bronzes for Slovakia (C1 team: 1995, C2 team: 1993). He also won a gold medal in the C1 team event at the 1998 European Championships.

Ontko competed for Czechoslovakia at the 1992 Summer Olympics in Barcelona, finishing eighth in the C1 event.

== Career statistics ==
=== Major championships results timeline ===
==== Representing Czechoslovakia ====
Event		1981	1982	1983	1984	1985	1986	1987	1988	1989	1990	1991	1992
Olympic Games	C1	Not held											8
World Championships	C1	15	Not held	6	Not held	5	Not held	10	Not held	8	Not held	13	Not held
World Championships	C1 team	5	Not held	2	Not held	8	Not held	3	Not held	—	Not held	5	Not held

==== Representing Slovakia ====
Event		1993	1994	1995	1996	1997	1998
World Championships	C1	—	Not held	38	Not held	11	Not held
World Championships	C2	18	Not held	—	Not held	—	Not held
World Championships	C1 team	—	Not held	3	Not held	1	Not held
World Championships	C2 team	3	Not held	—	Not held	—	Not held
European Championships	C1	Not held			—	Not held	34
European Championships	C1 team	Not held			—	Not held	1

=== World Cup individual podiums ===
Season	Date	Venue	Position	Event
1992	23 Feb 1992	Launceston	3rd	C1
1992	7 Jun 1992	Merano	2nd	C1
