= Marjan Štrukelj =

Slovenian canoeist (born 1964)

Medal record

Men's canoe slalom

Representing Yugoslavia

World Championships
Gold medal – first place	1989 Savage River	K1 team
Silver medal – second place	1987 Bourg St.-Maurice	K1 team
Silver medal – second place	1991 Tacen	K1
Bronze medal – third place	1985 Augsburg	K1 team
Bronze medal – third place	1987 Bourg St.-Maurice	K1

Representing Slovenia

World Championships
Silver medal – second place	1995 Nottingham	K1 team

Marjan Štrukelj (born 24 September 1964 in Nova Gorica) is a Yugoslav-born, Slovenian slalom canoeist who competed from the mid-1980s to the mid-1990s. He won six medals at the ICF Canoe Slalom World Championships with a gold (K1 team: 1989 for Yugoslavia), three silvers (K1: 1991 for Yugoslavia, K1 team: 1987 for Yugoslavia, 1995 for Slovenia) and two bronzes (K1: 1987 for Yugoslavia, K1 team: 1985 for Yugoslavia).

Štrukelj also finished sixth for Slovenia in the K1 event at the 1992 Summer Olympics in Barcelona.

== World Cup individual podiums ==
Season	Date	Venue	Position	Event
1992	7 June 1992	Merano	3rd	K1
