= Miroslav Hajdučík =

Czechoslovak slalom canoeist

Personal information
- Nationality: Slovak
- Born: 1962 (age 63–64)
- Years active: 1982-1989

Sport
- Country: Czechoslovakia
- Sport: Canoe slalom
- Event: C2
Medal record
Men's slalom canoeing
Representing Czechoslovakia
World Championships
Gold medal – first place	1983 Meran	C2 team
Gold medal – first place	1985 Augsburg	C2 team
Silver medal – second place	1987 Bourg St.-Maurice	C2 team
Silver medal – second place	1989 Savage River	C2 team
Bronze medal – third place	1987 Bourg St.-Maurice	C2

Miroslav Hajdučík (born 1962) is a Czechoslovak slalom canoeist who competed at the international level from 1982 to 1989.

He won a bronze medal in the C2 event at the 1987 ICF Canoe Slalom World Championships in Bourg St.-Maurice. He also won two golds (1983, 1985) and two silvers (1987, 1989) at the World Championships in the C2 team event.

His partner in the C2 boat throughout his career was Milan Kučera.

== Major championships results timeline ==
Event		1983	1984	1985	1986	1987	1988	1989
World Championships	C2	4	Not held	12	Not held	3	Not held	11
World Championships	C2 team	1	Not held	1	Not held	2	Not held	2
