= Milan Kučera (canoeist) =

Slovak slalom canoeist (born 1963)

Personal information
- Nationality: Slovak
- Born: 1963 (age 62–63)
- Years active: 1982–1993

Sport
- Country: Slovakia
- Sport: Canoe slalom
- Event: C2
Medal record
Men's canoe slalom
World Championships
Representing Czechoslovakia
Gold medal – first place	1983 Meran	C2 team
Gold medal – first place	1985 Augsburg	C2 team
Silver medal – second place	1987 Bourg St.-Maurice	C2 team
Silver medal – second place	1989 Savage River	C2 team
Silver medal – second place	1991 Tacen	C2 team
Bronze medal – third place	1987 Bourg St.-Maurice	C2
Representing Slovakia
Bronze medal – third place	1993 Mezzana	C2 team

Milan Kučera (born 1963) is a Slovak slalom canoeist who competed at the international level from 1982 to 1993, specializing in the C2 discipline.

He won seven medals at the ICF Canoe Slalom World Championships with two golds (C2 team: 1983, 1985 both for Czechoslovakia), three silvers (C2 team: 1987, 1989, 1991 all for Czechoslovakia) and two bronzes (C2: 1987 for Czechoslovakia; C2 team: 1993 for Slovakia).

His partner in the C2 boat from 1982 to 1989 was Miroslav Hajdučík. From 1991 to 1993 he paddled with Viktor Beneš.

== Career statistics ==
=== Major championships results timeline ===
Representing Czechoslovakia from 1983 to 1992 and Slovakia in 1993.

Event		1983	1984	1985	1986	1987	1988	1989	1990	1991	1992	1993
World Championships	C2	4	Not held	12	Not held	3	Not held	11	Not held	10	Not held	17
World Championships	C2 team	1	Not held	1	Not held	2	Not held	2	Not held	2	Not held	3

=== World Cup individual podiums ===
Season	Date	Venue	Position	Event
1991	6 Jul 1991	Augsburg	3rd	C2
1992	20 Jun 1992	Bourg St.-Maurice	1st	C2
