= Elisabeth Micheler-Jones =

Canoe racer

Medal record

Women's canoe slalom

Representing West Germany

World Championships
Gold medal – first place	1987 Bourg St.-Maurice	K1 team
Bronze medal – third place	1987 Bourg St.-Maurice	K1

Representing Germany

Olympic Games
Gold medal – first place	1992 Barcelona	K1

World Championships
Gold medal – first place	1991 Tacen	K1
Bronze medal – third place	1995 Nottingham	K1 team

European Championships
Silver medal – second place	1996 Augsburg	K1 team

Elisabeth Micheler-Jones (born 30 April 1966 in Augsburg) is a West German-German slalom canoeist who competed from the mid-1980s to the mid-1990s. Competing in two Summer Olympics, she won a gold medal in the K1 event in Barcelona in 1992.

Micheler-Jones also won four medals at the ICF Canoe Slalom World Championships with two golds (K1: 1991 for Germany, K1 team: 1987 for West Germany) and two bronzes (K1: 1987 for West Germany, K1 team: 1995 for Germany). She also has a silver from K1 team event at the 1996 European Championships in Augsburg.

Her husband, Melvyn Jones of Great Britain, finished seventh in the K1 event at the 1992 Summer Olympics.

== World Cup individual podiums ==
	1st place, gold medalist(s)	2nd place, silver medalist(s)	3rd place, bronze medalist(s)	Total
K1	4	3	3	10

Season	Date	Venue	Position	Event
1990	12 August 1990	Augsburg	1st	K1
1990	25 August 1990	Tacen	2nd	K1
1991	7 July 1991	Augsburg	1st	K1
1992	23 February 1992	Launceston	1st	K1
1993	1 August 1993	Augsburg	3rd	K1
1993	31 August 1993	Ocoee	3rd	K1
1995	25 June 1995	Prague	2nd	K1
1995	2 July 1995	Tacen	3rd	K1
1996	21 April 1996	Ocoee	2nd	K1
1996	16 June 1996	Augsburg	1st	K1
