= Minden Wild Water Preserve =

Canoeing and kayaking slalom facility in Minden, Ontario

- Interactive map of Minden Wild Water Preserve
- Location: Minden, Ontario, Canada
- Coordinates: 44°58′02.8″N 78°40′55.2″W
- Capacity: 500

Construction
- Renovated: 2012-2014

Tenant
- 2015 Pan American Games

The Minden Wild Water Preserve is a current natural canoeing and kayaking slalom facility in Minden, Ontario, Canada, and was used for the 2015 Pan American Games canoe slalom events. The facility's renovations were completed in 2014, one year before the 2015 Pan American Games began. The venue was the furthest games venue from Toronto at about 191 km away.

The renovations to the facility cost about $2 million.

== Events hosted ==
- Andrew Westlake Memorial
- 1991 Canoe Slalom World Cup
- 1993 Canoe Slalom World Cup
- 1997 Canoe Slalom World Cup
- 2015 Pan American Games

== See also ==
- Venues of the 2015 Pan American and Parapan American Games
