= Savage River (Maryland) =

River in the U.S. state of Maryland

Coordinates: 39.5015°N 79.1112°W

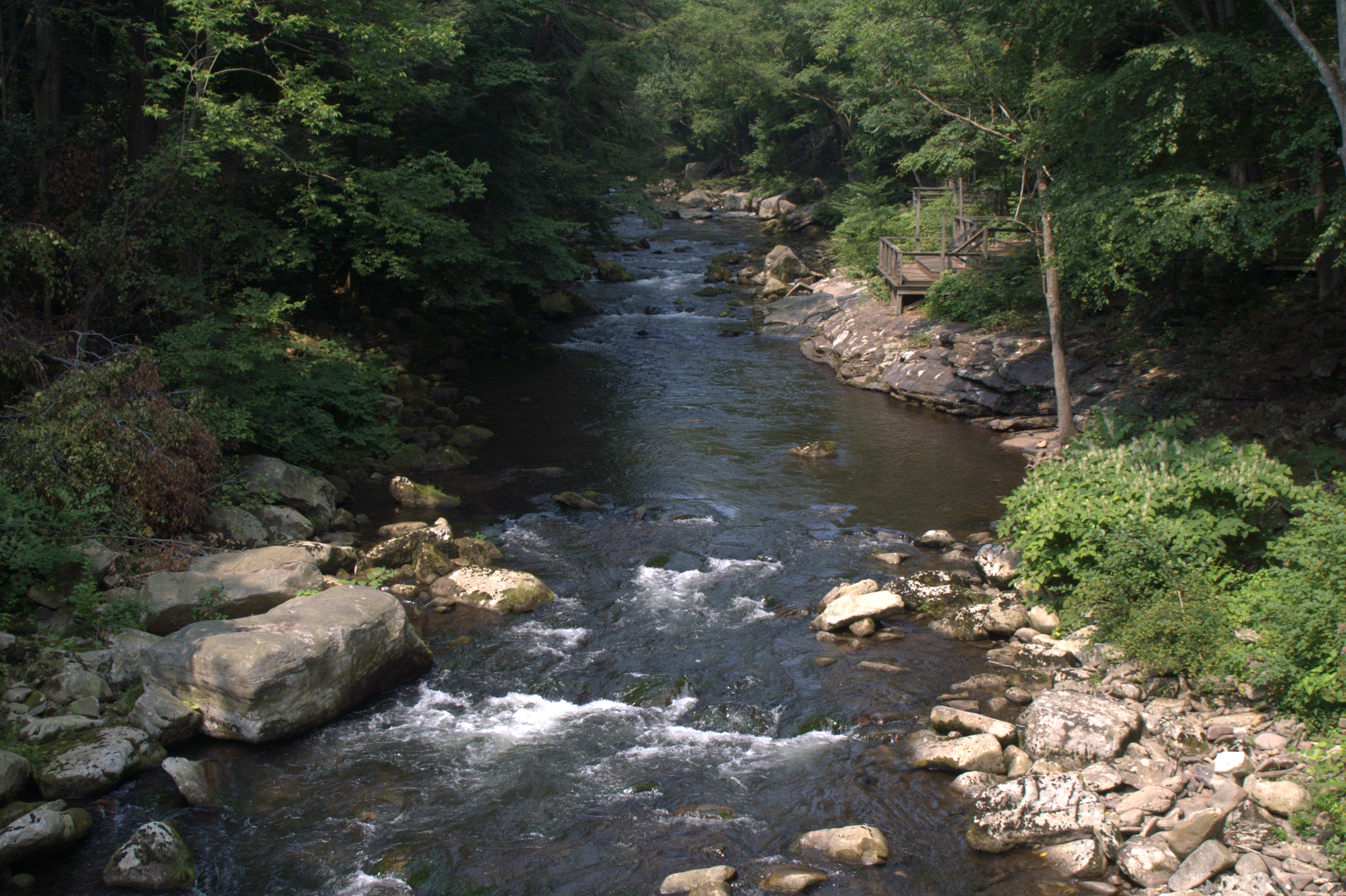
Savage River, groundwater flow

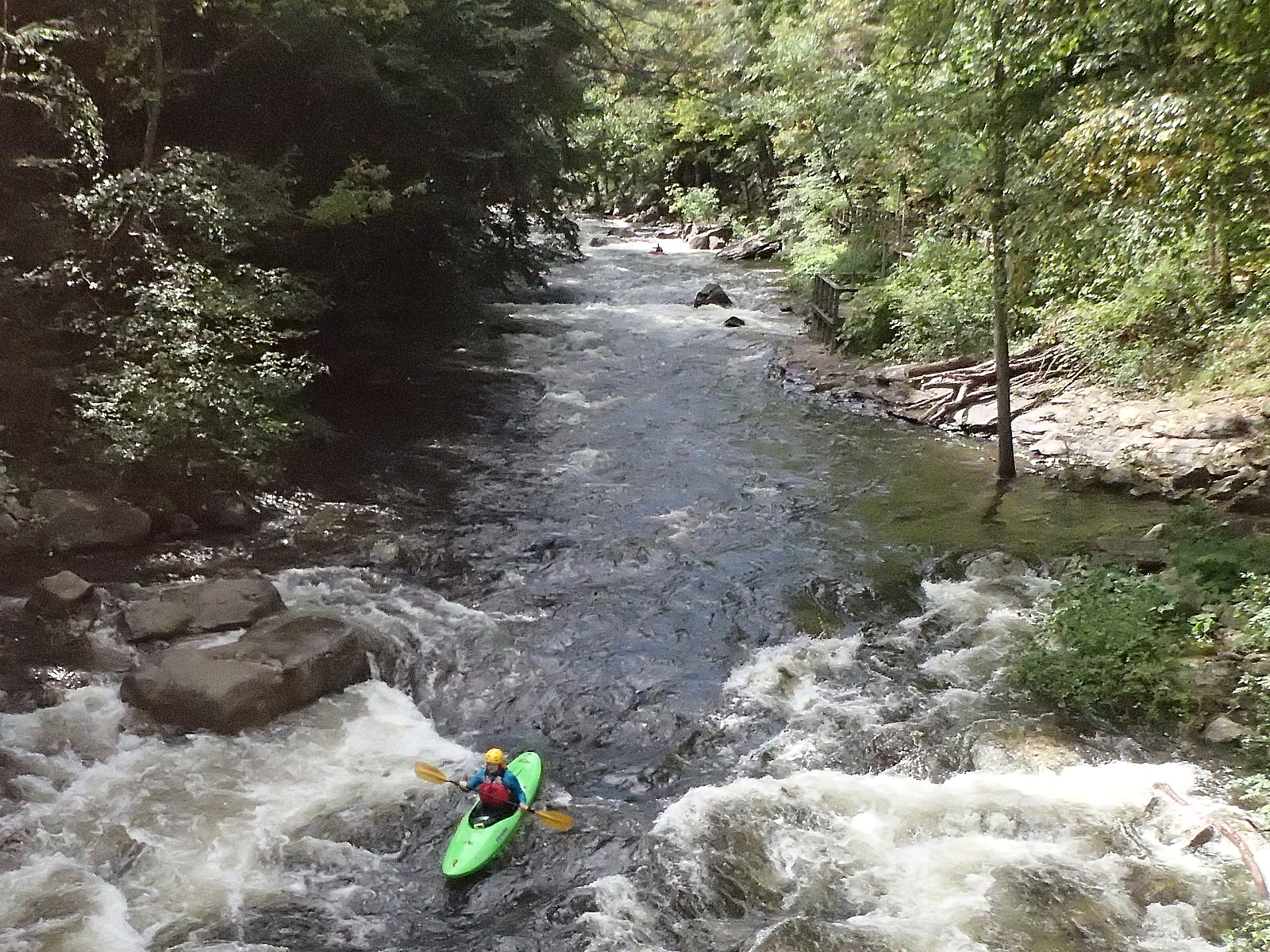
Savage River, 1000 cfs dam release

The Savage River is a 29.5-mile-long (47.5 km) river in Garrett County, Maryland, and is the first major tributary of the North Branch Potomac River from its source. The river was named for 18th-century surveyor John Savage.

Tributaries of the Savage River upstream of the Savage River Reservoir include Carey Run, Mudlick Run, Little Savage River, Bluelick Run, Blacklick Run, Warnick Run, Poplar Lick Run, and Bear Pen Run. At the southern end of the reservoir, the U.S. Army Corps of Engineers maintains the Savage River Dam for flood control and recreation. It has trout fishing for brown, rainbow, brook and sometimes cutthroat trout. Pine Swamp Run, Dry Run, Middle Fork Crabtree Creek, and Crabtree Creek flow into the reservoir. Aaron Run joins the Savage River just upstream of its merger with the North Branch Potomac River.

The last 4.5 miles (7.2 km) of the river, from the Savage River Dam to its confluence with the Potomac at Bloomington, Maryland, is a destination for whitewater paddling and slalom racing, on the infrequent occasion when sufficient water is released from the dam. There were three one-day recreational releases in 2011, two in June and one in September.

The Savage has been used for the U.S. Olympic Trials and was the site of the 1989 ICF Canoe Slalom World Championships on June 24–25. The usual put-in for whitewater boats is 0.7 miles (1.1 km) below the dam, where the highway crosses the river. The slalom racing section begins 0.5 miles (800 m) further downstream, below the 5.0-foot-high (1.5 m) Piedmont Dam, and ends 0.35 miles (560 m) downstream at the viewing stand above the pedestrian suspension bridge.

The 1989 race was the first time the Slalom World Championships were held in the United States. The next occasion was a quarter-century later in 2014 when they were held on artificial whitewater at the nearby Adventure Sports Center International, constructed in 2007 as a more accessible alternative to the seldom-watered Savage.

The average gradient for the Savage River's whitewater section is 75 feet/mile (1.4%), with sections at 100 feet/mile (1.9%), giving the rapids a whitewater class III to III+ at the typical recreational release of 800 cu ft/s (23 m^{3}/s). The rapids are fast and continuous, with very few eddies or calm spots.
