= List of ICF Canoe Slalom World Championships medalists in women's kayak =

This is a list of medalists from the ICF Canoe Slalom World Championships in women's kayak.

== K1 ==
Debuted: 1949. The event was folding from 1949 to 1963

Championships	Gold	Silver	Bronze
1949 Geneva	Heidi Pillwein (AUT)	Fritzi Schwingl (AUT)	Gerti Pertlwieser (AUT)
1951 Steyr	Gerti Pertlwieser (AUT)	Fritzi Schwingl (AUT)	Anni Reifinger (FRG)
1953 Meran	Fritzi Schwingl (AUT)	Eva Setzkorn (GDR)	Dana Martanová (TCH)
1955 Tacen	Rosemarie Biesinger (FRG)	Karin Tietze (GDR)	Eva Setzkorn (GDR)
1957 Augsburg	Brigitte Magnus (GDR)	Eva Setzkorn (GDR)	Anneliese Seidel (GDR)
1959 Geneva	Hilde Urbaniak (FRG)	Anneliese Bauer (GDR)	Inge Walthemate (FRG)
1961 Hainsberg	Ludmila Veberová (TCH)	Anneliese Bauer (GDR)	Ute Strompel (GDR)
1963 Spittal	Ludmila Veberová (TCH)	Ursula Gläser (GDR)	Jana Zvěřinová (TCH)
1965 Spittal	Ursula Gläser (GDR)	Lia Merkel (GDR)	Bärbel Körner (FRG)
1967 Lipno	Ludmila Polesná (TCH)	Lia Merkel (GDR)	Bärbel Richter (GDR)
1969 Bourg St.-Maurice	Ludmila Polesná (TCH)	Ulrike Deppe (FRG)	Jana Zvěřinová (TCH)
1971 Meran	Angelika Bahmann (GDR)	Ludmila Polesná (TCH)	Veronika Stampe (GDR)
1973 Muotathal	Sybille Spindler (GDR)	Maria Ćwiertniewicz (POL)	Martina Falke (GDR)
1975 Skopje	Maria Ćwiertniewicz (POL)	Ulrike Deppe (FRG)	Angelika Bahmann (GDR)
1977 Spittal	Angelika Bahmann (GDR)	Petra Krol (GDR)	Linda Harrison (USA)
1979 Jonquière	Cathy Hearn (USA)	Elizabeth Sharman (GBR)	Linda Harrison (USA)
1981 Bala	Ulrike Deppe (FRG)	Cathy Hearn (USA)	Jocelyne Roupioz (FRA)
1983 Meran	Elizabeth Sharman (GBR)	Jane Roderick (GBR)	Marie-Françoise Grange (FRA)
1985 Augsburg	Margit Messelhäuser (FRG)	Marie-Françoise Grange (FRA)	Gail Allan (GBR)
1987 Bourg St.-Maurice	Elizabeth Sharman (GBR)	Myriam Jerusalmi (FRA)	Elisabeth Micheler (FRG)
1989 Savage River	Myriam Jerusalmi (FRA)	Dana Chladek (USA)	Cathy Hearn (USA)
1991 Tacen	Elisabeth Micheler (GER)	Dana Chladek (USA)	Kordula Striepecke (GER)
1993 Mezzana	Myriam Jerusalmi (FRA)	Anne Boixel (FRA)	Marianne Agulhon (FRA)
1995 Nottingham	Lynn Simpson (GBR)	Anne Boixel (FRA)	Kordula Striepecke (GER)
1997 Três Coroas	Brigitte Guibal (FRA)	Štěpánka Hilgertová (CZE)	Cathy Hearn (USA)
1999 La Seu d'Urgell	Štěpánka Hilgertová (CZE)	Beata Grzesik (POL)	Sandra Friedli (SUI)
2002 Bourg St.-Maurice	Rebecca Giddens (USA)	Mandy Planert (GER)	Cristina Giai Pron (ITA)
2003 Augsburg	Štěpánka Hilgertová (CZE)	Jennifer Bongardt (GER)	Rebecca Giddens (USA)
2005 Penrith	Elena Kaliská (SVK)	Mandy Planert (GER)	Peggy Dickens (FRA)
2006 Prague	Jana Dukátová (SVK)	Fiona Pennie (GBR)	Jennifer Bongardt (GER)
2007 Foz do Iguaçu	Jennifer Bongardt (GER)	Elena Kaliská (SVK)	Štěpánka Hilgertová (CZE)
2009 La Seu d'Urgell	Jasmin Schornberg (GER)	Maialen Chourraut (ESP)	Lizzie Neave (GBR)
2010 Tacen	Corinna Kuhnle (AUT)	Jana Dukátová (SVK)	Violetta Oblinger-Peters (AUT)
2011 Bratislava	Corinna Kuhnle (AUT)	Jana Dukátová (SVK)	Maialen Chourraut (ESP)
2013 Prague	Émilie Fer (FRA)	Nouria Newman (FRA)	Jasmin Schornberg (GER)
2014 Deep Creek Lake	Jessica Fox (AUS)	Fiona Pennie (GBR)	Melanie Pfeifer (GER)
2015 London	Kateřina Kudějová (CZE)	Ricarda Funk (GER)	Melanie Pfeifer (GER)
2017 Pau	Jessica Fox (AUS)	Jana Dukátová (SVK)	Ricarda Funk (GER)
2018 Rio de Janeiro	Jessica Fox (AUS)	Mallory Franklin (GBR)	Ricarda Funk (GER)
2019 La Seu d'Urgell	Eva Terčelj (SLO)	Jessica Fox (AUS)	Luuka Jones (NZL)
2021 Bratislava	Ricarda Funk (GER)	Elena Apel (GER)	Kimberley Woods (GBR)
2022 Augsburg	Ricarda Funk (GER)	Jessica Fox (AUS)	Elena Lilik (GER)
2023 London	Jessica Fox (AUS)	Eliška Mintálová (SVK)	Klaudia Zwolińska (POL)
2025 Penrith	Klaudia Zwolińska (POL)	Kimberley Woods (GBR)	Kate Eckhardt (AUS)
2026 Oklahoma City	Jessica Fox (AUS)	Evy Leibfarth (USA)	Kimberley Woods (GBR)

- Medal table

Rank	Nation	Gold	Silver	Bronze	Total
1	East Germany	5	9	7	21
2	Germany (GER)	5	5	9	19
3	Austria (AUT)	5	2	2	9
4	Australia (AUS)	5	2	1	8
5	France (FRA)	4	5	4	13
6	West Germany	4	2	4	10
7	Czechoslovakia	4	1	3	8
8	Great Britain (GBR)	3	6	4	13
9	Czech Republic (CZE)	3	1	1	5
10	Slovakia (SVK)	2	5	0	7
11	United States (USA)	2	4	5	11
12	Poland (POL)	2	2	1	5
13	Slovenia (SLO)	1	0	0	1
14	Spain (ESP)	0	1	1	2
15	Italy (ITA)	0	0	1	1
15	New Zealand (NZL)	0	0	1	1
15	Switzerland (SUI)	0	0	1	1
Totals (17 entries)		45	45	45	135

== K1 team ==
Debuted: 1949. Not held: 1961. Resumed: 1963. The event was folding from 1949 to 1963.

Championships	Gold	Silver	Bronze
1949 Geneva	Austria; Heidi Pillwein; Fritzi Schwingl; Gerti Pertlwieser	Switzerland; Marie Fromaigeat; Elsa Oderholz; Janine Maulet	–
1951 Steyr	Austria; Gerti Pertlwieser; Fritzi Schwingl; Heidi Pillwein	West Germany; Anni Reifinger; Liesl Fischer; Anni Anwander	Switzerland; Eva Speck; Elsa Oderholz; Madeleine Zimmermann
1953 Meran	Czechoslovakia; Jaroslava Havlová; Dana Martanová; Květa Havlová	East Germany; Anneliese Borwitz; Eveline Pawliczek; Eva Setzkorn	Austria; Ulrike Werner; Gertrude Will; Fritzi Schwingl
1955 Tacen	East Germany; Eva Setzkorn; Elfriede Hugo; Karin Tietze	West Germany; Rosemarie Biesinger; Anni Reifinger; Hanni Schulte	Czechoslovakia; Jaroslava Havlová; Květa Havlová; Renata Knýová
1957 Augsburg	East Germany; Elfriede Hugo; Eva Setzkorn; Brigitte Magnus	West Germany; Inge Walthemate; Rosemarie Biesinger; Hanni Schulte	Austria; Hella Philips; Gertrude Stöllner; Fritzi Schwingl
1959 Geneva	East Germany; Ursula Gläser; Eva Setzkorn; Elfriede Hugo	–	–
1963 Spittal	East Germany; Anneliese Bauer; Ursula Gläser; Lia Merkel	Czechoslovakia; Jana Zvěřinová; Renata Knýová; Ludmila Veberová	–
1965 Spittal	East Germany; Ursula Gläser; Bärbel Richter; Lia Merkel	Czechoslovakia; Bohumila Kapplová; Renata Knýová; Ludmila Polesná	West Germany; Heide Boikat; Bärbel Körner; Kirsten Schmidt
1967 Lipno	East Germany; Bärbel Richter; Dagmar Sickert; Helga Luber	Czechoslovakia; Jana Zvěřinová; Bohumila Kapplová; Ludmila Polesná	West Germany; Bärbel Körner; Heide Schröter; Kirsten Stumpf
1969 Bourg St.-Maurice	West Germany; Ulrike Deppe; Bärbel Körner; Brigitte Schwack	Czechoslovakia; Bohumila Kapplová; Ludmila Polesná; Jana Zvěřinová	–
1971 Meran	East Germany; Angelika Bahmann; Veronika Stampe; Dagmar Kriste	West Germany; Ulrike Deppe; Ursula Heinrich; Bärbel Körner	Czechoslovakia; Bohumila Kapplová; Ludmila Polesná; Irena Komancová
1973 Muotathal	United States; Candice Clark; Louise Holcombe; Lyn Ashton	Switzerland; Elisabeth Käser; Danielle Kamber; Eva Karel	East Germany; Sybille Spindler; Marion Bauman; Martina Falke
1975 Skopje	Switzerland; Elisabeth Käser; Danielle Kamber; Cornelia Bachofner	East Germany; Angelika Bahmann; Petra Krol; Marion Bauman	Czechoslovakia; Ludmila Polesná; Bohumila Kapplová; Jana Kubovčáková
1977 Spittal	Switzerland; Elisabeth Käser; Kathrin Weiss; Claire Costa	East Germany; Angelika Bahmann; Birgit Feydt; Petra Krol	United States; Cathy Hearn; Jean Campbell; Linda Harrison
1979 Jonquière	United States; Cathy Hearn; Linda Harrison; Becky Judd	West Germany; Ulrike Deppe; Elke Dietze; Gabriele Köllmann	Switzerland; Kathrin Weiss; Sabine Weiss; Alena Kucera
1981 Bala	West Germany; Ulrike Deppe; Susanne Erbers; Gabriele Köllmann	Great Britain; Elizabeth Sharman; Jane Roderick; Susan Small	United States; Linda Harrison; Cathy Hearn; Yuri Kusuda
1983 Meran	France; Myriam Jerusalmi; Sylvie Arnaud; Marie-Françoise Grange	Great Britain; Elizabeth Sharman; Jane Roderick; Susan Garriock	Czechoslovakia; Marcela Košťálová; Eva Stavařová; Marcela Kubričanová
1985 Augsburg	France; Myriam Jerusalmi; Sylvie Arnaud; Marie-Françoise Grange	West Germany; Gabi Schmid; Margit Messelhäuser; Ulla Steinle	Great Britain; Elizabeth Sharman; Gail Allan; Karen Davies
1987 Bourg St.-Maurice	West Germany; Margit Messelhäuser; Ulla Steinle; Elisabeth Micheler	France; Myriam Jerusalmi; Marie-Françoise Grange-Prigent; Sylvie Arnaud	United States; Cathy Hearn; Dana Chladek; Maylon Hanold
1989 Savage River	France; Myriam Jerusalmi; Marie-Françoise Grange-Prigent; Anne Boixel	United States; Dana Chladek; Cathy Hearn; Jennifer Stone	Czechoslovakia; Zdenka Grossmannová; Štěpánka Hilgertová; Marcela Hilgertová
1991 Tacen	France; Myriam Jerusalmi; Anouk Loubie; Marianne Agulhon	Czechoslovakia; Zdenka Grossmannová; Štěpánka Hilgertová; Marcela Sadilová	United States; Kirsten Brown-Fleshman; Dana Chladek; Kara Ruppel
1993 Mezzana	France; Myriam Jerusalmi; Sylvie Lepeltier; Anne Boixel	United States; Jana Freeburn; Cathy Hearn; Dana Chladek	Great Britain; Maria Lund; Rachel Crosbee; Lynn Simpson
1995 Nottingham	France; Myriam Fox-Jerusalmi; Anne Boixel; Isabelle Despres	Great Britain; Lynn Simpson; Rachel Crosbee; Heather Corrie	Germany; Evi Huss; Elisabeth Micheler-Jones; Kordula Striepecke
1997 Três Coroas	Germany; Evi Huss; Kordula Striepecke; Mandy Planert	France; Anouk Loubie; Anne Boixel; Brigitte Guibal	Great Britain; Rachel Crosbee; Lynn Simpson; Heather Corrie
1999 La Seu d'Urgell	Germany; Susanne Hirt; Evi Huss; Mandy Planert	United States; Mary Marshall Seaver; Rebecca Bennett; Sarah Leith	Great Britain; Heather Corrie; Rachel Crosbee; Amy Casson
2002 Bourg St.-Maurice	France; Aline Tornare; Mathilde Pichery; Anne-Lise Bardet	Czech Republic; Marie Řihošková; Marcela Sadilová; Irena Pavelková	Great Britain; Helen Reeves; Laura Blakeman; Heather Corrie
2003 Augsburg	Czech Republic; Štěpánka Hilgertová; Vanda Semerádová; Irena Pavelková	Germany; Jennifer Bongardt; Claudia Bär; Mandy Planert	Great Britain; Helen Reeves; Heather Corrie; Laura Blakeman
2005 Penrith	Czech Republic; Irena Pavelková; Marcela Sadilová; Štěpánka Hilgertová	Great Britain; Heather Corrie; Kimberley Walsh; Laura Blakeman	Austria; Julia Schmid; Corinna Kuhnle; Violetta Oblinger-Peters
2006 Prague	France; Émilie Fer; Mathilde Pichery; Marie Gaspard	Czech Republic; Štěpánka Hilgertová; Irena Pavelková; Marie Řihošková	Germany; Jennifer Bongardt; Claudia Bär; Jasmin Schornberg
2007 Foz do Iguaçu	Germany; Jennifer Bongardt; Mandy Planert; Jasmin Schornberg	Czech Republic; Štěpánka Hilgertová; Irena Pavelková; Marcela Sadilová	Great Britain; Fiona Pennie; Laura Blakeman; Lizzie Neave
2009 La Seu d'Urgell	Great Britain; Lizzie Neave; Louise Donington; Laura Blakeman	Slovakia; Jana Dukátová; Elena Kaliská; Gabriela Stacherová	Germany; Jasmin Schornberg; Claudia Bär; Jacqueline Horn
2010 Tacen	Czech Republic; Štěpánka Hilgertová; Irena Pavelková; Marie Řihošková	Germany; Jennifer Bongardt; Jasmin Schornberg; Melanie Pfeifer	Slovenia; Eva Terčelj; Nina Mozetič; Urša Kragelj
2011 Bratislava	Slovakia; Elena Kaliská; Jana Dukátová; Dana Mann	Czech Republic; Štěpánka Hilgertová; Irena Pavelková; Kateřina Kudějová	Germany; Jasmin Schornberg; Melanie Pfeifer; Claudia Bär
2013 Prague	Czech Republic; Štěpánka Hilgertová; Kateřina Kudějová; Eva Ornstová	Germany; Jasmin Schornberg; Claudia Bär; Cindy Pöschel	Slovenia; Urša Kragelj; Eva Terčelj; Ajda Novak
2014 Deep Creek Lake	France; Émilie Fer; Carole Bouzidi; Nouria Newman	Austria; Corinna Kuhnle; Lisa Leitner; Viktoria Wolffhardt	Slovakia; Elena Kaliská; Jana Dukátová; Kristína Nevařilová
2015 London	Czech Republic; Kateřina Kudějová; Veronika Vojtová; Štěpánka Hilgertová	Great Britain; Fiona Pennie; Kimberley Woods; Lizzie Neave	France; Carole Bouzidi; Marie-Zélia Lafont; Émilie Fer
2017 Pau	Germany; Jasmin Schornberg; Ricarda Funk; Lisa Fritsche	Austria; Corinna Kuhnle; Lisa Leitner; Viktoria Wolffhardt	Australia; Jessica Fox; Rosalyn Lawrence; Kate Eckhardt
2018 Rio de Janeiro	France; Lucie Baudu; Marie-Zélia Lafont; Camille Prigent	Germany; Ricarda Funk; Jasmin Schornberg; Lisa Fritsche	Great Britain; Mallory Franklin; Fiona Pennie; Kimberley Woods
2019 La Seu d'Urgell	Great Britain; Mallory Franklin; Fiona Pennie; Kimberley Woods	Czech Republic; Kateřina Kudějová; Veronika Vojtová; Amálie Hilgertová	Russia; Ekaterina Perova; Marta Kharitonova; Alsu Minazova
2021 Bratislava	Great Britain; Kimberley Woods; Fiona Pennie; Mallory Franklin	Czech Republic; Kateřina Minařík Kudějová; Antonie Galušková; Lucie Nesnídalová	Slovakia; Eliška Mintálová; Jana Dukátová; Soňa Stanovská
2022 Augsburg	Germany; Ricarda Funk; Elena Lilik; Jasmin Schornberg	Slovenia; Eva Terčelj; Eva Alina Hočevar; Ajda Novak	Poland; Klaudia Zwolińska; Natalia Pacierpnik; Dominika Brzeska
2023 London	Australia; Jessica Fox; Noemie Fox; Kate Eckhardt	Spain; Maialen Chourraut; Laia Sorribes; Olatz Arregui	Great Britain; Mallory Franklin; Kimberley Woods; Phoebe Spicer
2025 Penrith	Czech Republic; Gabriela Satková; Lucie Nesnídalová; Antonie Galušková	Germany; Ricarda Funk; Elena Lilik; Emily Apel	Slovenia; Eva Alina Hočevar; Ajda Novak; Lea Novak
2026 Oklahoma City	Australia; Kate Eckhardt; Jessica Fox; Noemie Fox	France; Emma Vuitton; Camille Prigent; Marjorie Delassus	Slovakia; Eliška Mintálová; Soňa Stanovská; Zuzana Paňková

- Medal table

Rank	Nation	Gold	Silver	Bronze	Total
1	France (FRA)	10	3	1	14
2	East Germany	7	3	1	11
3	Czech Republic (CZE)	6	6	0	12
4	Germany (GER)	5	5	4	14
5	West Germany	3	6	2	11
6	Great Britain (GBR)	3	5	9	17
7	United States (USA)	2	3	4	9
8	Austria (AUT)	2	2	3	7
9	Switzerland (SUI)	2	2	2	6
10	Australia (AUS)	2	0	1	3
11	Czechoslovakia	1	5	5	11
12	Slovakia (SVK)	1	1	3	5
13	Slovenia (SLO)	0	1	3	4
14	Spain (ESP)	0	1	0	1
15	Poland (POL)	0	0	1	1
15	Russia (RUS)	0	0	1	1
Totals (16 entries)		44	43	40	127

== Kayak cross ==
Debuted: 2017 (as extreme kayak)

Championships	Gold	Silver	Bronze
2017 Pau	Caroline Trompeter (GER)	Ana Sátila (BRA)	Amálie Hilgertová (CZE)
2018 Rio de Janeiro	Ana Sátila (BRA)	Martina Wegman (NED)	Polina Mukhgaleeva (RUS)
2019 Prague	Veronika Vojtová (CZE)	Polina Mukhgaleeva (RUS)	Caroline Trompeter (GER)
2021 Bratislava	Jessica Fox (AUS)	Elena Apel (GER)	Evy Leibfarth (USA)
2022 Augsburg	Jessica Fox (AUS)	Kimberley Woods (GBR)	Mònica Dòria Vilarrubla (AND)
2023 London	Kimberley Woods (GBR)	Camille Prigent (FRA)	Eva Terčelj (SLO)
2025 Penrith	Angèle Hug (FRA)	Camille Prigent (FRA)	Klaudia Zwolińska (POL)
2026 Oklahoma City	Alena Marx (SUI)	Noemie Fox (AUS)	Miren Lazkano (ESP)

- Medal table

Rank	Nation	Gold	Silver	Bronze	Total
1	Australia (AUS)	2	1	0	3
2	France (FRA)	1	2	0	3
3	Germany (GER)	1	1	1	3
4	Brazil (BRA)	1	1	0	2
4	Great Britain (GBR)	1	1	0	2
6	Czech Republic (CZE)	1	0	1	2
7	Switzerland (SUI)	1	0	0	1
8	Russia (RUS)	0	1	1	2
9	Netherlands (NED)	0	1	0	1
10	Andorra (AND)	0	0	1	1
10	Poland (POL)	0	0	1	1
10	Slovenia (SLO)	0	0	1	1
10	Spain (ESP)	0	0	1	1
10	United States (USA)	0	0	1	1
Totals (14 entries)		8	8	8	24

== Kayak cross individual ==
Debuted: 2025

Championships	Gold	Silver	Bronze
2025 Penrith	Alena Marx (SUI)	Ajda Novak (SLO)	Ana Sátila (BRA)
2026 Oklahoma City	Jessica Fox (AUS)	Kateřina Beková (CZE)	Lois Leaver (GBR)

- Medal table

Rank	Nation	Gold	Silver	Bronze	Total
1	Australia (AUS)	1	0	0	1
1	Switzerland (SUI)	1	0	0	1
3	Czech Republic (CZE)	0	1	0	1
3	Slovenia (SLO)	0	1	0	1
5	Brazil (BRA)	0	0	1	1
5	Great Britain (GBR)	0	0	1	1
Totals (6 entries)		2	2	2	6
