= Dirk Bovensmann =

Medal record

Men's canoe slalom

Representing West Germany

World Championships
Silver medal – second place	1983 Merano	K-1 team

Dirk Bovensmann is a former West German slalom canoeist who competed in the K-1 class during the 1970s and 1980s, representing the club Kanu- und Surf-Verein Schwerte. At the 1983 ICF Canoe Slalom World Championships in Merano, Italy, he won a silver medal in the K-1 team event. At the German Championships, he won four senior gold medals and two senior silver medals, including the individual K-1 title in 1984.

== Career ==
=== Early career ===
He began competing at national level as a child. At the 1973 German Championships, Bovensmann finished second in the K-1 event in the under-12 category and won the silver medal. In the under-14 category, he won the K-1 team event in 1975 and both the individual K-1 and K-1 team events in 1976.

In 1978, Bovensmann won both the K-1 and K-1 team events in the under-16 category. He won the K-1 team event in the under-18 category in 1979 and finished third in the individual K-1 event in 1980.

=== Senior career ===
==== German Championships ====
Bovensmann's recorded senior results begin in 1982, when he finished second in the K-1 team event at the German Championships. He won the same event in 1983.

The 1984 German Championships were held on the Lenne at Hohenlimburg on 6–7 October. Bovensmann won the men's K-1 individual event, with Peter Micheler finishing second and Jürgen Kübler third. He also won the K-1 team event with Michael Seibert and Dietmar Wiese.

Bovensmann won the K-1 team title again in 1986. He finished second in the event in 1987.

==== International competition ====
Bovensmann represented West Germany in the European Cup, finishing tenth in the overall standings in 1982. He also competed at the ICF Canoe Slalom World Championships.

At the 1983 ICF Canoe Slalom World Championships in Merano, Bovensmann finished 34th in the individual K-1 event. In the K-1 team event, he competed alongside Toni Prijon and Peter Micheler. The West German team scored 235.16 points and finished second, behind Great Britain and ahead of Czechoslovakia.

== Results ==
Dirk Bovensmann: results by year
Year	Competition	Event	Position	Medal
1973	German Championships (under-12)	K-1	2nd	Silver
1975	German Championships (under-14)	K-1 team	1st	Gold
1976	German Championships (under-14)	K-1	1st	Gold
1976	German Championships (under-14)	K-1 team	1st	Gold
1978	German Championships (under-16)	K-1	1st	Gold
1978	German Championships (under-16)	K-1 team	1st	Gold
1979	German Championships (under-18)	K-1 team	1st	Gold
1980	German Championships (under-18)	K-1	3rd	Bronze
1982	European Cup	Overall standings	10th	—
1982	German Championships	K-1 team	2nd	Silver
1983	World Championships	K-1	34th	—
1983	World Championships	K-1 team	2nd	Silver
1983	German Championships	K-1 team	1st	Gold
1984	German Championships	K-1	1st	Gold
1984	German Championships	K-1 team	1st	Gold
1986	German Championships	K-1 team	1st	Gold
1987	German Championships	K-1 team	2nd	Silver
