= Anneliese =

Feminine given name

- Gender: Female
- Language: German

Origin
- Meaning: "Grace" "favor"

Other names
- See also: Annaliese, Analiese

Anneliese (/ˈænəliːs/, German pronunciation: [ˈʔanəˌliːzə]) is a female given name of either German, Dutch or Nordic origin. It is a compound form of "Anna" and "Liese", a short form of "Elisabeth".

It may refer to:

- Anneliese Augustin (1930–2021), German politician
- Anneliese Bauer, East German slalom canoer who competed in the late 1950s and early 1960s
- Anneliese Bläsing (1923–1996), German politician
- Anneliese Borwitz, German slalom canoeist
- Anneliese Brandler (1904–1970), German chess player
- Anneliese Bulling (1900–2004), German-American art historian
- Anneliese Dodds (born 1978), British politician
- Anneliese Dørum (1939–2000), Norwegian politician for the Labour Party
- Annelise Ebbe (1950–2020), Danish peace activist and translator
- Anneliese Gerhards (born 1935), German athlete
- Anneliese Graes (1930–1992), German detective
- Anneliese Groscurth (1910–1996), member an antifascist German resistance group in Berlin during the Nazi era
- Anneliese Heard (born 1981), Welsh triathlete from Bassaleg near Newport, Wales
- Anneliese Hitzenberger (1905–2003), Austrian physician
- Anneliese Kaplan (1933–2020), German actress
- Anneliese Kapp (1908–1972), German diver
- Anneliese Kitzmüller (born 1959), Austrian politician
- Anneliese Knoop-Graf (1921–2009), German resistance fighter
- Anneliese Kohlmann (1921–1977), German SS camp guard
- Anneliese Küppers (1929–2010), German equestrian
- Anneliese Maier (1905–1971), German historian of science
- Anneliese Meggl (born 1938), German alpine skier
- Anneliese Michel (1952–1976), German Catholic woman, supposedly disturbed with demons, who underwent an exorcism
- Anneliese Midgley (born 1976), British politician
- Anneliese Müller (1911–2011), German operatic alto and mezzo-soprano
- Anneliese Probst (1926–2011), German writer
- Anneliese Rockenbach (born 1943), Venezuelan swimmer
- Anneliese Rothenberger (1924–2010), German operatic soprano
- Anneliese Rubie (born 1992), Australian sprinter
- Anneliese Schönnenbeck (1919–2020), German film editor
- Anneliese Schuh-Proxauf (1922–2020), Austrian former alpine skier who competed in the 1948 Winter Olympics
- Anneliese Seidel, German slalom canoeist
- Anneliese Seonbuchner (1929–2020), German hurdler
- Anneliese Seubert (born 1973), Australian model
- Anneliese Uhlig (1918–2007), German-born actress
- Anneliese van der Pol (born 1984), Dutch-American actress and singer
- Anneliese von Oettingen (1917–2002), ballerina and influential ballet teacher and choreographer

== Annelise ==
Annelise or Annalise is a Danish female given name. The German spelling (pronounced identically) is Anneliese or Annaliese. The name may refer to:

- Annalise Basso (born 1998), American actress
- Annalise Braakensiek (born 1972), Australian model
- Annelise Coberger (born 1971), New Zealand skier
- Annalise Hartman, fictional character of the Australian soap opera Neighbours
- Annelise Hesme (born 1976), French actress
- Annelise Høegh (1948–2015), Norwegian politician
- Annelise Hovmand (born 1924), Danish filmmaker
- Annelise Josefsen (born 1949), Norwegian-Sami artist
- Annalise Keating, fictional character of the American legal drama thriller How to Get Away with Murder
- Annelise Knudtzon (1914–2006), Norwegian textile artist
- Annelise Koster (born 1999), Namibian artistic gymnast
- Annelise Kretschmer (1903–1987), German photographer
- Annelise Loevlie, American CEO
- Annelise Löffler (1914–2000), German photographer
- Annalise Murphy (born 1990), Irish sailor
- Annelise Damm Olesen (born 1942), Danish middle-distance runner
- Annalise Pickrel (born 1992), American basketball player
- Annelise Reenberg (1919–1994), Danish filmmaker
- Annelise Riles (born 1966), American legal scholar
- Annelise Rüegg (1879–1934), Swiss communist, pacifist, activist and writer

== See also ==
- Anne Frank's full first name was Annelies
- Annelies
- Annelles
- Anne-Lise
