= Kupper =

Kupper or Kuppers (also Küpper and Küppers) is a surname of Germanic origin meaning maker or repairer of wooden vessels. It is related to the English surname Cooper.

== People ==
- Alex Kupper (born 1990), American football player
- András Kupper (born 1964), Hungarian physician and politician
- Annelies Kupper (1906-1987), German operatic soprano
- Anneliese Küppers (1929–2010), German equestrian and Olympic medalist
- Daniel Kupper (1952), American psychologist
- Eduardo Ferreyros Kuppers, Peruvian politician and Minister of Foreign Commerce and Tourism
- Eileen Küpper, South African singer
- Eric Kupper, American remixer
- Ernst-Joachim Küppers (1942–2025), German swimmer
- Hans Küppers (1938–2021), German footballer
- Herbert Kupper (1914–1994), American psychoanalyst
- Jochen Küpper (born 1971), German physicist and chemist
- Josef Kupper (1932-2017), Swiss chess master
- Ketti Kupper (born 1951), American artist and designer
- Kurt Küppers (1894–1971), German World War I fighter pilot
- Martin Kupper (born 1989), Estonian discus thrower
- Petra Kuppers (born 1968), German-American artist and disability culture activist
- Paul Kupper (died 1908), American sculptor and creator of Eight Stone Lions
- Stephan Küppers, West German slalom canoer
- Thomas Kupper (born 1953), American physician and medical researcher
- Topsy Küppers (1931–2025), Austrian actress, singer, and writer

== Places ==
- Nowa Kopernia, a village in Poland whose German name is Küpper
