= Alfred Baum =

Alfred Baum may refer to:

- Alfred Baum (athlete) (born 1952), West German slalom canoer
- Alfred Baum (composer) (1904–1993), Swiss composer, pianist, and organist
