= Steinle =

Steinle is a German-language surname. Notable people with the surname include:

- Eduard Von Steinle (1810–1886), an Austrian painter
- Roland J. Steinle (1896–1966), an American judge
- Ulla Steinle, a West German canoeist
- Kathryn Steinle (1982–2015), an American woman fatally shot by an illegal alien in 2015

== See also ==
- Steinle Turret Machine Company, a historic building in Madison, Wisconsin
