= Bachofner =

Bachofner is a surname. Notable people with the surname include:

- Carol Bachofner, Native American poet
- Cornelia Bachofner, Swiss slalom canoeist
- Wolf Bachofner (born 1961), Austrian stage and film actor
