= Karel Kumpfmüller =

Medal record

Men's canoe slalom

Representing Czechoslovakia

World Championships
Gold medal – first place	1967 Lipno	C-1 team
Bronze medal – third place	1967 Lipno	C-1

Karel Kumpfmüller is a retired Czechoslovak-Canadian slalom canoeist who competed from the late 1960s to the late 1970s. He won two medals at the 1967 ICF Canoe Slalom World Championships in Lipno nad Vltavou, with a gold in the C-1 team event and a bronze in the C-1 event.
