= František Slavík =

Czechoslovak slalom canoeist

Medal record

Men's canoe slalom

Representing Czechoslovakia

World Championships
| Gold medal – first place | 1983 Meran | C-2 team |

František Slavík is a former Czechoslovak slalom canoeist who competed in the 1980s.

He won a gold medal in the C-2 team event at the 1983 ICF Canoe Slalom World Championships in Meran.
