= Dagmar Sickert =

East German slalom canoeist

Medal record

Women's canoe slalom

Representing East Germany

World Championships
Gold medal – first place	1967 Lipno	K-1 team

Dagmar Sickert is a former East German slalom canoeist who competed in the 1960s.

She won a gold medal in the K-1 team event at the 1967 ICF Canoe Slalom World Championships in Lipno.
