= Nenninger =

Nenninger is a surname. Notable people with the surname include:

- Eric Nenninger (fl. 2000), American actor
- Klaus Nenninger (fl. 1960s–1970s), West German slalom canoeist
