= Theo Nüsing =

Medal record

Men's canoe slalom

Representing West Germany

World Championships
Silver medal – second place	1971 Meran	C-2 team

Theodor "Theo" Nüsing (born 7 May 1950 in Zons) is a West German retired slalom canoeist who competed in the 1970s. He won a silver medal in the C-2 team event at the 1971 ICF Canoe Slalom World Championships in Meran. Nüsing also finished ninth in the C-2 event at the 1972 Summer Olympics in Munich.
