= Garriock =

Garriock is a surname. Notable people with the surname include:

- Ann Garriock (1857–1929), British nurse
- Heather Garriock (born 1982), Australian soccer player and coach
- Susan Garriock, British slalom canoeist

== See also ==
- Garrick (name)
