= Barbara Sattler =

Barbara Sattler may refer to:

- Barbara Sattler-Kovacevic (born 1948), Austrian retired slalom canoeist
- Barbara Sattler (philosopher), British philosopher
