= Jürgen Kübler =

West German slalom canoeist

Medal record

Men's canoe slalom

Representing West Germany

World Championships
Gold medal – first place	1985 Augsburg	K-1 team

Jürgen Kübler is a former West German slalom canoeist who competed in the 1980s.

He won a gold medal in the K-1 team event at the 1985 ICF Canoe Slalom World Championships in Augsburg.
