= Ulrich Weber =

Medal record

Men's canoe slalom

Representing West Germany

World Championships
Silver medal – second place	1985 Augsburg	C-1 team

Ulrich Weber is a former West German slalom canoeist who competed in the mid-1980s. He won a silver medal in the C-1 team event at the 1985 ICF Canoe Slalom World Championships in Augsburg.
