= Gabriel Janoušek =

Czech slalom canoeist (born 1940)

Medal record

Men's canoe slalom

Representing Czechoslovakia

World Championships
Silver medal – second place	1967 Lipno	C2
Silver medal – second place	1967 Lipno	C2 team
Bronze medal – third place	1971 Meran	C2 team

Gabriel Janoušek (born 29 November 1940 in Turnov) is a Czech retired slalom canoeist who competed for Czechoslovakia in the 1960s and 1970s.

Janoušek won three medals at the ICF Canoe Slalom World Championships with two silvers (C2: 1967, C2 team: 1967) and a bronze (C2 team: 1971). He also finished 11th in the C2 event at the 1972 Summer Olympics in Munich.
