= Jiří Decastelo =

Czechoslovak slalom canoeist

Medal record

Men's slalom canoeing

Representing Czechoslovakia

World Championships
Gold medal – first place	1983 Meran	C-2 team

Jiří Decastelo is a former Czechoslovak slalom canoeist who competed in the 1980s.

He won a gold medal in the C-2 team event at the 1983 ICF Canoe Slalom World Championships in Meran.
