= Jeremy Taylor (canoeist) =

British slalom canoeist

Medal record

Men's canoe slalom

Representing Great Britain

World Championships
| Bronze medal – third place | 1983 Meran | C-1 team |

Jeremy Taylor is a former British slalom canoeist who competed in the 1980s. He won a bronze medal in the C-1 team event at the 1983 ICF Canoe Slalom World Championships in Meran.
