= Ulrich Opelt =

German canoeist

Medal record

Men's canoe slalom

Representing East Germany

World Championships
Gold medal – first place	1971 Meran	C-2 team
Bronze medal – third place	1971 Meran	C-2

Ulrich Opelt is an East German retired slalom canoeist who competed in the early 1970s. He won two medals at the 1971 ICF Canoe Slalom World Championships in Meran with a gold in the C-2 team event and a bronze in the C-2 event.
