= Ľudovít Tkáč =

Czechoslovak slalom canoeist

Medal record

Men's canoe slalom

Representing Czechoslovakia

World Championships
Gold medal – first place	1983 Meran	C2 team

Ľudovít Tkáč is a former Czechoslovak slalom canoeist of Slovak nationality who competed in the 1980s in the C2 discipline together with his partner in the boat Dušan Zaťko.

Tkáč and Zaťko participated in two World Championships, winning a gold medal in the C2 team event at the 1983 World Championships in Meran.

== Major championships results timeline ==
Event		1981	1982	1983
World Championships	C2	10	Not held	6
World Championships	C2 team	6	Not held	1
