= Walter Hofmann =

East German slalom canoeist

Medal record

Men's canoe slalom

Representing East Germany

Olympic Games
Gold medal – first place	1972 Munich	C-2

World Championships
Gold medal – first place	1971 Meran	C-2 team
Gold medal – first place	1975 Skopje	C-2 team
Gold medal – first place	1977 Spittal	C-2
Silver medal – second place	1971 Meran	C-2

Walter Hofmann (born 26 September 1949 in Sömmerda) is a former East German slalom canoeist who competed in the 1970s. He won a gold medal in the C-2 event at the 1972 Summer Olympics in Munich.

Hofmann also won four medals at the ICF Canoe Slalom World Championships with three golds (C-2: 1977; C-2 team: 1971, 1975) and a silver (C-2: 1971).
