= Edward Florian =

Polish canoeist

Medal record

Men's canoe slalom

Representing Poland

World Championships
Bronze medal – third place	1985 Augsburg	C-1 team

Edward Florian is a former Polish slalom canoeist who competed in the early-to-mid-1980s. He won a bronze medal in the C-1 team event at the 1985 ICF Canoe Slalom World Championships in Augsburg.
