= Pascal Marinot =

French canoeist (died 2019)

Medal record

Men's canoe slalom

Representing France

World Championships
Silver medal – second place	1985 Augsburg	K-1 team

Pascal Marinot (6 September 1961 – 23 February 2019) was a French slalom canoeist who competed in the 1980s. He won a silver medal in the K-1 team event at the 1985 ICF Canoe Slalom World Championships in Augsburg.
