= Wulf Reinicke =

Medal record

Men's canoe slalom

Representing East Germany

World Championships
Gold medal – first place	1971 Meran	C-1 team
Silver medal – second place	1971 Meran	C-1

Wulf Reinicke is an East German retired slalom canoeist who competed in the early 1970s. He won two medals at the 1971 ICF Canoe Slalom World Championships in Meran with a gold in the C-1 team event and a silver in the C-1 event.
