= Uwe Franz =

East German canoeist

Medal record

Men's canoe slalom

Representing East Germany

World Championships
| Gold medal – first place | 1971 Meran | C-2 team |
| Bronze medal – third place | 1967 Lipno | Mixed C-2 |
| Bronze medal – third place | 1971 Meran | C-2 |

Uwe Franz is an East German retired slalom canoeist who competed in the late 1960s and the early 1970s. He won three medals at the ICF Canoe Slalom World Championships with a gold (C-2 team: 1971) and two bronzes (C-2: 1971, Mixed C-2: 1967).
