= Hans Jakob Hitz =

German canoeist

Medal record

Men's canoe slalom

Representing West Germany

World Championships
Silver medal – second place	1971 Meran	C-2 team

Hans Jakob Hitz (born 12 April 1949 in Zons) is a West German retired slalom canoeist who competed in the 1970s. He won a silver medal in the C-2 team event at the 1971 ICF Canoe Slalom World Championships in Meran. Hitz also finished ninth in the C-2 event at the 1972 Summer Olympics in Munich.
