= Kirsten Stumpf =

Medal record

Women's canoe slalom

Representing West Germany

World Championships
| Bronze medal – third place | 1967 Lipno | K-1 team |

Kirsten Stumpf is a retired West German slalom canoeist who competed in the late 1960s. She won a bronze medal in the K-1 team event at the 1967 ICF Canoe Slalom World Championships in Lipno.
