= Piotr Sarata =

Polish canoeist

Medal record

Men's canoe slalom

Representing Poland

World Championships
Bronze medal – third place	1985 Augsburg	C-1 team

Piotr Sarata is a former Polish slalom canoeist who competed in the 1980s. He won a bronze medal in the C-1 team event at the 1985 ICF Canoe Slalom World Championships in Augsburg.
