= Madison Brass Works =

- U.S. National Register of Historic Places
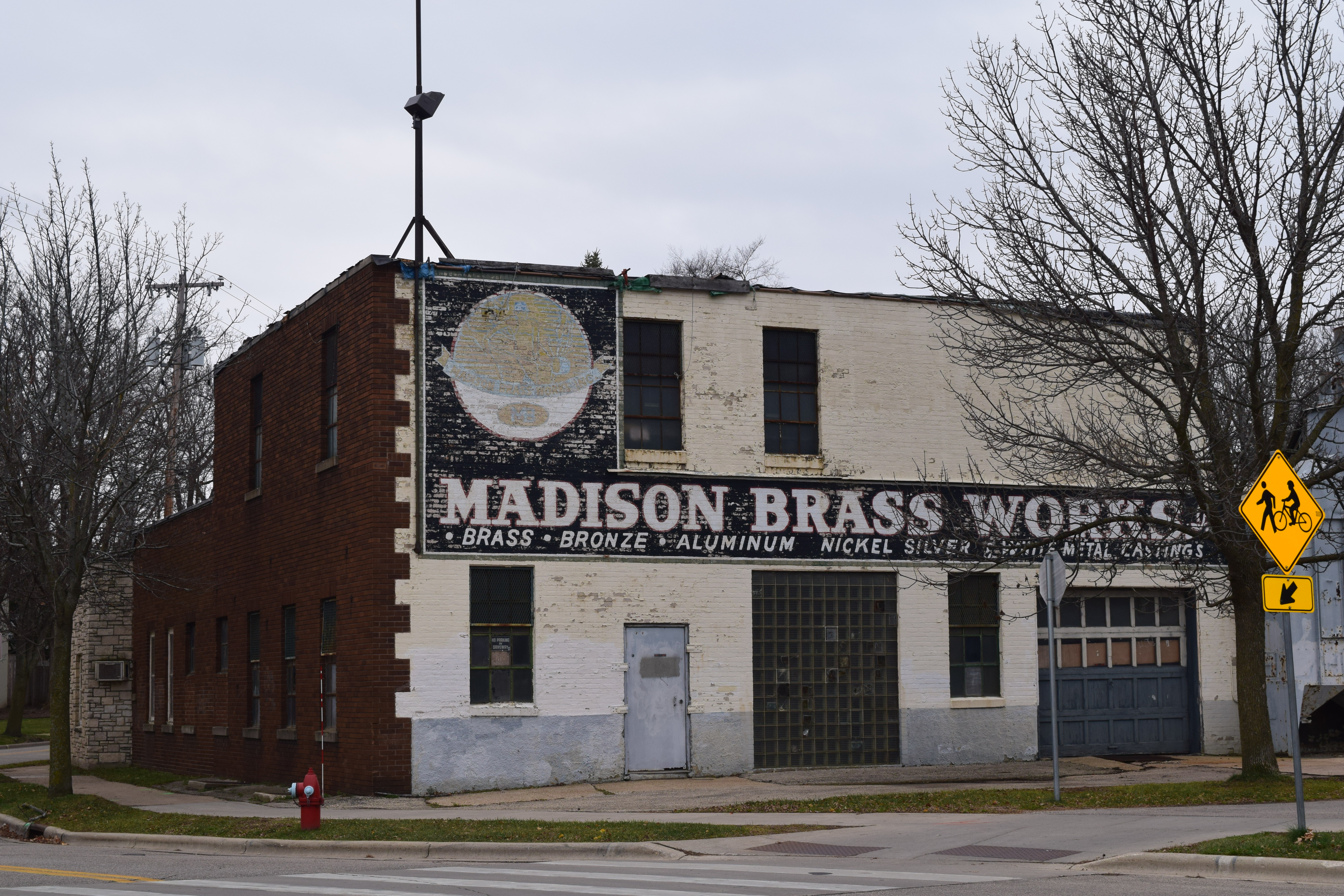
- Madison Brass Works
- Location: 206-214 Waubesa St. Madison, Wisconsin
- Coordinates: 43.09586°N 89.34379°W
- NRHP reference No.: 16000738
- Added to NRHP: October 24, 2016

Madison Brass Works is a small factory complex started in 1918 two miles northeast of the capitol in Madison, Wisconsin for a business that prospered for many decades, despite discriminatory rail freight rates. In 2016 the building was added to the National Register of Historic Places.

== History ==
Founded in 1836, Madison was initially a center of government and education. With the arrival of railroads in the 1860s, the city began to grow as a regional commercial center. In the 1880s manufacturing started to take off, with production of agricultural implements and machine tools. In the early 1900s more industries started, including Ray-o-vac, Oscar Mayer, Mason Kipp Company (machine lubricators), and Scanlan-Morris (hospital equipment). With that generation of manufacturers came a small company called Madison Brass Works.

Madison was not an easy place for manufacturing to grow. In the 1800s, with effects of the early Industrial Revolution in other cities in mind, some of the civic leaders favored white collar government and university jobs, reluctant to soil their beautiful "City of the Four Lakes" with factory chimneys and "grimy workers." The early railroads charged more to ship freight to and from inland cities like Madison than the lakeside cities Chicago and Milwaukee. A source at Fuller and Johnson, which shipped agricultural equipment across the Midwest and West, estimated that rail freight rates added 3% more to their costs than if they had been located in Milwaukee. Discriminatory rail freight rates hampered manufacturing in Madison until around 1930, when regulation and competition from trucking began to level the playing field.

Madison Brass Works was founded in 1907 by Henry Vogts and Edward Schwenn. Vogts was a German immigrant and Schwenn a son of German immigrants who worked in foundries in Beloit and Milwaukee. The pair first built an 18x24 foot wooden building on the site of the current building to house three coke-burning furnaces. They used sand casting to create brass fittings and bronze objects like plaques. The wooden building burned in 1912. They rebuilt a larger brick foundry, but outgrew that by 1917.

By 1918 they had built the earliest brick section of today's complex - 30 by 90 feet. Also that year, partner Edward Schwenn died in the influenza pandemic, leaving Henry Vogts to run the business. In 1929 they expanded the building to add more furnaces. By that time they employed eight and the building had a dirt floor, but this humble operation was dominating the local market for brass castings while producing castings for 90% of the companies that used them in Milwaukee, Racine and Chicago.

In 1936 Henry Vogts reorganized the business into a partnership with his son Harry, who had majored in metallurgy at the UW. They expanded the foundry in 1936 to produce aluminum castings, a new product line. In 1938 and 1941 they added on more space and remodeled the office. By 1941 they had grown to 40 employees, including "15 moulders, four grinder operators, one sandblast operator, two furnace tenders, four core-makers, and 4 laborers."

From 1942 to 1944 the foundry cast torpedo components for the federal government. During this time the War Production Board directed the company to expand the foundry, but lack of building materials during the war forced them to instead rent additional space offsite.

Old Henry worked in the foundry until around 1965. He was particularly proud that he helped cast the Sifting and winnowing plaque on Bascom Hall. Henry died in 1968. After that, Harry became president of the company and Elmer Schwenn supervised the plant for years. The Brass Works continued until around 1994, when Harry Vogts died.

After that, Celestial Stone Foundry & Forge operated in the building until 2014. In 2016 the building was purchased by the Goodman Community Center. That same year the building was placed on the NRHP as a good representative of small manufacturing in Madison, and as a long-lasting small manufacturer.
