= Andrew Smith (canoeist) =

Medal record

Men's canoe slalom

Representing Great Britain

World Championships
Bronze medal – third place	1983 Meran	C-2 team

Andrew Smith is a former British slalom canoeist who competed in the 1980s. He won a bronze medal in the C-2 team event at the 1983 ICF Canoe Slalom World Championships in Meran.
