= Jiří Měchura =

Medal record

Men's canoe slalom

Representing Czechoslovakia

World Championships
| Bronze medal – third place | 1983 Meran | K-1 team |

Jiří Měchura is a former Czechoslovak slalom canoeist who competed from the mid-1970s to the mid-1980s. He won a bronze medal in the K-1 team event at the 1983 ICF Canoe Slalom World Championships in Meran.
