= Paul McConkey =

British slalom canoeist

Medal record

Men's canoe slalom

Representing Great Britain

World Championships
| Gold medal – first place | 1983 Meran | K-1 team |

Paul McConkey (1956 – 16 December 1986) was a British slalom canoeist who competed in the 1980s. He was born in Bilston, Staffordshire.

He won a gold medal in the K-1 team event at the 1983 ICF Canoe Slalom World Championships in Meran.

McConkey was killed in a crash near Stafford, aged 30.
