= Pietrasik =

Pietrasik is a Polish surname. Notable people with the surname include:

- Adam Pietrasik, Polish slalom canoeist
- Ariel Pietrasik (born 1999), Polish handball player
- Damian Pietrasik (born 1986), Polish Paralympic swimmer
