= Luber =

Luber may refer to:

== People ==
- Hans Luber, German diver
- Helga Luber, German canoeist
- Rolf Luber, German canoeist

== Other ==
- Luber, Arkansas, United States
- "Luber", a song from Xiu Xiu's 2002 album Knife Play
