= James Dolan =

James, Jamie or Jim Dolan may refer to:

- James Dolan (rancher) (1848–1898), Old West businessman, cattleman, and key factor in the Lincoln County War
- James Dolan (Wisconsin politician) (1863–1939), American politician
- James Dolan (Irish politician) (1884–1955), Sinn Féin TD from County Leitrim, 1918–1932
- James Dolan (Gaelic footballer), player for Westmeath
- James Dolan (computer security expert) (1981–2017), American computer programmer and security expert
- James H. Dolan (1885–1977), American Jesuit and educator, president of Boston College and Fairfield University
- James Henry Dolan, American criminal
- James Dolan (businessman) (born 1955), American businessman
- Jamie Dolan (1969–2008), Scottish footballer
- Jim Dolan (canoeist), British slalom canoer
- Jim Dolan (sculptor) (born 1949), American sculptor
- Jim Dolan (Neighbours), a fictional character from the Australian soap opera Neighbours
