= Sybille =

Sybille may refer to:

- François Sybille (1906–1968), Belgian boxer
- Princess Elisabeth Sybille of Saxe-Weimar-Eisenach (1854–1908), the first wife of Duke Johann Albrecht of Mecklenburg
- Sybille Bammer (born 1980), Austrian tennis player
- Sybille Bedford (1911–2006), German-born English writer
- Sybille Binder (1895–1962), Austrian actress of Jewish descent
- Sybille Bödecker (born 1948), East German slalom canoeist
- Sybille de Selys Longchamps (born 1941), Belgian aristocrat
- Sybille Gruner (born 1969), German handball player
- Sybille of Bâgé (1255–1294), Countess Consort of Savoy
- Sybille of Cleves (Sibylle von Jülich-Kleve-Berg) (1512–1554), Electress consort of Saxony
- Sybille Pearson (born 1937), Czech playwright, musical theatre lyricist and librettist
- Sybille Reinhardt (born 1957), German rower
- Sybille Schönrock (born 1964), German swimmer
- Sybille Schmidt (born 1967), German rower
- Sybille Schmitz (1909–1955), German actress
- Sybille Spindler, East German slalom canoeist
- Sybille Waury (born 1970), German actress

== See also ==
- Meine Freundin Sybille, East German film
- Sibyl (disambiguation)
