= Rolf-Dieter Amend =

German slalom canoeist (1949–2022)

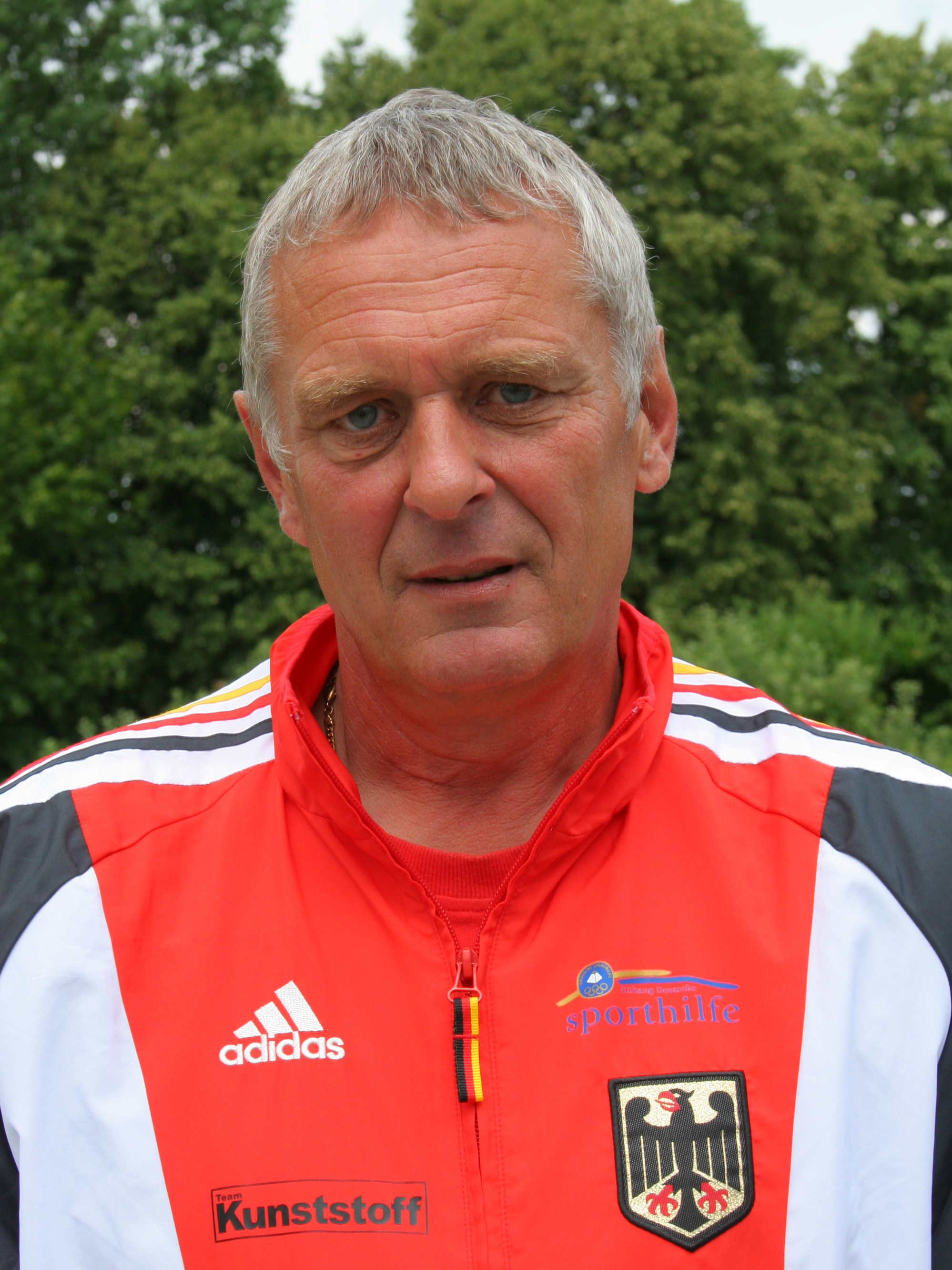
- Amend in 2007

Medal record

Men's canoe slalom

Representing East Germany

Olympic Games
Gold medal – first place	1972 Munich	C-2

World Championships
Gold medal – first place	1971 Meran	C-2 team
Gold medal – first place	1975 Skopje	C-2 team
Silver medal – second place	1971 Meran	C-2

Rolf-Dieter Amend (21 March 1949 – 4 January 2022) was a German slalom canoeist who competed in the 1970s. He won a gold medal in the C-2 event at the 1972 Summer Olympics in Munich.

Amend was born in Magdeburg. He won three medals at the ICF Canoe Slalom World Championships with two golds (C-2 team: 1971, 1975) and a silver (C-2: 1971). He died on 4 January 2022, at the age of 72.
