= Olchawa (surname) =

Olchawa is a Polish surname. Notable people with this surname include:

- Karolina Semeniuk-Olchawa (born 1983), Polish handball player
- Kunegunda Godawska-Olchawa (born 1951), Polish canoeist
