= Peter Keane (canoeist) =

Medal record

Men's canoe slalom

Representing Great Britain

World Championships
Bronze medal – third place	1983 Meran	C-1 team

Peter Keane (born 31 March 1955) is a former British slalom canoeist who competed from the mid-1970s to the late 1980s. He won a bronze medal in the C-1 team event at the 1983 ICF Canoe Slalom World Championships in Meran.
