= Elisabeth Käser =

Swiss slalom canoeist

Medal record

Women's canoe slalom

Representing Switzerland

World Championships
Gold medal – first place	1975 Skopje	K-1 team
Gold medal – first place	1977 Spittal	K-1 team
Silver medal – second place	1973 Muotathal	K-1 team

Elisabeth Käser (born 9 March 1951) is a former Swiss slalom canoeist who competed in the 1970s.

She won three medals in the K-1 team event at the ICF Canoe Slalom World Championships with two golds (1975, 1977) and a silver (1973).

She also finished 20th in the K-1 event at the 1972 Summer Olympics in Munich.
