= Toni Prijon =

West German slalom canoeist

Medal record

Men's canoe slalom

Representing West Germany

World Championships
Gold medal – first place	1985 Augsburg	K-1 team
Gold medal – first place	1987 Bourg St.-Maurice	K-1
Silver medal – second place	1983 Meran	K-1
Silver medal – second place	1983 Meran	K-1 team

Anton "Toni" Prijon is a former West German slalom canoeist who competed in the 1980s.

He won two medals in the K-1 event at the ICF Canoe Slalom World Championships with a gold in 1987 and a silver in 1983. He also won a gold (1985) and a silver (1983) in the K-1 team event at the World Championships.
