= Rosemarie Biesinger =

West German canoeist

Sport
- Sport: Kayaking
- Event: Folding kayak
Medal record
Women's canoe slalom
Representing West Germany
World Championships
Gold medal – first place	1955 Tacen	Folding K-1
Silver medal – second place	1955 Tacen	Folding K-1 team
Silver medal – second place	1957 Augsburg	Folding K-1 team

Rosemarie Biesinger is a retired slalom canoeist who competed for West Germany in the 1950s and the 1960s. She won three medals at the ICF Canoe Slalom World Championships with a gold (Folding K-1: 1955) and two silvers (Folding K-1 team: 1955, 1957).
