= Peter Micheler =

German-Luxembourgish slalom canoeist

Medal record

Men's canoe slalom

Representing West Germany

World Championships
Gold medal – first place	1985 Augsburg	K1 team
Silver medal – second place	1983 Meran	K1 team
Silver medal – second place	1985 Augsburg	K1
Bronze medal – third place	1983 Meran	K1

Peter Micheler is a former West German-Luxembourgish slalom canoeist who competed from the late 1970s to the early 1990s.

He won two medals in the K-1 event at the ICF Canoe Slalom World Championships with a silver in 1985 and a bronze in 1983. He also won a gold (1985) and a silver (1983) in the K-1 team event at the World Championships.

Since 1990 Micheler represented Luxembourg.

== World Cup individual podiums ==
Season	Date	Venue	Position	Event
1988	21 August 1988	Augsburg	1st	K1
1990	11 Aug 1990	Augsburg	3rd	K1
