= Jane Roderick =

British slalom canoeist

Medal record

Women's canoe slalom

Representing Great Britain

World Championships
Silver medal – second place	1981 Bala	K-1 team
Silver medal – second place	1983 Meran	K-1
Silver medal – second place	1983 Meran	K-1 team

Jane Roderick is a British slalom canoeist who competed from the late 1970s to the mid-1980s. She won three silver medals at the ICF Canoe Slalom World Championships, earning them in 1981 (K-1 team) and 1983 (K-1, K-1 team).
