= Gabi Loose =

Former west german slalom canoeist

Medal record

Women's canoe slalom

Representing West Germany

World Championships
Silver medal – second place	1985 Augsburg	K-1 team

Gabiriella Loose is a former West German slalom canoeist who competed in the 1980s. She won a silver medal in the K-1 team event at the 1985 ICF Canoe Slalom World Championships in Augsburg. She has been married for 7 years to her husband Nicolas Dietz.
