= Elsa Oderholz =

Retired Swiss slalom canoeist

Sport
- Sport: Kayaking
- Event: Folding kayak
Medal record
Women's canoe slalom
Representing Switzerland
World Championships
Silver medal – second place	1949 Geneva	Folding K-1 team
Bronze medal – third place	1951 Steyr	Folding K-1 team

Elsa Oderholz is a Swiss retired slalom canoeist who competed from the late 1940s to the mid-1950s. She won two medals in the folding K-1 team event at the ICF Canoe Slalom World Championships with a silver in 1949 and a bronze in 1951.
