= Gabriele Köllmann =

German canoeist

Medal record

Women's canoe slalom

Representing West Germany

World Championships
Gold medal – first place	1981 Bala	K-1 team
Silver medal – second place	1979 Jonquière	K-1 team

Gabriele Köllmann is a former West German slalom canoeist who competed from the late 1970s to the early 1980s.

She won two medals in the K-1 team event at the ICF Canoe Slalom World Championships with a gold in 1981 and a silver in 1979.
