= Dagmar Kriste =

East German slalom canoeist

Medal record

Women's canoe slalom

Representing East Germany

World Championships
Gold medal – first place	1971 Meran	K-1 team

Dagmar Kriste is a former East German slalom canoeist who competed in the 1970s. She won a gold medal in the K-1 team event at the 1971 ICF Canoe Slalom World Championships in Meran.
