= Maria Ćwiertniewicz =

Polish canoeist

Medal record

Women's canoe slalom

Representing Poland

World Championships
Gold medal – first place	1975 Skopje	K-1
Silver medal – second place	1973 Muotathal	K-1

Maria Ćwiertniewicz (born 18 August 1952 in Krościenko nad Dunajcem) is a former Polish slalom canoeist who competed in the 1970s. She won two medals in the K-1 event at the ICF Canoe Slalom World Championships with a gold in 1975 and a silver in 1973.

Ćwiertniewicz also finished fourth in the K-1 event at the 1972 Summer Olympics in Munich.
