= Gail Allan =

British slalom canoeist (born 1965)

Medal record

Women's canoe slalom

Representing Great Britain

World Championships
Bronze medal – third place	1985 Augsburg	K-1
Bronze medal – third place	1985 Augsburg	K-1 team

Gail Allan (born 1965) is a former British slalom canoeist who competed in the 1980s. She won two bronze medals at the 1985 ICF Canoe Slalom World Championships in Augsburg, earning them in the K-1 event and the K-1 team event. Her name is now (2010) Gail King, she lives in Guernsey and competes in Triathlon and Quadrathlon.
