= Canoeing at the 1972 Summer Olympics – Women's slalom K-1 =

These are the results of the women's K-1 slalom competition in canoeing at the 1972 Summer Olympics. The K-1 (kayak single) event is raced by one-person kayaks through a whitewater course. The venue for the 1972 Olympic competition was in Augsburg.

== Medalists ==
Gold	Silver	Bronze
Angelika Bahmann (GDR)	Gisela Grothaus (FRG)	Magdalena Wunderlich (FRG)

== Results ==
The 22 competitors each took two runs through the whitewater slalom course on August 30. The best time of the two runs counted for the event.

Rank	Name	Run 1			Run 2			Result
Rank	Name	Time	Points	Total	Time	Points	Total	Total
Gold	Angelika Bahmann (GDR)	333.07	80	413.07	304.50	60	364.50	364.50
Silver	Gisela Grothaus (FRG)	351.10	170	521.10	338.15	60	398.15	398.15
Bronze	Magdalena Wunderlich (FRG)	340.50	60	400.50	375.40	140	515.40	400.50
4	Maria Ćwiertniewicz (POL)	350.64	100	450.64	342.30	90	432.30	432.30
5	Kunegunda Godawska-Olchawa (POL)	383.26	90	473.26	381.05	60	441.05	441.05
6	Victoria Brown (GBR)	335.07	190	525.07	353.71	90	443.71	443.71
7	Ulrike Deppe (FRG)	306.32	160	466.32	366.44	90	456.44	456.44
8	Bohumila Kapplová (TCH)	396.70	210	606.70	360.16	100	460.16	460.16
9	Lyn Ashton (USA)	341.45	140	481.45	385.41	90	475.41	475.41
10	Martina Falke (GDR)	402.20	80	482.20	-	-	-	482.20
11	Sybille Bödecker (GDR)	382.88	100	482.88	326.10	200	526.10	482.88
12	Danielle Kamber (SUI)	371.81	150	521.81	385.86	200	585.86	521.81
13	Heather Goodman (GBR)	357.50	170	527.50	369.92	180	549.92	527.50
14	Cynthia Goodwin (USA)	336.80	240	576.80	328.50	200	528.50	528.50
15	Louise Holcombe (USA)	387.20	310	697.20	412.30	120	532.30	532.30
16	Ludmila Polesná (TCH)	427.47	110	537.47	351.80	290	641.90	537.47
17	Rosine Roland (BEL)	-	-	-	382.03	170	552.03	552.03
18	Barbara Sattler-Kovacevic (AUT)	387.67	170	557.67	378.88	190	558.88	557.67
19	Biruta Khertseva-Khertsberga (URS)	394.42	220	614.42	398.54	260	658.54	614.42
20	Elisabeth Käser (SUI)	372.88	260	632.88	-	-	-	632.88
21	Pauline Goodwin-Squires (GBR)	-	-	-	373.60	300	673.60	673.60
22	Růžena Novotná (TCH)	469.62	240	709.62	529.80	150	679.80	679.80
