= Bohumila Kapplová =

Medal record

Women's canoe slalom

Representing Czechoslovakia

World Championships
| Silver medal – second place | 1965 Spittal an der Drau | K-1 team |
| Silver medal – second place | 1967 Lipno | K-1 team |
| Silver medal – second place | 1969 Bourg-Saint-Maurice | K-1 team |
| Bronze medal – third place | 1971 Meran | K-1 team |
| Bronze medal – third place | 1975 Skopje | K-1 team |

Bohumila Kapplová (married Bohumila Kordová; born 27 September 1944) is a Czech former slalom canoeist who competed for Czechoslovakia in the 1960s and 1970s. She finished eighth in the K-1 event at the 1972 Summer Olympics in Munich.
