= Marion Bauman =

East German slalom canoeist

Medal record

Women's canoe slalom

Representing East Germany

World Championships
Silver medal – second place	1975 Skopje	K-1 team
Bronze medal – third place	1973 Muotathal	K-1 team

Marion Bauman is a former East German slalom canoeist who competed in the 1970s. She won two medals in the K-1 team event with a silver in 1975 and a bronze in 1973.
