= Eva Setzkorn =

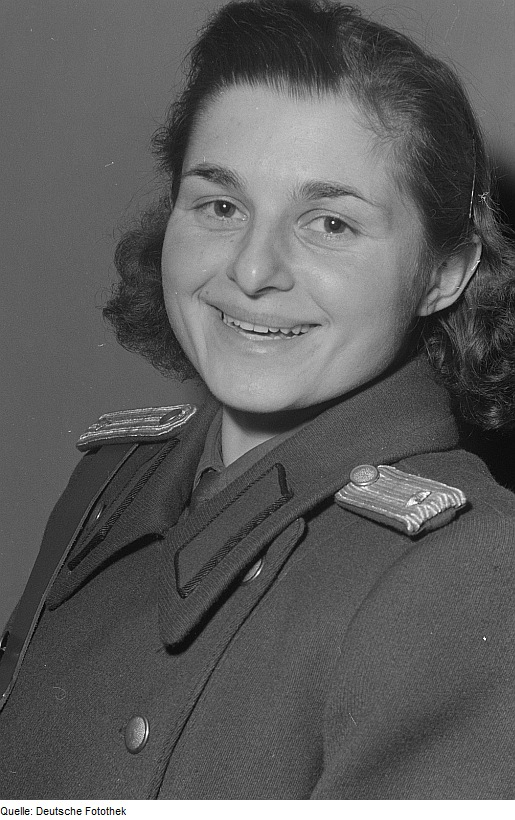

Sport
- Sport: Kayaking
- Event: Folding kayak
Medal record
Women's canoe slalom
Representing East Germany
World Championships
Gold medal – first place	1955 Tacen	Folding K-1 team
Gold medal – first place	1957 Augsburg	Folding K-1 team
Gold medal – first place	1959 Geneva	Folding K-1 team
Silver medal – second place	1953 Meran	Folding K-1
Silver medal – second place	1953 Meran	Folding K-1 team
Silver medal – second place	1957 Augsburg	Folding K-1
Bronze medal – third place	1955 Tacen	Folding K-1

Eva Setzkorn is a retired East German slalom canoeist who competed from the mid-1950s to the early 1960s. She won seven medals at the ICF Canoe Slalom World Championships with three golds (Folding K-1 team: 1955, 1957, 1959), three silvers (Folding K-1: 1953, 1957; Folding K-1 team: 1953) and a bronze (Folding K-1: 1955).
