= Linda Harrison (canoeist) =

American canoeist

Medal record

Women's canoe slalom

Representing United States

World Championships
Gold medal – first place	1979 Jonquière	K-1 team
Bronze medal – third place	1977 Spittal	K-1
Bronze medal – third place	1977 Spittal	K-1 team
Bronze medal – third place	1979 Jonquière	K-1
Bronze medal – third place	1981 Bala	K-1 team

Linda Harrison is an American slalom canoeist who competed in the 1970s and 1980s.

She won two bronze medals in the K-1 event at the ICF Canoe Slalom World Championships, earning them in 1977 and 1979. She also won a gold (1979) and two bronzes (1977, 1981) in the K-1 team event.
