= Irena Komancová =

Czechoslovak retired slalom canoeist

Medal record

Women's canoe slalom

Representing Czechoslovakia

World Championships
Bronze medal – third place	1971 Meran	K-1 team

Irena Komancová is a Czechoslovak retired slalom canoeist who competed in the early 1970s. She won a bronze medal in the K-1 team event at the 1971 ICF Canoe Slalom World Championships in Meran.
