= Alfred Baum (athlete) =

German canoeist

Medal record

Men's canoe slalom

Representing West Germany

World Championships
Bronze medal – third place	1971 Meran	K-1 team

Alfred Baum (born 10 February 1952 in Wickede) is a West German retired slalom canoeist who competed from the late 1960s to the mid-1970s. He won a bronze medal in the K-1 team event at the 1971 ICF Canoe Slalom World Championships in Meran. Baum also finished fifth in the K-1 event at the 1972 Summer Olympics in Munich.
