= Eva Stavařová =

Slalom canoeist

Medal record

Women's canoe slalom

Representing Czechoslovakia

World Championships
Bronze medal – third place	1983 Meran	K-1 team

Eva Stavarová is a former Czechoslovak slalom canoeist who competed in the 1980s. She won a bronze medal in the K-1 team event at the 1983 ICF Canoe Slalom World Championships in Meran.
