= Danielle Kamber =

Swiss canoeist

Medal record

Women's canoe slalom

Representing Switzerland

World Championships
Gold medal – first place	1975 Skopje	K-1 team
Silver medal – second place	1973 Muotathal	K-1 team

Danielle Kamber (born 27 October 1954) is a former Swiss slalom canoeist who competed in the 1970s.

She won two medals in the K-1 team event at the ICF Canoe Slalom World Championships with a gold in 1975 and a silver in 1973.

Kamber finished 12th in the K-1 event at the 1972 Summer Olympics in Munich.
