= Jaroslava Havlová =

Sport
- Sport: Kayaking
- Event: Folding kayak
Medal record
Women's canoe slalom
Representing Czechoslovakia
World Championships
Gold medal – first place	1953 Meran	Folding K-1 team
Bronze medal – third place	1955 Tacen	Folding K-1 team

Jaroslava Havlová is a former Czechoslovak slalom canoeist who competed in the 1950s. She won two medals in the folding K-1 team event at the ICF Canoe Slalom World Championships with a gold in 1953 and a bronze in 1955.
