= Biruta Khertseva-Khertsberga =

Soviet canoeist

Biruta Khertseva-Khertsberga-Kemere (16 November 1944 — 8 March 2022) was a Soviet slalom canoeist who competed in the early 1970s. She finished 19th in the K-1 event at the 1972 Summer Olympics in Munich.
