= Jana Zvěřinová =

Czech retired slalom canoeist

Personal information
- Born: 9 March 1937 (age 89)

Sport
- Country: Czechoslovakia
- Sport: Canoe slalom
Medal record
Women's canoe slalom
Representing Czechoslovakia
World Championships
Silver medal – second place	1963 Spittal an der Drau	Folding K1 team
Silver medal – second place	1967 Lipno nad Vltavou	K1 team
Silver medal – second place	1969 Bourg St.-Maurice	K1 team
Bronze medal – third place	1963 Spittal	Folding K1
Bronze medal – third place	1969 Bourg St.-Maurice	K1

Jana Zvěřinová (born 9 March 1937) is a Czech retired slalom canoeist who competed for Czechoslovakia at the international level from 1961 to 1969.

She won five medals at the ICF Canoe Slalom World Championships with three silvers (Folding K1 team: 1963; K1 team: 1967, 1969) and two bronzes (folding K1: 1963, K1: 1969).
