= Hanni Mendes da Costa =

West German slalom canoeist

Sport
- Sport: Kayaking
- Event: Folding kayak
Medal record
Women's canoe slalom
Representing West Germany
World Championships
Silver medal – second place	1955 Tacen	Folding K-1 team
Silver medal – second place	1957 Augsburg	Folding K-1 team

Hanni Mendes da Costa (née Schulte) is a retired West German slalom canoeist who competed in the mid-to-late 1950s. She won two silver medals in the folding K-1 team event at the ICF Canoe Slalom World Championships, earning them in 1955 and 1957.
