= Brigitte Magnus =

Sport
- Sport: Kayaking
- Event: Folding kayak
Medal record
Women's canoe slalom
Representing East Germany
World Championships
Gold medal – first place	1957 Augsburg	Folding K-1
Gold medal – first place	1957 Augsburg	Folding K-1 team

Brigitte Magnus is a retired East German slalom canoeist who competed in the mid-to-late 1950s. She won two gold medals at the 1957 ICF Canoe Slalom World Championships in Augsburg, earning them in the folding K-1 event and the folding K-1 team event.
