= ICF Masters Canoe Slalom World Championships =

International canoeing event

The ICF Masters Canoe Slalom World Championships are an international event in canoeing organized by the International Canoe Federation.

== Editions ==
#	Year	Host city	Host country
1	2021	Krakow	Poland
2	2024	Krakow	Poland
