= Ursula Heinrich =

German canoeist

Medal record

Women's canoe slalom

Representing West Germany

World Championships
Silver medal – second place	1971 Meran	K-1 team

Ursula Heinrich is a West German retired slalom canoeist who competed in the early 1970s. She won a silver medal in the K-1 team event at the 1971 ICF Canoe Slalom World Championships in Meran.
