= Magdalena Wunderlich =

German canoeist

Medal record

Women's canoe slalom

Representing West Germany

Olympic Games
Bronze medal – third place	1972 Munich	K-1

Magdalena Wunderlich (born May 16, 1952 in Großhesselohe, Pullach) is a West German retired slalom canoeist who competed in the early and mid 1970s. She won a bronze medal in the K-1 event at the 1972 Summer Olympics in Munich.
