= Gerti Pertlwieser =

Austrian canoeist

Personal information
- Born: 7 April 1925
- Died: 12 June 1986 (aged 61)

Sport
- Sport: Kayaking
- Event: Folding kayak
Medal record
Women's canoe slalom
Representing Austria
World Championships
| Gold medal – first place | 1949 Geneva | Folding K-1 team |
| Gold medal – first place | 1951 Steyr | Folding K-1 |
| Gold medal – first place | 1951 Steyr | Folding K-1 team |
| Bronze medal – third place | 1949 Geneva | Folding K-1 |

Gerti Pertlwieser was an Austrian slalom canoeist who competed in the late 1940s and the early 1950s. She won four medals at the ICF Canoe Slalom World Championships with three golds (Folding K-1: 1951; Folding K-1 team: 1949, 1951) and a bronze (Folding K-1: 1949).

Her granddaughter Stephanie Vock is an Austrian tennis player.
