= 2027 ICF Canoe Slalom World Championships =

- Venue: Segre Olympic Park
- Location: La Seu d'Urgell, Spain
- Dates: 7–12 September

The 2027 ICF Canoe Slalom World Championships will be held from in La Seu d'Urgell, Spain from 7 to 12 September 2027.
