= Růžena Novotná =

Czechoslovak retired slalom canoeist (born 1941)

Růžena Novotná (born January 31, 1941, in Plzeň) is a Czechoslovak retired slalom canoeist who competed in the late 1960s and the early 1970s. She finished 22nd in the K-1 event at the 1972 Summer Olympics in Munich.
