= Lia Schilhuber =

Medal record

Women's canoe slalom

Representing East Germany

World Championships
Gold medal – first place	1963 Spittal	Folding K-1 team
Gold medal – first place	1965 Spittal	K-1 team
Silver medal – second place	1965 Spittal	K-1
Silver medal – second place	1967 Lipno	K-1

Lia Schilhuber is a retired East German-Austrian slalom canoeist who competed in the 1960s. She won four medals at the ICF Canoe Slalom World Championships, with two golds (Folding K-1 team: 1963 Spittal, K-1 team: 1965) and two silvers (K-1: 1965, 1967).
