= Karin Tietze =

Sport
- Sport: Kayaking
- Event: Folding kayak
Medal record
Women's canoe slalom
Representing East Germany
World Championships
Gold medal – first place	1955 Tacen	Folding K-1 team
Silver medal – second place	1955 Tacen	Folding K-1

Karin Tietze is a retired East German slalom canoeist who competed in the mid-1950s. She won two medals at the 1955 ICF Canoe Slalom World Championships in Tacen with a gold in the folding K-1 team event and a silver in the folding K-1 event.
