= Cynthia Goodwin =

American canoeist (born 1952)

Cynthia Annice "Cindy" Goodwin (born June 3, 1952, in Newport News, Virginia) is an American retired slalom canoeist who competed in the 1970s. She finished 14th in the K-1 event at the 1972 Summer Olympics in Munich. Now Cynthia Wall, she is currently a retired chemistry teacher at Tuscarora High School in Leesburg, Virginia.
