= Hella Philips =

Austrian canoeist

Sport
- Sport: Kayaking
- Event: Folding kayak
Medal record
Women's canoe slalom
Representing Austria
World Championships
Bronze medal – third place	1957 Augsburg	Folding K-1 team

Hella Philips is an Austrian retired slalom canoeist who competed in the mid-to-late 1950s. She won a bronze medal in the folding K-1 team event at the 1957 ICF Canoe Slalom World Championships in Augsburg.
