= Stephan Küppers =

German canoeist

Medal record

Men's canoe slalom

Representing West Germany

World Championships
Gold medal – first place	1985 Augsburg	C-2

Stephan Küppers is a West German slalom canoeist who competed in the 1980s. He won a gold medal in the C-2 event at the 1985 ICF Canoe Slalom World Championships in Augsburg.
