= Renata Knýová =

Medal record

Women's canoe slalom

Representing Czechoslovakia

World Championships
Silver medal – second place	1963 Spittal	Folding K-1 team
Silver medal – second place	1965 Spittal	K-1 team
Bronze medal – third place	1955 Tacen	Folding K-1 team

Renata Knýová was a Czechoslovak slalom canoeist who competed from the mid-1950s to the late 1960s. She won three medals at the ICF Canoe Slalom World Championships with two silvers (Folding K-1 team: 1963, K-1 team: 1965) and a bronze (Folding K-1 team: 1955).

She died in 2013.
