= Jim Dolan (canoeist) =

British slalom canoeist

Medal record

Men's slalom canoeing

Representing Great Britain

World Championships
Gold medal – first place	1983 Meran	K-1 team

Jim Dolan is a British former slalom canoeist who competed from the mid-1970s to the mid-1980s.

He won a gold medal in the K-1 team event at the 1983 ICF Canoe Slalom World Championships in Meran.
