= Veronika Stampe =

East German canoeist

Medal record

Women's canoe slalom

Representing East Germany

World Championships
| Gold medal – first place | 1971 Meran | K-1 team |
| Bronze medal – third place | 1971 Meran | K-1 |

Veronika Stampe is an East German retired slalom canoeist who competed in the early 1970s. She won two medals at the 1971 ICF Canoe Slalom World Championships in Meran with a gold in the K-1 team event and a bronze in the K-1 event.
