= Sybille Bödecker =

East German slalom canoeist (born 1948)

Sybille Bödecker-Spindler (born 11 November 1948, in Dresden) is an East German retired slalom canoeist who competed in the early and mid-1970s. She finished 11th in the K-1 event at the 1972 Summer Olympics in Munich.
