= 1985 ICF Canoe Slalom World Championships =

Canoe slalom event in Augsburg, West Germany

The 1985 ICF Canoe Slalom World Championships were held between 12 and 16 June 1985 in Augsburg, West Germany under the auspices of International Canoe Federation for the second time. Augsburg hosted the event previously in 1957. It was the 19th edition. It also marked the first time the championships took place on an artificial whitewater slalom course at the Eiskanal and the first to be held at an Olympic venue. The Eiskanal previously hosted the slalom canoeing events at the 1972 Summer Olympics held in neighboring Munich.

== Medal summary ==
=== Men's ===
==== Canoe ====
| Event | Gold | Points | Silver | Points | Bronze | Points |
|---|---|---|---|---|---|---|
| C1 | David Hearn (USA) | 223.21 | Jon Lugbill (USA) | 235.91 | Martyn Hedges (GBR) | 240.30 |
| C1 team | United States; David Hearn; Jon Lugbill; Kent Ford | 280.99 | West Germany; Gerald Moos; Andreas Kübler; Ulrich Weber | 308.71 | Poland; Edward Florian; Piotr Sarata; Adam Pietrasik | 340.07 |
| C2 | West Germany; Thomas Klein-Impelmann; Stephan Küppers | 267.15 | France; Pierre Calori; Jacques Calori | 272.51 | West Germany; Günther Wolkenaer; Fredi Zimmermann | 273.63 |
| C2 team | Czechoslovakia; Jiří Rohan & Miroslav Šimek; Miroslav Hajdučík & Milan Kučera; Viktor Beneš & Ondřej Mohout | 329.11 | France; Pierre Calori & Jacques Calori; Emmanuel del Rey & Thierry Saidi; Michel Saidi & Jérôme Daval | 380.55 | United States; Charles Harris & John Harris; Lecky Haller & Fritz Haller; Paul Grabow & Mike Garvis | 384.03 |

==== Kayak ====
| Event | Gold | Points | Silver | Points | Bronze | Points |
|---|---|---|---|---|---|---|
| K1 | Richard Fox (GBR) | 210.56 | Peter Micheler (FRG) | 220.60 | Luboš Hilgert (TCH) | 221.07 |
| K1 team | West Germany; Peter Micheler; Toni Prijon; Jürgen Kübler | 248.62 | France; Christophe Prigent; Pascal Marinot; Manuel Brissaud | 258.22 | Yugoslavia; Marjan Štrukelj; Janez Skok; Jernej Abramič | 264.75 |

=== Women's ===
==== Kayak ====
| Event | Gold | Points | Silver | Points | Bronze | Points |
|---|---|---|---|---|---|---|
| K1 | Margit Messelhäuser (FRG) | 258.69 | Marie-Françoise Grange (FRA) | 261.18 | Gail Allan (GBR) | 264.25 |
| K1 team | France; Sylvie Arnaud; Marie-Françoise Grange; Myriam Jerusalmi | 382.24 | West Germany; Gabi Schmid; Margit Messelhäuser; Ulla Steinle | 392.41 | United Kingdom; Elizabeth Sharman; Gail Allan; Karen Davies | 457.66 |

== Medals table ==
| Rank | Nation | Gold | Silver | Bronze | Total |
|---|---|---|---|---|---|
| 1 | West Germany (FRG) | 3 | 3 | 1 | 7 |
| 2 | United States (USA) | 2 | 1 | 1 | 4 |
| 3 | France (FRA) | 1 | 4 | 0 | 5 |
| 4 | Great Britain (GBR) | 1 | 0 | 3 | 4 |
| 5 | Czechoslovakia (TCH) | 1 | 0 | 1 | 2 |
| 6 | Poland (POL) | 0 | 0 | 1 | 1 |
| 6 | Yugoslavia (YUG) | 0 | 0 | 1 | 1 |
| Totals (7 entries) | | 8 | 8 | 8 | 24 |
