= Angelika Bahmann =

East German canoeist

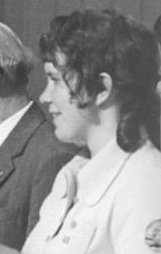
- Bahmann following the 1972 Summer Olympics in Munich

Personal information
- Born: 1 April 1952 (age 74) Plauen, Saxony, GDR
Medal record
Women's canoe slalom
Representing East Germany
Olympic Games
Gold medal – first place	1972 Munich	K-1
World Championships
Gold medal – first place	1971 Meran	K-1
Gold medal – first place	1971 Meran	K-1 team
Gold medal – first place	1977 Spittal	K-1
Silver medal – second place	1975 Skopje	K-1 team
Silver medal – second place	1977 Spittal	K-1 team
Bronze medal – third place	1975 Skopje	K-1

Angelika Bahmann (born 1 April 1952 in Plauen) is a former East German slalom canoeist and trainer who competed in the 1970s. She won a gold medal in the K-1 event at the 1972 Summer Olympics in Munich.

Bahmann also won six medals in the ICF Canoe Slalom World Championships with three golds (K-1: 1971, 1977; K-1 team: 1971), two silvers (K-1 team: 1975, 1977) and a bronze (K-1: 1975).

Bahmann's son, Christian, competed in slalom canoeing for Germany in the late 1990s and 2000s.

== Awards and honours ==
- 1971 Patriotic Order of Merit in bronze
- 1972 Patriotic Order of Merit in silver
