= Ludmila Polesná =

Czech canoeist (1934–1988)

Medal record

Women's canoe slalom

Representing Czechoslovakia

World Championships
Gold medal – first place	1961 Hainsberg	Folding K-1
Gold medal – first place	1963 Spittal an der Drau	Folding K-1
Gold medal – first place	1967 Lipno	K-1
Gold medal – first place	1969 Bourg St.-Maurice	K-1
Silver medal – second place	1963 Spittal	Folding K-1 team
Silver medal – second place	1965 Spittal	K-1 team
Silver medal – second place	1967 Lipno	K-1 team
Silver medal – second place	1969 Bourg St.-Maurice	K-1 team
Silver medal – second place	1971 Meran	K-1
Bronze medal – third place	1971 Meran	K-1 team
Bronze medal – third place	1975 Skopje	K-1 team

Ludmila Polesná (31 August 1934 in Písek – 9 December 1988 in Prague) was a Czech slalom canoeist who competed for Czechoslovakia from the early 1960s to the mid-1970s. She won eleven medals at the ICF Canoe Slalom World Championships with four golds (Folding K-1: 1961, 1963; K-1: 1967, 1969), five silvers (K-1: 1971, K-1 team: 1965, 1967, 1969, Folding K-1 team: 1963) and two bronzes (K-1 team: 1971, 1975).

Polesná also finished 16th in the K-1 event at the 1972 Summer Olympics in Munich.
