= Anneliese Bauer =

East German slalom canoeist

Sport
- Sport: Kayaking
- Event: Folding kayak
Medal record
Women's canoe slalom
Representing East Germany
World Championships
Gold medal – first place	1963 Spittal	Folding K-1 team
Silver medal – second place	1959 Geneva	Folding K-1
Silver medal – second place	1961 Hainberg	Folding K-1

Anneliese Bauer is an East German retired slalom canoeist who competed from the late 1950s to the mid-1960s. She won three medals at the ICF Canoe Slalom World Championships with a gold (Folding K-1 team: 1963) and two silvers (Folding K-1: 1959, 1961).
