= Kunegunda Godawska-Olchawa =

Polish canoeist (born 1951)

Kunegunda Weronika Godawska-Olchawa (born 27 July 1951 in Nowy Sącz) is a Polish retired slalom canoeist who competed in the early 1970s. She finished fifth in the K-1 event at the 1972 Summer Olympics in Munich.
