= Carol Bachofner =

American poet of Abenaki descent

- Education: Vermont College
- Spouse: William Ernest Bachofner
- Children: Erin Jennifer Bachofner Bluett, Lauren Joan Hampton, Kristen Elizabeth Stewart, Katherine Mary Rand
- Relatives: Jenna Elizabeth Bluett, Joseph Charles Bluett, Justin Michael Duncan, Alexander James Duncan, Christopher Adam Rand, Alyssa Paige Hampton, Megan Justine Hampton, Evan Matthew Hampton
- Writing career
- Genre: Poetry
- Notable awards: Rockland Poet laureate

Carol Willette Bachofner is an American poet of Abenaki descent. She currently resides in Rockland, Maine. She is the co-founder and editor of the online literary journal, Pulse, established in 1997. She has also published several collections of her own poetry, including Native Moons, Native Days, as well as Drink from Your Own Wells: a guide to richer writing.

== Career ==
She has been nominated for several literary awards and honors, including Editor of the Year by the Wordcraft Circle of Writers & Storytellers in 1999 and Writer of the Year for her poetry by that same group in 2000.

In April 2012, she was named Rockland Poet Laureate by the City of Rockland, Maine.

== Publications ==
Poetry Collections

- Daughter of the Ardennes Forest: Poems. Charlotte, NC: Main Street Rag Pub., 2007. Print. ISBN 0-375-76081-4, ISBN 978-1599480640.
- Breakfast at the Brass Compass: poems of Mid Coast Maine. Rockland, ME: Heartsounds, 2009. Print. ISBN 0-8050-6727-2, ISBN 978-1-892266-10-1.
- I Write in the Greenhouse: Poems. Rockland, ME: Front Porch Editions, 2011. Print. ISBN 0-8050-6727-2, ISBN 978-1892266132.
- Native Moons, Native Days: Poems. Greenfield Center, NY: Bowman, 2012. Print. ISBN 0-8050-6727-2, ISBN 978-1105254543

Individual Publications

- All sorts, Amtrak Dawn: Seattle to Vancouver, BC.
- Nocturne, and: After Your Divorce.
