= Susan Garriock =

Medal record

Women's canoe slalom

Representing Great Britain

World Championships
Silver medal – second place	1983 Meran	K-1 team

Susan Garriock is a former British slalom canoeist who competed in the 1980s. She won a silver medal in the K-1 team event at the 1983 ICF Canoe Slalom World Championships in Meran.
