= Barbara Sattler-Kovacevic =

Austrian canoeist (born 1948)

Barbara Sattler-Kovacevic (born 19 July 1948) is an Austrian retired slalom canoeist who competed from the late 1960s to the late 1970s. She finished 18th in the K-1 event at the 1972 Summer Olympics in Munich.
