= Ulla Steinle =

West German slalom canoeist

Medal record

Women's canoe slalom

Representing West Germany

World Championships
Gold medal – first place	1987 Bourg St.-Maurice	K-1 team
Silver medal – second place	1985 Augsburg	K-1 team

Ulla Steinle is a former West German slalom canoeist who competed in the 1980s.

She won two medals in the K-1 team event at the ICF Canoe Slalom World Championships with a gold in 1987 and a silver in 1985.

At the canoe slalom world championships in 1985 in the Augsburg Eiskanal, she won the silver medal in the team competition with Margit Messelhäuser (Augsburg Kayak Club) and Gabi Schmid (Kauna Schwaben Augsburg).
