= Ursula Gläser =

German canoeist

Personal information
- Nationality: German
- Born: East Germany

Sport
- Sport: Canoeing
- Events: Canoe slalom; Wildwater canoeing
Medal record
Representing East Germany
World Championships
Gold medal – first place	1959 Geneva	Folding K-1 team
Gold medal – first place	1963 Spittal	Folding K-1 team
Gold medal – first place	1965 Spittal	K-1
Gold medal – first place	1965 Spittal	K-1 team
Silver medal – second place	1963 Spittal	Folding K-1

Ursula Gläser is a retired slalom canoeist who competed for East Germany in the 1950s and 1960s. She won four gold medals at the ICF Canoe Slalom World Championships (K-1: 1965, K-1 team: 1965, Folding K-1 team: 1959, 1963) and a silver (Folding K-1: 1963).
