= Thomas S. Kupper =

American physician

Thomas S. Kupper is an American physician, academic, and clinician. His work with clinical and research experience spans dermatology, cutaneous oncology, and immunology. He is the Thomas B. Fitzpatrick Professor at Harvard Medical School, and chairs the Departments of Dermatology at Brigham and Women's Hospital. He also leads the Cutaneous Oncology Disease Center at the Dana Farber Cancer Institute.

== Education ==
Thomas Seth Kupper obtained his BA in chemistry from UCLA. He received his MD from the Yale School of Medicine in 1981. From Yale-New Haven Hospital, he completed a residency in General Surgery, followed by postdoctoral research in Immunology, and a residency in Dermatology. He obtained Board Certification in Dermatology in 1989.

== Career ==
Kupper began his career as assistant professor of dermatology at Yale School of Medicine, then became associate professor of Medicine and Pathology at Washington University School of Medicine. He was recruited to Harvard Medical School as the Thomas B. Fitzpatrick Associate Professor of Dermatology. He became full Professor and Division Chief of Dermatology in 1995 and led the transition of Dermatology from Division of Medicine to freestanding independent hospital department in 2001.

== Research ==
After discovering and describing keratinocyte cytokines in late 1980s/early 1990s, he has spent the past two decades years focusing on skin homing T cells, from reporting the molecular structure of Cutaneous Lymphocyte Antigen to co-discovering that non-inflamed skin contained large numbers of memory T cells. A subset of these are now known as “tissue resident memory T cells” or TRM, and he demonstrated that these T cells 1) can be generated by skin vaccination, 2) provide immune protection in the absence of circulating T cells, 3) have a diverse T cell repertoire mirrored by circulating memory T cells, and 4) utilize unique metabolic strategies to survive in the periphery, and represent a prognostic factor in melanoma. In the diagnosis and treatment of Cutaneous T Cell Lymphoma, which he defined as a malignancy of skin resident and circulating T cells. This observation has led to mechanism-based therapies, more precise diagnosis and prognosis. Over the years this work has been supported by a MERIT award from the NIAID, a Transformative R01 Award from the Office of the NIH Director, and multiple R01's from the NIAID, NIAMS, and NCI.

== Awards and honors ==
He was elected as Fellow of the American Association of Academic Scientists and member of the American Academy of Physicians in 2008. He was elected as a member of the American Society for Clinical Investigation. He won the American Skin Association Autoimmune and Inflammatory Skin Disorders Research Achievement Award in 2014. He is an honorary fellow of the Japanese Society for Investigative Dermatology, the Korean Society for Investigative Dermatology, the Swiss Dermatologic Association, and the Austrian Society for Investigative Dermatology.

== Publications ==
- The vast majority of CLA+ T cells are fellow resident in normal skin.
- Skin infection generates non-migratory memory CD8+ T(RM) cells providing global skin immunity.
- Dependence of skin TRM on exogenous lipids.
- Identification of T cells influencing melanoma prognosis.
- The emerging role of resident memory T cells in protective immunity and inflammatory disease.
