= 2024 ICF Masters Canoe Slalom World Championships =

The 2024 ICF Masters Canoe Slalom World Championships took place from 24 to 25 August 2024 in Krakow, Poland under the auspices of International Canoe Federation (ICF).

== Medal summary ==
=== Men ===
==== Canoe ====
| Event | Gold | | Silver | | Bronze | |
|---|---|---|---|---|---|---|
| C1 | Oliver Weist (GER) | 88.68 | Etienne Daille (FRA) | 88.75 | Mariusz Wieczorek (POL) | 91.95 |
| C1 team | | | | | | |

==== Kayak ====
| Event | Gold | | Silver | | Bronze | |
|---|---|---|---|---|---|---|
| K1 | Etienne Daille (FRA) | 82.25 | Pierre-Marie Roussel (FRA) | 86.29 | Damien Ganthier (FRA) | 89.38 |
| K1 team | | | | | | |
| Extreme | | | | | | |

=== Women ===
==== Canoe ====
| Event | Gold | | Silver | | Bronze | |
|---|---|---|---|---|---|---|
| C1 | Carole Bouzidi (ALG) | 98.33 | Caroline Loir (FRA) | 110.42 | Kate Kent (GBR) | 118.63 |
| C1 team | | | | | | |

==== Kayak ====
| Event | Gold | | Silver | | Bronze | |
|---|---|---|---|---|---|---|
| K1 | Carole Bouzidi (ALG) | 86.74 | Natalia Pacierpnik (POL) | 87.12 | Caroline Loir (FRA) | 99.11 |
| K1 team | | | | | | |
| Extreme | | | | | | |
