= Hohenlimburg =

Hohenlimburg may refer to:

- Hagen-Hohenlimburg, formerly known as Limburg an der Lenne, a present-day borough of the city of Hagen, Germany
- Limburg-Hohenlimburg, a county in medieval Germany
