= Cornelia Bachofner =

Swiss slalom canoeist

Medal record

Women's canoe slalom

Representing Switzerland

World Championships
Gold medal – first place	1975 Skopje	K-1 team

Cornelia Bachofner is a Swiss former slalom canoeist who competed in the 1970s.

She won a gold medal in the K-1 team event at the 1975 ICF Canoe Slalom World Championships in Skopje.
