= Alfred Baum (composer) =

Swiss musician (1904–1993)

Alfred Baum (23 September 1904 in Zurich – 30 September 1993 in Dietlikon) was a Swiss composer, pianist, and organist.

== Works ==
- Concerto for trumpet, piano, timpani and strings (1959/60)
