= Anneliese Seidel =

Sport
- Sport: Kayaking
- Event: Folding kayak
Medal record
Women's canoe slalom
Representing East Germany
World Championships
Bronze medal – third place	1957 Augsburg	Folding K-1

Anneliese Seidel is a retired East German slalom canoeist who competed in the late 1950s. She won a bronze medal in the folding K-1 event at the 1957 ICF Canoe Slalom World Championships in Augsburg.
