= 1983 ICF Canoe Slalom World Championships =

Canoe slalom event in Meran, Italy

The 1983 ICF Canoe Slalom World Championships were held in Meran, Italy under the auspices of International Canoe Federation for a record-tying third time, matching the record set by Spittal, Austria (1963, 1965, 1977). It was the 18th edition. Meran hosted the event previously in 1953 and 1971. The mixed C2 event was discontinued and the program remained unchanged until the 2009 Championships.

== Medal summary ==
=== Men's ===
==== Canoe ====
Event	Gold	Points	Silver	Points	Bronze	Points
C1	Jon Lugbill (USA)	221.94	David Hearn (USA)	222.87	Jože Vidmar (YUG)	234.27
C1 team	United States; Jon Lugbill; David Hearn; Kent Ford	249.41	Czechoslovakia; Juraj Ontko; Jozef Hajdučík; Karel Ťoupalík	276.16	United Kingdom; Martyn Hedges; Peter Keane; Jeremy Taylor	276.63
C2	United States; Lecky Haller; Fritz Haller	246.33	France; Pierre Calori; Jacques Calori	248.05	United States; Steve Garvis; Mike Garvis	256.61
C2 team	Czechoslovakia; Miroslav Hajdučík & Milan Kučera; Dušan Zaťko & Ľudovít Tkáč; František Slavík & Jiří Decastelo	288.57	United States; Lecky Haller & Fritz Haller; Steve Garvis & Mike Garvis; Charles Harris & John Harris	295.50	United Kingdom; Eric Jamieson & Robin Williams; Michael Smith & Andrew Smith; Robert Joce & Robert Owen	298.20

==== Kayak ====
Event	Gold	Points	Silver	Points	Bronze	Points
K1	Richard Fox (GBR)	207.18	Toni Prijon (FRG)	211.32	Peter Micheler (FRG)	212.37
K1 team	United Kingdom; Richard Fox; Paul McConkey; Jim Dolan	232.24	West Germany; Toni Prijon; Peter Micheler; Dirk Bovensmann	235.16	Czechoslovakia; Luboš Hilgert; Ivan Hilgert; Jiří Měchura	238.01

=== Women's ===
==== Kayak ====
Event	Gold	Points	Silver	Points	Bronze	Points
K1	Elizabeth Sharman (GBR)	232.34	Jane Roderick (GBR)	236.34	Marie-Françoise Grange (FRA)	238.75
K1 team	France; Marie-Françoise Grange; Sylvie Arnaud; Myriam Jerusalmi	270.76	United Kingdom; Elizabeth Sharman; Jane Roderick; Susan Garriock	285.51	Czechoslovakia; Marcela Košťálová; Eva Stavařová; Marcela Kubričanová	287.41

== Medals table ==
Rank	Nation	Gold	Silver	Bronze	Total
1	Great Britain (GBR)	3	2	2	7
2	United States (USA)	3	2	1	6
3	Czechoslovakia (TCH)	1	1	2	4
4	France (FRA)	1	1	1	3
5	West Germany (FRG)	0	2	1	3
6	Yugoslavia (YUG)	0	0	1	1
Totals (6 entries)		8	8	8	24
