= Anneliese Bläsing =

German politician (1923–1996)

Anneliese Bläsing (2 June 1923 – 31 January 1996) was a German politician. A member of the Nazi Party (NSDAP) at the age of 17 until the end of World War II, she later became a founding member of the NPD and was the national women's officer of the party. From 1953 to 1957 she was a secretary in the German Bundestag and from 1 December 1966 to 30 November 1970 she was a member of the Landtag of Hesse.
