= Jochen Küpper =

German chemist and physicist (born 1971)

- Born: Jochen Küpper; 1971 (age 54–55); Langenfeld, Rhineland, Germany
- Citizenship: German
- Education: Heinrich Heine University, Düsseldorf, Germany (Dipl. Chem.), Heinrich Heine University, Düsseldorf, Germany (Dr. rer. nat.), Free University of Berlin, Germany (Dr. rer. nat. habil.)
- Scientific career
- Fields: Physics (molecular physics)
- Workplaces: Center for Free-Electron Laser Science (2010–); DESY (2010–); University of Hamburg (2010–); Fritz Haber Institute of the MPG (2003–2010); FOM Institute for Plasma Physics "Rijnhuizen" (2002–2003); University of North Carolina at Chapel Hill (2001–2002); Heinrich Heine University, Düsseldorf, Germany (1996–2000)
- Doctoral advisor: Michael Schmitt & Karl Kleinermanns
- Other academic advisors: Gerard Meijer

Jochen Küpper FRSC (born 1971) is a German chemist and physicist, group leader at the Center for Free-Electron Laser Science, Deutsches Elektronen-Synchrotron DESY, and Professor of Physics and Professor by courtesy of Chemistry at the University of Hamburg, Germany.

Küpper is best known for his pioneering work on the control of complex neutral molecules, including the spatial separation of structural isomers and their laser-alignment and mixed-field orientation. He develops novel techniques to control the external and internal degrees of freedom of neutral molecules and exploits these well-defined samples in experiments to image their nuclear and electronic structure and dynamics.

== Education and career ==
Küpper went to Lise-Meitner-Gymnasium in Leverkusen, Germany. From 1991 to 1996, he studied Chemistry at Heinrich Heine University, Düsseldorf, and University of Pittsburgh in Pittsburgh, Pennsylvania. In 2000, he received his doctorate in Physical Chemistry from Heinrich Heine University. In 2009, he received the habilitation in experimental physics for his work on the control of large, neutral molecules at Free University Berlin.

He was Feodor-Lynen Fellow of the Alexander von Humboldt Society at the University of North Carolina in Chapel Hill, North Carolina, from 2001 to 2002, and at the FOM-Institute for Plasma Physics "Rijnhuizen" in Nieuwegein, The Netherlands. He then became project leader in the Department of molecular physics at the Fritz Haber Institute of the Max Planck Society in Berlin-Dahlem, Germany.

Since 2010, he is a professor of physics at University of Hamburg, and a research group leader at the Center for Free-Electron Laser Science and DESY in Hamburg, and since 2015, he is also a professor by courtesy of chemistry at the University of Hamburg.

== Honors and awards ==
Küpper has received several awards, including the prestigious Nernst Haber Bodenstein Prize of the German Bunsen-Society for Physical Chemistry in 2009, and an ERC Consolidator Grant in 2013. He was elected as fellow of the Royal Society of Chemistry in 2014. He was also awarded the following prizes throughout the years:

- Kandarpa Narahari Rao Prize (2000)
- Feodor Lynen Fellowship of the Alexander von Humboldt Foundation (2001)
- Nernst Haber Bodenstein Prize of the German Bunsen-Society for Physical Chemistry (2009)

== Works ==
- Chang, Yuan-Pin; Horke, Daniel A.; Trippel, Sebastian; Küpper, Jochen (2 October 2015). "Spatially-controlled complex molecules and their applications". International Reviews in Physical Chemistry. 34 (4). Informa UK Limited: 557–590. arXiv:1505.05632. doi:10.1080/0144235x.2015.1077838. ISSN 0144-235X. S2CID 54637532.
- Trippel, Sebastian; Mullins, Terry; Müller, Nele L. M.; Kienitz, Jens S.; González-Férez, Rosario; Küpper, Jochen (10 March 2015). "Two-State Wave Packet for Strong Field-Free Molecular Orientation". Physical Review Letters. 114 (10) 103003. arXiv:1409.2836. Bibcode:2015PhRvL.114j3003T. doi:10.1103/physrevlett.114.103003. ISSN 0031-9007. PMID 25815928. S2CID 17364530.
- Chang, Yuan-Pin; Długołęcki, Karol; Küpper, Jochen; Rösch, Daniel; Wild, Dieter; Willitsch, Stefan (4 October 2013). "Specific Chemical Reactivities of Spatially Separated 3-Aminophenol Conformers with Cold Ca + Ions". Science. 342 (6154): 98–101. arXiv:1308.6538. Bibcode:2013Sci...342...98C. doi:10.1126/science.1242271. ISSN 0036-8075. PMID 24092740. S2CID 2039544.
- Küpper, Jochen; Stern, Stephan; Holmegaard, Lotte; Filsinger, Frank; Rouzée, Arnaud; Rudenko, Artem; Johnsson, Per; Martin, Andrew V.; Adolph, Marcus; Aquila, Andrew; Bajt, Saša; Barty, Anton; Bostedt, Christoph; Bozek, John; Caleman, Carl; Coffee, Ryan; Coppola, Nicola; Delmas, Tjark; Epp, Sascha; Erk, Benjamin; Foucar, Lutz; Gorkhover, Tais; Gumprecht, Lars; Hartmann, Andreas; Hartmann, Robert; Hauser, Günter; Holl, Peter; Hömke, Andre; Kimmel, Nils; Krasniqi, Faton; Kühnel, Kai-Uwe; Maurer, Jochen; Messerschmidt, Marc; Moshammer, Robert; Reich, Christian; Rudek, Benedikt; Santra, Robin; Schlichting, Ilme; Schmidt, Carlo; Schorb, Sebastian; Schulz, Joachim; Soltau, Heike; Spence, John C. H.; Starodub, Dmitri; Strüder, Lothar; Thøgersen, Jan; Vrakking, Marc J. J.; Weidenspointner, Georg; White, Thomas A.; Wunderer, Cornelia; Meijer, Gerard; Ullrich, Joachim; Stapelfeldt, Henrik; Rolles, Daniel; Chapman, Henry N. (28 February 2014). "X-Ray Diffraction from Isolated and Strongly Aligned Gas-Phase Molecules with a Free-Electron Laser". Physical Review Letters. 112 (8) 083002. arXiv:1307.4577. Bibcode:2014PhRvL.112h3002K. doi:10.1103/physrevlett.112.083002. ISSN 0031-9007. S2CID 23637129.
- Holmegaard, Lotte; Nielsen, Jens H.; Nevo, Iftach; Stapelfeldt, Henrik; Filsinger, Frank; Küpper, Jochen; Meijer, Gerard (12 January 2009). "Laser-Induced Alignment and Orientation of Quantum-State-Selected Large Molecules". Physical Review Letters. 102 (2) 023001. arXiv:0810.2307. Bibcode:2009PhRvL.102b3001H. doi:10.1103/physrevlett.102.023001. ISSN 0031-9007. PMID 19257266. S2CID 15948940.
- Filsinger, Frank; Erlekam, Undine; von Helden, Gert; Küpper, Jochen; Meijer, Gerard (2 April 2008). "Selector for Structural Isomers of Neutral Molecules". Physical Review Letters. 100 (13) 133003. arXiv:0802.2795. Bibcode:2008PhRvL.100m3003F. doi:10.1103/physrevlett.100.133003. ISSN 0031-9007. PMID 18517944. S2CID 9024605.
- Korter, Timothy M.; Pratt, David W.; Küpper, Jochen (25 August 1998). "Indole−H2O in the Gas Phase. Structures, Barriers to Internal Motion, and S1 ← S0 Transition Moment Orientation. Solvent Reorganization in the Electronically Excited State". The Journal of Physical Chemistry A. 102 (37). American Chemical Society (ACS): 7211–7216. doi:10.1021/jp982456x. ISSN 1089-5639.

He has authored more than 120 scientific articles; see also full publication list.
