= Anneliese Hitzenberger =

Austrian physician

- Born: 30 March 1905; Vienna, Austro-Hungarian Empire
- Died: 31 July 2003 (aged 98); Vienna, Austria
- Education: University of Vienna (M.D.)
- Scientific career
- Fields: Medicine
- Workplaces: Vienna General Hospital

Anneliese Hitzenberger (30 March 1905 – 31 July 2003) was an Austrian physician.

== Early life and education ==
Anna Elisabeth Kosak was born in Vienna, capital of the Austro-Hungarian Empire, on 30 March 1905. Her family moved to Bregenz when World War I started in 1914 and she attended the local gymnasium there. Hitzenberger wanted to study medicine despite her parents' preference for acting or writing, so they compromised on philology and history in her first year of university. Unhappy, she chose to pretend to take more of the same for her second year, but secretly took medical classes, much to her parents' displeasure. She ultimately was awarded her M.D. degree by the University of Vienna in 1931.

== Career ==
She married the head of her department, Karl Hitzenberger, in 1928 and they had four children together. After graduation she worked in the Vienna General Hospital until she contracted tubercular pleurisy during her third pregnancy and had to stop working in 1933. Her husband died in 1941 and she had take over his medical practice to support her family. She was only able to do so because many male doctors had been mobilized during World War II. Hitzenberger became politically active after the war and was vice-president of the Association of Austrian Medical Women for many years before she became president in 1974. She was also a member of the Medical Women's International Association and edited the Vienna Medical Journal.
