= 1971 ICF Canoe Slalom World Championships =

Canoe slalom event in Meran, Italy

The 1971 ICF Canoe Slalom World Championships were held in Meran, Italy under the auspices of International Canoe Federation for the second time. It was the 12th edition. The mixed C2 team event was discontinued following the 1969 championships. Meran hosted the championships previously in 1953, tying a record set by Geneva, Switzerland (1949, 1959) but Spittal, Austria has hosted the event 3 times (1963, 1965.and 1977.)

== Medal summary ==
=== Men's ===
==== Canoe ====
Event	Gold	Points	Silver	Points	Bronze	Points
C1	Reinhold Kauder (FRG)	293.76	Wulf Reinicke (GDR)	305.49	Petr Sodomka (TCH)	313.23
C1 team	East Germany; Jürgen Köhler; Wulf Reinicke; Jochen Förster	410.19	West Germany; Wolfgang Peters; Harald Cuypers; Reinhold Kauder	423.81	Czechoslovakia; Zbyněk Puleč; Karel Třešňák; Petr Sodomka	500.90
C2	East Germany; Klaus Trummer; Jürgen Kretschmer	268.68	East Germany; Rolf-Dieter Amend; Walter Hofmann	282.50	East Germany; Uwe Franz; Ulrich Opelt	284.76
C2 team	East Germany; Rolf-Dieter Amend & Walter Hofmann; Klaus Trummer & Jürgen Kretschmer; Uwe Franz & Ulrich Opelt	403.78	West Germany; Karl-Heinz Scheffer & Heinz-Jürgen Steinschulte; Manfred Heß & Wolfgang Wenzel; Hans Jakob Hitz & Theo Nüsing	493.70	Czechoslovakia; Ladislav Měšťan & Zdeněk Měšťan; Antonín Brabec & František Kadaňka; Milan Horyna & Gabriel Janoušek	499.06

==== Kayak ====
Event	Gold	Points	Silver	Points	Bronze	Points
K1	Siegbert Horn (GDR)	241.40	Christian Döring (GDR)	251.17	Ulrich Peters (FRG)	252.67
K1 team	Austria; Kurt Presslmayr; Norbert Sattler; Hans Schlecht	302.83	East Germany; Jürgen Bremer; Siegbert Horn; Christian Döring	329.87	West Germany; Jürgen Gerlach; Alfred Baum; Ulrich Peters	337.05

=== Mixed ===
==== Canoe ====
Event	Gold	Points	Silver	Points	Bronze	Points
C2	Czechoslovakia; Hana Koudelová; Jiří Koudela	342.14	Czechoslovakia; Jitka Legatová; Milan Svoboda	355.41	Czechoslovakia; Ludmilla Sirotková; Jiří Krejza	399.36

=== Women's ===
==== Kayak ====
Event	Gold	Points	Silver	Points	Bronze	Points
K1	Angelika Bahmann (GDR)	347.30	Ludmila Polesná (TCH)	367.18	Veronika Stampe (GDR)	370.10
K1 team	East Germany; Angelika Bahmann; Veronika Stampe; Dagmar Kriste	520.13	West Germany; Ursula Heinrich; Ulrike Deppe; Bärbel Körner	603.82	Czechoslovakia; Bohumila Kapplová; Ludmila Polesná; Irena Komancová	736.02

== Medals table ==
Rank	Nation	Gold	Silver	Bronze	Total
1	East Germany (GDR)	6	4	2	12
2	West Germany (FRG)	1	3	2	6
3	Czechoslovakia (TCH)	1	2	5	8
4	Austria (AUT)	1	0	0	1
Totals (4 entries)		9	9	9	27
