= Steinle Turret Machine Company =

- U.S. National Register of Historic Places
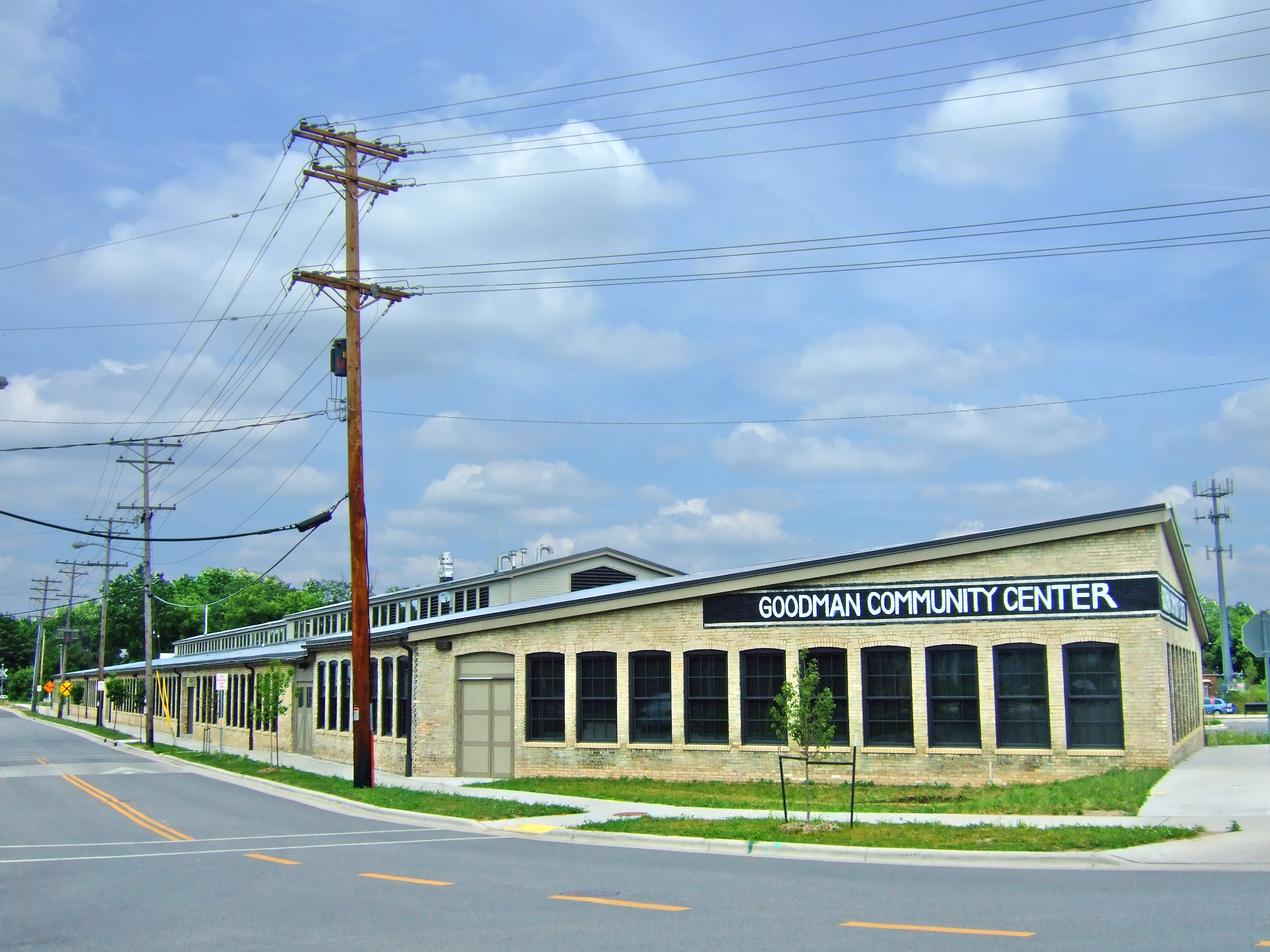
- Steinle Turret Machine Company
- Location: 149 Waubesa St. Madison, Wisconsin
- Coordinates: 43.09683°N 89.34372°W
- Built: 1903
- NRHP reference No.: 07001272
- Added to NRHP: December 13, 2007

The Steinle Turret Machine Company, now the Goodman Community Center, is a former farm equipment factory begun in 1903 in Madison, Wisconsin, United States, which has been converted to a community center. The building was added to the National Register of Historic Places in 2007 as a good example of the production shed type of factory.

Madison grew slowly from its founding in 1836 until 1848, when it was chosen as the state capital and the site of the University of Wisconsin. Then it grew rapidly, but the main enterprises remained government and education for decades. Then in the 1880s manufacturing of farm equipment began to take hold with the establishment of Fuller and Johnson, Madison Plow Company, Mendota Agricultural Works, and the McCormick Harvesting Machine Company. In 1885 the Gisholt Machine Tools Company also started, producing machines like turret lathes for making other machines - a new manufacturing sector. Madison's diversification of manufacturing continued in the following years, branching into batteries, meat processing, hospital equipment, and other products.

Madison's early growth was around the Capitol, but much of the manufacturing growth ended up on the east side. In 1901 the East Side Land Company platted a 45-acre parcel which would contain the Steinle factory, naming it the Fair Oaks plat. The land company recruited manufacturers so that there would be jobs nearby so they could sell residential lots. In 1903 they used a free lot to persuade the Mason-Kipp Company, which manufactured machine lubricators, to move to Fair Oaks. Other factories joined, lots sold, and in 1906 Fair Oaks incorporated as a village. By 1910 it had a population of 1000 and four factories: Madison Plow Company, Mason-Kipp, Steinle Turret, and the U.S. Sugar Company, which processed sugar beets. In 1913, Fair Oaks was annexed by the city of Madison.

The American Shredder Company was founded in 1903, directed by J.J. Power, J.C. Harper, and John Aylward, who was also a director of the East Side Land Company. American Shredder's aim was to manufacture "corn self-feeders, corn huskers, and other machinery and supplies." The company bought an industrial lot in the Fair Oaks development near both the Chicago and North Western Railway track and the Chicago, Milwaukee and St Paul Railroad, and in 1903 built the first section of the building that is the subject of this article. That initial building was wood-framed, with walls of load-bearing brick, about 180 feet long by 80 feet wide. It had a monitor roof, which provided ventilation, light, and space for the cranes which moved heavy objects around the factory. This was the production shed type of factory which had appeared about 1900, succeeding the earlier textile mill type of factory building of earlier years. Evidently American Shredder's business was not good, because it leased out the plant in 1906, after only three years.

Steinle Turrent Machine Company was the next occupant. George Steinle was a son of German immigrants, born in Madison in 1865. He had worked as a telegraph operator, a mail carrier, and then a designer of machine tools for Ball Brothers Foundry. After that he was a representative for Gisholt Machine Tools for 14 years. Gisholt made turret lathes for cutting metal machine parts, among other tools. In 1906 Steinle broke off to form his own competing company which would manufacture a "full swing" turret lathe he had designed himself. Steinle's company succeeded, buying the factory from American Shredder in 1909, and enlarging it a bit on the north end in 1911. By 1913 the company employed 100. In 1916 to 1917, Steinle extended the factory floor to the south, including the monitor roof. During World War I Steinle manufactured military supplies - using his turret lathes to manufacture five-inch naval guns in a separate 600-man factory on Atwood Avenue. Minor additions to the factory at 149 Waubesa occurred in 1917-1918 and 1920. Steinle's company prospered into the early 1930s.

Theodore Kupfer Iron Works bought the factory in 1940, after a fire damaged their factory on East Mifflin. Theodore Kupfer, like George Steinle, had worked at the Ball Foundry, then started his company in 1894 on East Mifflin to manufacture "feed cookers and steamers, sugar kettles, cauldrons, and ornamental ironwork." After World War I they shifted to fabricating structural steel. Around 1942 Kupfer began producing 30-foot-long mounting bases for submarine engines. Around the same time, Kupfer replaced some of the factory's timber framework with steel, probably widened the clerestory upper story in the 1916 building, and added the gantry on the east side of the building for loading submarine engine skeletons onto railcars which hauled them to engine-builder Fairbanks Morse Company in Beloit. During World War II, Kupfer also produced gun mounts and steel girders. After the war, Kupfer fabricated steel for buildings and bridges, including in Madison the pedestrian bridge at Tenney Park, the Dane County Colliseum, and buildings on the UW campus. As custom-fabricated steel was replaced by prefabricated steel Kupfer's business declined, and its iron works closed in 1985.

Durline Scales and Manufacturing bought the Steinle Building in 1990 and manufactured large truck scales there until 2003. Ironworks Development LLC bought the building. It transferred to the Atwood Community Center in 2005. The site underwent transformations to become a community center in 2007 - eventually called the Goodman Center's Ironworks Building.

In 2007 the original structure was placed on the National Register of Historic Places, considered significant as one of a few one-story production shed-type factories remaining in Dane County.
