= Lipno nad Vltavou =

- Municipality
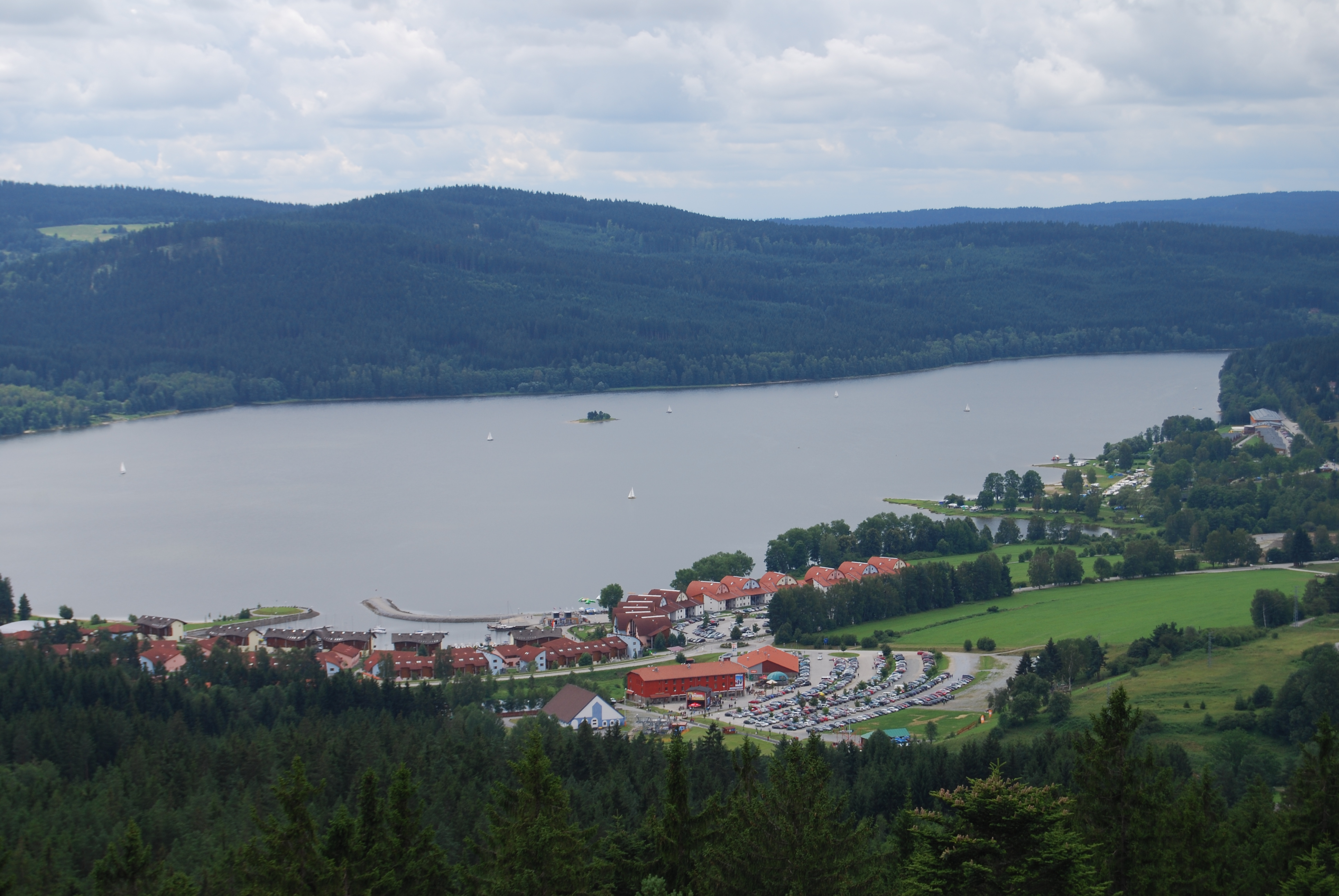
- Lipno nad Vltavou on the shore of the Lipno Reservoir

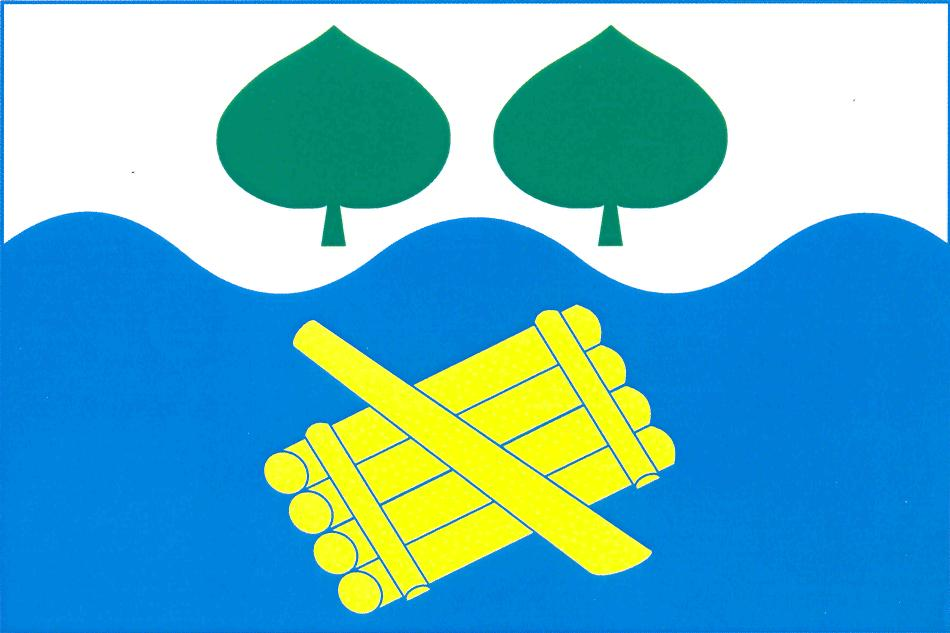
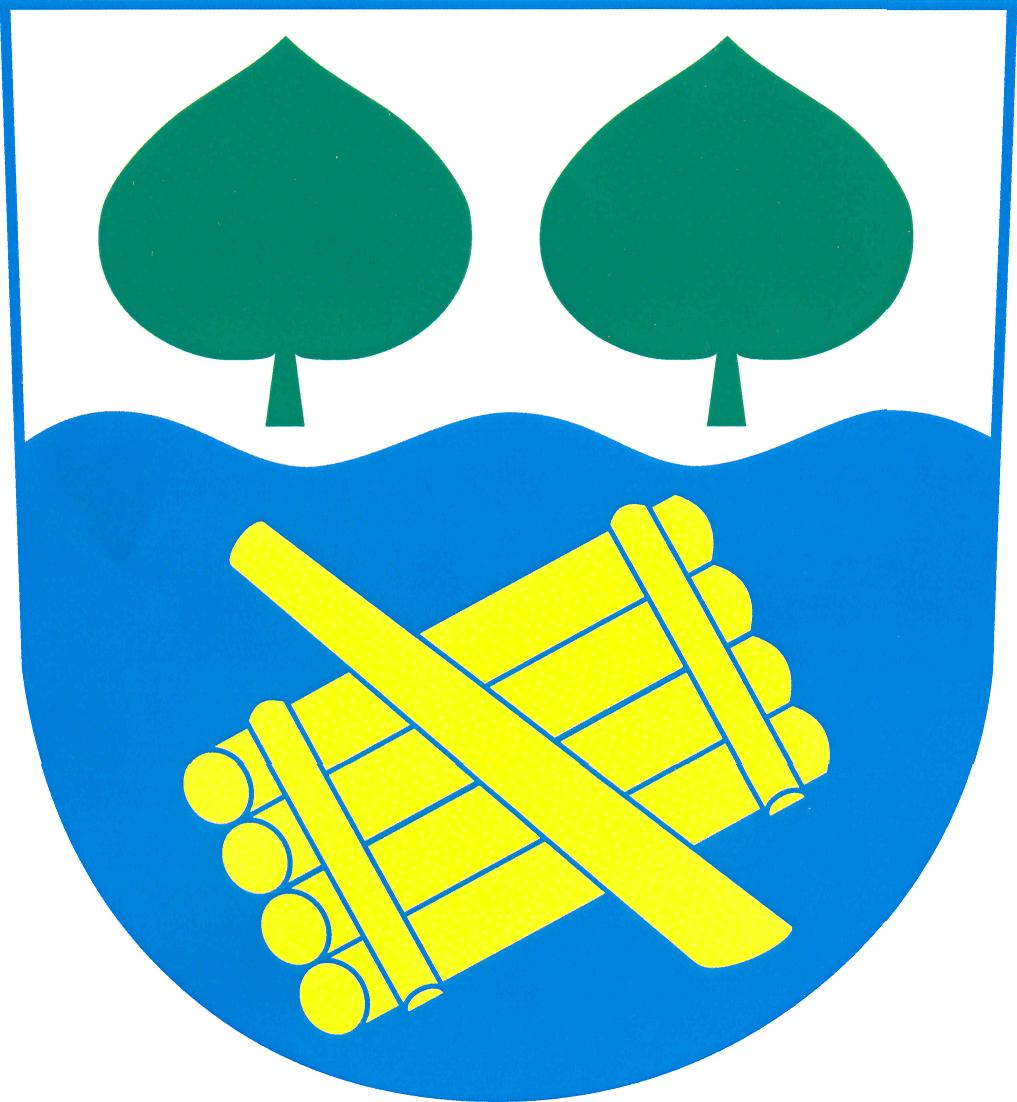
- Flag Coat of arms

- Location in the Czech Republic
- Coordinates: 48°38′22″N 14°13′46″E
- Country: Czech Republic
- Region: South Bohemian
- District: Český Krumlov
- First mentioned: 1530

Area
  - Total: 19.48 km^{2} (7.52 sq mi)
- Elevation: 776 m (2,546 ft)

Population (2026-01-01)
  - Total: 668
  - Density: 34.3/km^{2} (88.8/sq mi)
- Time zone: UTC+1 (CET)
  - Summer (DST): UTC+2 (CEST)
- Postal code: 382 78
- Website: www.lipnonadvltavou.cz

Lipno nad Vltavou (German: Lippen) is a municipality and village in Český Krumlov District in the South Bohemian Region of the Czech Republic. It has about 700 inhabitants. It is a popular summer resort.

== Administrative division ==
Lipno nad Vltavou consists of two municipal parts (in brackets population according to the 2021 census):

- Lipno nad Vltavou (584)
- Slupečná (50)

== Etymology ==
In the oldest documents, the name was written in the masculine gender as Lipen, but later the neuter gender Lipno prevailed. The name is derived from the Czech word lípa ('linden') and the Old Czech adjective lipný.

== Geography ==
Lipno nad Vltavou is located about 20 kilometres (12 mi) south of Český Krumlov and 40 km (25 mi) southwest of České Budějovice. It lies in the Bohemian Forest mountain range. The highest point is the mountain Kaliště at 993 m (3,258 ft) above sea level. The municipality is situated on the shore of the Lipno Reservoir, which is built on the Vltava River.

== History ==
The first written mention of Lipno nad Vltavou is from 1530. It was originally a small lumbering settlement belonging to the Vyšší Brod estate. During the construction of the Lipno Reservoir between 1952 and 1959, the settlement was flooded and a new resort was built instead.

== Demographics ==
Historical population

| Year | Pop. | ±% |
|---|---|---|
| 1869 | 550 | — |
| 1880 | 558 | +1.5% |
| 1890 | 553 | −0.9% |
| 1900 | 549 | −0.7% |
| 1910 | 575 | +4.7% |

| Year | Pop. | ±% |
|---|---|---|
| 1921 | 532 | −7.5% |
| 1930 | 620 | +16.5% |
| 1950 | 170 | −72.6% |
| 1961 | 498 | +192.9% |
| 1970 | 584 | +17.3% |

| Year | Pop. | ±% |
|---|---|---|
| 1980 | 488 | −16.4% |
| 1991 | 475 | −2.7% |
| 2001 | 550 | +15.8% |
| 2011 | 679 | +23.5% |
| 2021 | 634 | −6.6% |

Source: Censuses

== Economy ==
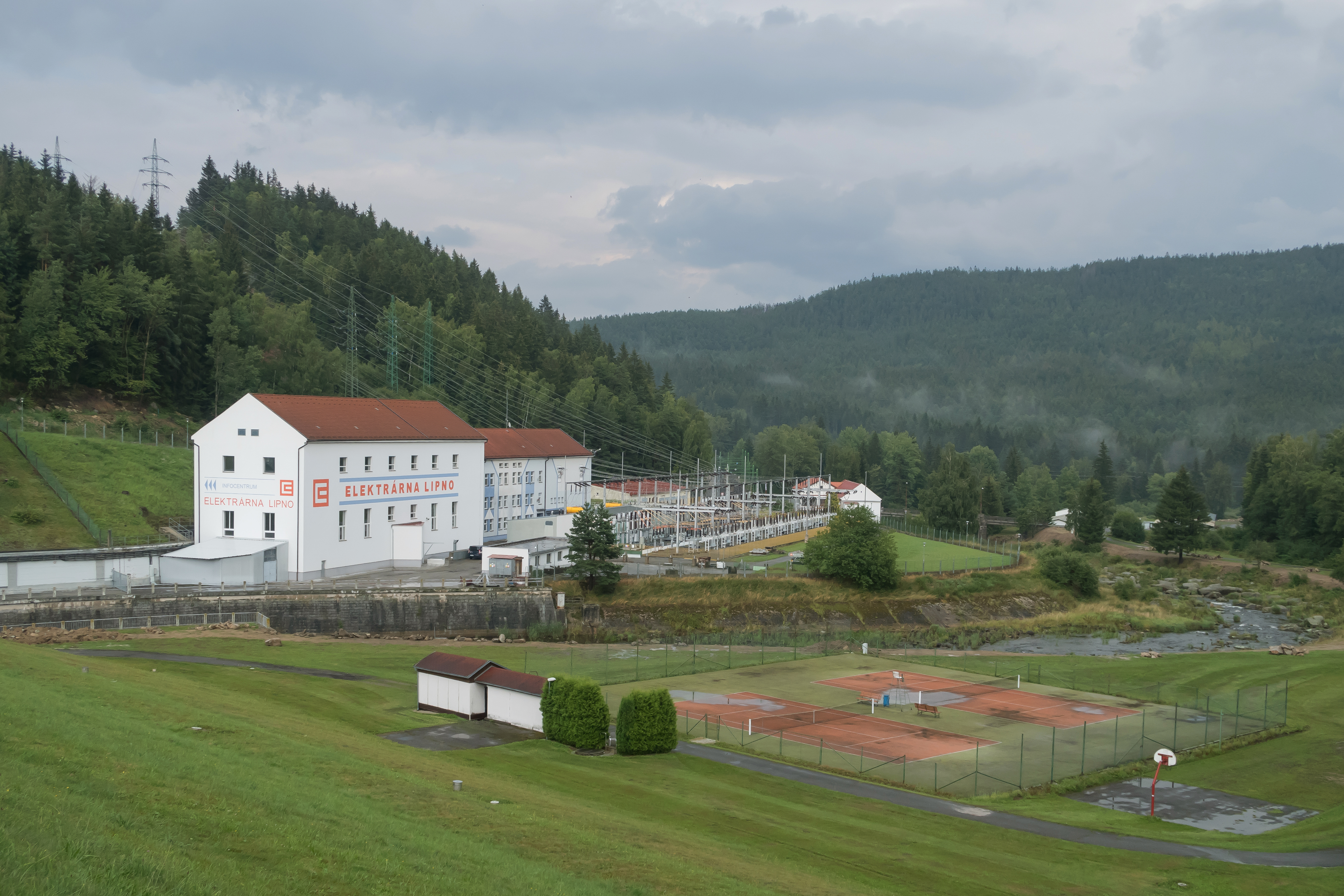
Lipno Hydroelectric Power Station

Thanks to its location by the Lipno Reservoir, Lipno nad Vltavou is one of the most popular tourist and recreational places in the country. Lipno Reservoir is used for recreation, water sports, and fish farming. The Lipno Hydroelectric Power Station has been in operation since 1959 and has nameplate capacity 2x60 MW.

== Transport ==
Lipno nad Vltavou is a starting point of a short railway line of local importance heading to Rybník.

== Sport ==
Lipno nad Vltavou hosted the 1967 ICF Canoe Slalom World Championships.

== Sights ==
Treetop Walkway in Lipno nad Vltavou is among the most visited tourist destinations in the South Bohemian Region. It is an educational trail with an observation tower and toboggans.
