= ICF Canoe Slalom World Championships =

International event in canoeing

- Genre: Canoeing
- Frequency: Annual, except for Olympic years
- Location: Varies (see Host cities in prose)
- Inaugurated: 1949 Geneva
- Previous event: 2026 Oklahoma City
- Next event: 2027 La Seu d'Urgell
- Participants: Men and women
- Organiser: International Canoe Federation

The ICF Canoe Slalom World Championships are an international event in canoeing organized by the International Canoe Federation. The World Championships have taken place every year in non-Summer Olympic years since 2002. From 1949 to 1999, they had taken place in odd-numbered years. The 2001 championships were scheduled to take place in Ducktown, Tennessee (East of Chattanooga) from 20 to 23 September, but were canceled in the wake of the September 11 attacks.

Men race in single kayaks (K1) and single canoes (C1) both individually and in teams. Women race in K1 both individually and in teams and since the 2010 championships also in C1 individually. A team event was scheduled for those championships, but it was canceled because of weather conditions. The first women's C1 team event took place at the 2011 world championships, but no medals were awarded. The first medals in this event were awarded in 2013.

The men's C2 event was removed from the World Championships before the 2018 edition. The mixed C2 event was reinstated in 2017 after a 36-year hiatus, but it only lasted until 2019. The kayak cross events for men and women were introduced in 2017 (as extreme kayak).

== Editions ==
#	Year	Host City	Host Country	Events
Biannual
1	1949	Geneva	Switzerland	8
2	1951	Steyr	Austria	8
3	1953	Meran	Italy	8
4	1955	Tacen	Yugoslavia	9
5	1957	Augsburg	West Germany	10
6	1959	Geneva	Switzerland	9
7	1961	Hainsberg	East Germany	8
8	1963	Spittal an der Drau	Austria	9
9	1965	Spittal an der Drau	Austria	10
10	1967	Lipno	Czechoslovakia	9
11	1969	Bourg St.-Maurice	France	10
12	1971	Meran	Italy	9
13	1973	Muotathal	Switzerland	9
14	1975	Skopje	Yugoslavia	9
15	1977	Spittal an der Drau	Austria	9
16	1979	Jonquière, Quebec	Canada	8
17	1981	Bala	United Kingdom	9
18	1983	Meran	Italy	8
19	1985	Augsburg	West Germany	8
20	1987	Bourg St.-Maurice	France	8
21	1989	Savage River, Maryland	USA	8
22	1991	Tacen	Yugoslavia	8
23	1993	Mezzana	Italy	8
24	1995	Nottingham	United Kingdom	8
25	1997	Três Coroas	Brazil	8
26	1999	La Seu d'Urgell	Spain	8
Annual (Except Olympics Years)
27	2002	Bourg St.-Maurice	France	8
28	2003	Augsburg	Germany	8
29	2005	Penrith, New South Wales	Australia	7
30	2006	Prague	Czech Republic	8
31	2007	Foz do Iguaçu	Brazil	8
32	2009	La Seu d'Urgell	Spain	8
33	2010	Tacen	Slovenia	9
34	2011	Bratislava	Slovakia	9
35	2013	Prague	Czech Republic	10
36	2014	Deep Creek Lake, Maryland	USA	9
37	2015	London	United Kingdom	10
38	2017	Pau	France	12
39	2018	Rio de Janeiro	Brazil	11
40	2019	La Seu d'Urgell	Spain	9
40	2019	Prague (Extreme)	Czech Republic	2
41	2021	Bratislava	Slovakia	10
42	2022	Augsburg	Germany	10
43	2023	London	United Kingdom	10
44	2025	Penrith, New South Wales	Australia	12
45	2026	Oklahoma City	USA	12
46	2027	La Seu d'Urgell	Spain	
Total				381

== Lists of medalists ==
- List of ICF Canoe Slalom World Championships medalists in men's canoe
- List of ICF Canoe Slalom World Championships medalists in men's kayak
- List of ICF Canoe Slalom World Championships medalists in mixed canoe
- List of ICF Canoe Slalom World Championships medalists in women's canoe
- List of ICF Canoe Slalom World Championships medalists in women's kayak

== Most successful paddlers ==
Top 10 male and female paddlers with the best medal record including the team events are listed below. Boldface denotes active paddlers and the highest number of medals per type, as of the 2026 championships.

=== Men ===
Rank	Athlete	Country	Event(s)	From	To	Gold	Silver	Bronze	Total
1	**Michal Martikán**	Slovakia	C1, C1 team	1995	2019	**15**	3	5	**23**
2	Jon Lugbill	United States	C1, C1 team	1979	1991	12	1	0	13
3	Alexander Slafkovský	Slovakia	C1, C1 team	2003	2022	10	5	1	16
4	Richard Fox	Great Britain	K1, K1 team	1979	1993	10	0	1	11
5	**Matej Beňuš**	Slovakia	C1, C1 team	2009	2022	9	1	2	12
6	David Hearn	United States	C1, C1 team	1979	1995	8	5	0	13
7	Fabien Lefèvre	France, United States	C1, C2, K1, C2 team, K1 team	2002	2014	7	5	2	14
8	**Joseph Clarke**	Great Britain	K1, KX, KXI, K1 team	2014	2026	7	2	3	12
9	Manfred Merkel	East Germany	C2, Mixed C2, C2 team	1959	1967	7	0	0	7
10	Pavol Hochschorner	Slovakia	C2, C2 team	1999	2014	6	4	4	14
10	Peter Hochschorner	Slovakia	C2, C2 team	1999	2014	6	4	4	14

=== Women ===
Rank	Athlete	Country	Event(s)	From	To	Gold	Silver	Bronze	Total
1	**Jessica Fox**	Australia	C1, K1, KX, C1 team, K1 team	2010	2026	**17**	**5**	3	**25**
2	Myriam Fox-Jerusalmi	France	K1, K1 team	1983	1995	8	2	0	10
3	**Mallory Franklin**	Great Britain	C1, K1, C1 team, K1 team	2013	2023	7	**5**	4	16
4	Štěpánka Hilgertová	Czechoslovakia, Czech Republic	K1, K1 team	1989	2015	7	**5**	2	14
5	**Kimberley Woods**	Great Britain	C1, K1, KX, C1 team, K1 team	2015	2026	6	4	**6**	16
6	Ludmila Polesná	Czechoslovakia	K1, K1 team	1961	1975	4	**5**	2	11
7	Jasmin Schornberg	Germany	K1, K1 team	2006	2022	4	3	4	11
8	**Ricarda Funk**	Germany	K1, K1 team	2015	2025	4	3	2	9
9	Gabriela Satková	Czech Republic	C1, C1 team, K1 team	2018	2025	4	2	1	7
10	Ursula Gläser	East Germany	K1, K1 team	1959	1965	4	1	0	5

== Most successful paddlers in individual events ==
Top 10 male and female paddlers with the best medal record excluding the team events are listed below. Boldface denotes active paddlers and the highest number of medals per type. As of the 2026 championships.

=== Men ===
Rank	Athlete	Country	Event(s)	From	To	Gold	Silver	Bronze	Total
1	**Joseph Clarke**	Great Britain	K1, KX, KXI	2021	2026	**6**	1	0	7
2	Jon Lugbill	United States	C1	1979	1989	5	1	0	6
3	Pavol Hochschorner	Slovakia	C2	2002	2011	5	0	2	7
3	Peter Hochschorner	Slovakia	C2	2002	2011	5	0	2	7
5	Richard Fox	Great Britain	K1	1979	1993	5	0	1	6
6	**Michal Martikán**	Slovakia	C1	1995	2017	4	3	**4**	**11**
7	Manfred Merkel	East Germany	C2, Mixed C2	1959	1965	4	0	0	4
8	Fabien Lefèvre	France, United States	C1, C2, K1	2002	2014	3	3	1	7
9	Tony Estanguet	France	C1	2003	2010	3	3	0	6
10	Manfred Schubert	East Germany	C1	1957	1965	3	1	1	5

=== Women ===
Rank	Athlete	Country	Event(s)	From	To	Gold	Silver	Bronze	Total
1	**Jessica Fox**	Australia	C1, K1, KX, KXI	2010	2026	**12**	4	2	**18**
2	Ludmila Polesná	Czechoslovakia	K1	1961	1971	4	1	0	5
3	**Mallory Franklin**	Great Britain	C1, K1	2013	2023	2	**5**	1	8
4	Jana Dukátová	Slovakia	C1, K1	2006	2017	2	3	0	5
5	**Ricarda Funk**	Germany	K1	2015	2022	2	1	2	5
6	Štěpánka Hilgertová	Czech Republic	K1	1997	2007	2	1	1	4
7	Elizabeth Sharman	Great Britain	K1	1979	1987	2	1	0	3
7	Myriam Fox-Jerusalmi	France	K1	1987	1993	2	1	0	3
9	**Klaudia Zwolińska**	Poland	C1, K1, KX	2023	2026	2	0	3	5
10	Angelika Bahmann	East Germany	K1	1971	1977	2	0	1	3

== Medals (1949-2026) ==
Updated after the 2026 ICF Canoe Slalom World Championships.

Rank	Nation	Gold	Silver	Bronze	Total
1	France	66	65	40	171
2	East Germany	49	42	30	121
3	Czech Republic	40	32	28	100
4	Great Britain	38	29	42	109
5	Germany	35	33	33	101
6	Czechoslovakia	33	45	41	119
7	Slovakia	26	23	20	69
8	West Germany	25	26	26	77
9	United States	25	24	20	69
10	Australia	18	8	7	33
11	Austria	15	12	15	42
12	Switzerland	9	11	19	39
13	Slovenia	9	8	18	35
14	Poland	7	14	17	38
15	Italy	4	7	9	20
16	Spain	3	7	10	20
17	Yugoslavia	2	5	7	14
18	Brazil	1	1	4	6
19	Canada	1	1	0	2
20	Russia	0	2	4	6
21	Netherlands	0	2	1	3
22	New Zealand	0	1	2	3
23	Andorra	0	1	1	2
24	China	0	1	0	1
24	Croatia	0	1	0	1
24	Individual Neutral Athletes	0	1	0	1
24	Japan	0	1	0	1
28	Argentina	0	0	1	1
28	Morocco	0	0	1	1
28	Russian Canoe Federation	0	0	1	1
Totals (30 entries)		406	403	397	1,206

- Russian athletes competed under the flag of the Russian Canoe Federation at the 2021 ICF Canoe Slalom World Championships.
- 3 bronze not awarded in 1949 ICF Canoe Slalom World Championships.
- 1 bronze not awarded in 1951 ICF Canoe Slalom World Championships.
- 1 bronze not awarded in 1957 ICF Canoe Slalom World Championships.
- 1 silver and 1 bronze not awarded in 1959 ICF Canoe Slalom World Championships.
- 1 bronze not awarded in 1963 ICF Canoe Slalom World Championships.
- 1 bronze not awarded in 1969 ICF Canoe Slalom World Championships.
- 1 share gold in 2006 ICF Canoe Slalom World Championships.

== See also ==
- Canoe slalom
- ICF Masters Canoe Slalom World Championships
- Canoe Slalom World Cup
- ICF World Junior and U23 Canoe Slalom Championships
- ICF Canoe Slalom World Rankings
- ICF Canoe Sprint World Championships
- ICF Canoe Marathon World Championship
- Canoeing at the Summer Olympics
