= Deaths in June 2006 =

The following is a list of notable deaths in June 2006.

Entries for each day are listed alphabetically by surname. A typical entry lists information in the following sequence:

- Name, age, country of citizenship at birth, subsequent country of citizenship (if applicable), reason for notability, cause of death (if known), and reference.

== June 2006 ==
=== 1 ===
- Radu Bălescu, 73, Romanian scientist.
- Frederick S. Billig, 73, American aerospace engineer.
- Shokichi Iyanaga, 100, Japanese mathematician.
- Rocío Jurado, 61, Spanish singer and actress, pancreatic cancer.
- Eddie Malone, 85, American baseball player (Chicago White Sox).
- Argentino Molinuevo Sr., 95, Argentine equestrian and Olympian (1952).
- Allan Prior, 84, British television writer (Z-Cars, Howards' Way, The Charmer), father of folk singer Maddy Prior.
- Abdul Latif Sharif, 59, Egyptian chemist, suspect in the femicides in Ciudad Juárez, Mexico, officially of natural causes, rumored poisoning.
- Jack Shelton, 82, Australian cricketer.
- William Winn, 59, American educational psychologist.

=== 2 ===
- Ronald Cass, 83, British film composer and screenwriter (The Young Ones, Summer Holiday).
- Carlos Chávez, 77, Panamanian Olympic weightlifter (1952).
- Roy Farran, 85, British army officer.
- Vyacheslav Klykov, 66, Russian sculptor and nationalist politician.
- Bernard Loomis, 82, American toymaker responsible for Strawberry Shortcake and Star Wars action figures, heart disease.
- Maynard Morrison, 97, American football player (Michigan Wolverines, Brooklyn Dodgers).
- Leon Pownall, 63, Canadian actor, cancer.
- Keith Smith, 53, English rugby footballer.
- Graham Symonds, 70, English swimmer and Olympian (1956).
- Vince Welnick, 55, American keyboardist (Grateful Dead), suicide by exsanguination.
- Edward Yates, 87, American television director (American Bandstand).

=== 3 ===
- Leo Clarke, 82, Australian Roman Catholic Bishop of Maitland–Newcastle, Australia, 1976-1995.
- Brian Duke, 79, Ugandan-born tropical disease expert who helped to save millions from river blindness.
- Victório Ferraz, 82, Brazilian Olympic sailor (1948).
- Johnny Grande, 76, American pianist, member of Bill Haley's backing band, The Comets. Complications arising from cancer.
- George Kashdan, 78, American comic book writer and editor (House of Mystery, Aquaman, Sgt. Rock).
- László Mahó, 65, Hungarian cyclist and Olympian (1964).
- Jorma Ruissalo, 94, Finnish Olympic speed skater (1936).
- Doug Serrurier, 85, South African former Grand Prix racing driver and constructor.
- Sid Tinsley, 86, American football player (Clemson Tigers, Pittsburgh Steelers).

=== 4 ===
- Vic Belsham, 80, New Zealand rugby league player (national team) and referee.
- Alec Bregonzi, 76, British actor.
- Bill Fleming, 92, American MLB pitcher (Boston Red Sox, Chicago Cubs)
- Ron Jones, 41, American Major League Baseball player (Philadelphia Phillies), brain hemorrhage.
- Richard Kapp, 69, American conductor and founder of the Philharmonia Virtuosi.
- John Kerr, 46, British footballer (Tranmere Rovers).
- Fulvia Mammi, 79, Italian actress (Against the Law).
- Anthony Marreco, 90, British barrister, junior Counsel at the Nuremberg Trials and founding member of Amnesty International.
- Sir John Rowlands, 90, British air marshal and George Cross recipient.
- William M. Steger, 85, United States district court judge and Republican candidate for Governor of Texas in 1960.
- Robert Taylor, 66, American football player (New York Giants), and coach.

=== 5 ===
- Frederick Franck, 97, Dutch artist, author, and dentist.
- Elizabeth Fretwell, 85, Australian opera singer best known for her performances with the Sadler's Wells company.
- Eric Gregg, 55, American former Major League Baseball umpire, stroke.
- Edward L. Moyers, 77, American railroad executive.
- Robert Ross, 86, American leader of the Muscular Dystrophy Association for 44 years and persuaded Jerry Lewis to undertake a yearly telethon to raise money for muscular dystrophy, complications of broken hip.
- Harley Rutledge, 80, American physicist and ufologist.
- Rinus Schaap, 84, Dutch footballer and Olympian (1948).
- Richard Stone, 79, Australian Olympic fencer (1956, 1960).
- Huda Sultan, 80, Egyptian actress, cancer.
- József Vadas, 94, Hungarian Olympic sprinter (1936).

=== 6 ===
- Leslie Alcock, 81, British pioneer of Dark Age archaeology, led the team that excavated Cadbury Castle.
- María Teresa López Boegeholz, 78, Chilean oceanographer.
- Wilson Charles, 98, American Olympic decathlete (1932).
- Norman Lewis, 90, American fencer and Olympian (1948).
- Neil McKechnie, 67, British swimmer and Olympian (1956).
- Arnold Newman, 88, American photographer who pioneered "environmental portraiture".
- Billy Preston, 59, American musician ("You Are So Beautiful", "Nothing from Nothing"), kidney failure.
- Hilton Ruiz, 54, American jazz pianist, injuries from a fall.
- Léon Weil, 109, French World War I veteran.
- Jason Moss, 31, American attorney and author (The Last Victim)/

=== 7 ===
- Abu Musab al-Zarqawi, 39, Jordanian leader of Al-Qaeda in Iraq, US military strike.
- Abu Abdul Rahman, spiritual adviser for Al-Qaeda in Iraq, US military strike.
- Roy Brain, 79, Australian cricketer.
- Herbert Buhtz, 95, German rower and Olympian (1932).
- Zbigniew Jaskowski, 77, Polish footballer and Olympian (1952).
- Terrence McCann, 74, American wrestler, Olympic gold medalist (1960), cancer.
- Ingo Preminger, 95, Austrian-born American talent agent (Dalton Trumbo) and film producer (M*A*S*H, The Salzburg Connection).
- Mickey Sims, 51, American football player (Cleveland Browns), heart attack.
- Louis B. Sohn, 92, Ukrainian-born scholar of international law, helped draft the UN Charter.
- John Tenta, 42, Canadian professional wrestler (WWF), bladder cancer.

=== 8 ===
- Jim Birr, 89, American basketball player.
- Jake Copass, 86, American cowboy poet, leukemia.
- Robert Donner, 75, American actor (Mork & Mindy, The Waltons, High Plains Drifter), aneurysm.
- Michael Forrestall, 73, Canadian politician.
- Jaxon, 65, American comic book artist, co-founder of Rip Off Press.
- Mykola Kolessa, 102, Ukrainian composer and conductor.
- Matta El Meskeen, 87, Egyptian Coptic Orthodox monk, Spiritual Father of St. Macarius' Monastery in the Wilderness of Scetis, Egypt.
- John Roberts, 72, Australian businessman, founder of Australian construction company Multiplex, Complications of diabetes.
- Jamal Abu Samhadana, Palestinian leader of PA / Hamas forces in Gaza Strip and PRC. Killed by Israeli air strike.
- Talcott Williams Seelye, 84, American diplomat.
- Sir Peter Smithers, 92, British politician, MP for Winchester and Secretary General of the Council of Europe.

=== 9 ===
- Kinga Choszcz, 33, Polish author, cerebral malaria.
- Drafi Deutscher, 60, German singer.
- Patricia Janus, 74, American poet, heart attack.
- Clyde LeForce, 83, American football player (Tulsa Golden Hurricane, Detroit Lions).
- Vinko Rosić, 65, Croatian Olympic water polo player (1964).
- Enzo Siciliano, 72, Italian writer, diabetes.
- Vern Williams, 76, American bluegrass mandolin player and singer.

=== 10 ===
- Abdul Karim Abdullah al-Arashi, 72, Yemeni politician, former President of North Yemen.
- Hubertus Czernin, 50, Austrian journalist who helped return paintings looted by the Nazis, mastocytosis.
- Moe Drabowsky, 70, Polish-born American baseball player (Chicago Cubs, Kansas City Athletics, Baltimore Orioles), multiple myeloma.
- German Goldenshteyn, 71, Bessarabian-born clarinetist and klezmer musician.
- Wulff-Dieter Heintz, 76, German astronomer at Swarthmore College.
- Curt Henderson, 89, American basketball player.
- Kenneth Jack, 81, Australian artist.
- Peter Kennedy, 83, British folklorist.
- Price King, 81, American Olympic racewalker (1952).
- Philip Merrill, 72, American publisher and diplomat, suicide by gunshot.
- Ruddy Thomas, 54, Jamaican singer, heart attack.

=== 11 ===
- Michael Bartosh, 28, American Mac OS X Server expert, injuries from a fall.
- Ernest Arthur Bell, 79, British biochemist, Director of the Royal Botanic Gardens, Kew.
- James Cameron, 92, American civil rights activist, founder of America's Black Holocaust Museum, lymphoma.
- Neroli Fairhall, 61, New Zealand paraplegic archer and Olympic competitor (1984).
- Rolande Falcinelli, 86, French organist and composer.
- Suzanne Morrow Francis, 75, Canadian figure skater and Olympian (1948, 1952).
- Tim Hildebrandt, 67, American artist, complications from diabetes.
- Hugh Latimer, 93, English actor and toy maker.
- Mike Quarry, 55, American boxer, dementia.
- Bruce Shand, 89, British Army officer, cancer.

=== 12 ===
- Anna Lee Aldred, 85, American jockey and first woman in US to receive a jockey's licence, member of the National Cowgirl Hall of Fame.
- Andrew William "Nicky" Barr, 90, Australian rugby union player and World War II fighter pilot
- Chakufwa Chihana, 67, Malawian politician, opposition figure who ran unsuccessfully for President losing to Bakili Muluzi, brain tumour.
- György Ligeti, 83, Hungarian composer.
- José Leite Lopes, 87, Brazilian physicist.
- János Sólyomvári, 52, Hungarian Olympic weightlifter (1980).
- Kenneth Thomson, 2nd Baron Thomson of Fleet, 82, Canadian billionaire, media mogul and art collector. Possible heart attack.

=== 13 ===
- Eddie Crossan, 80, Northern Irish footballer.
- Freddie Gorman, 67, US songwriter.
- Leonard Gray, 54, American basketball player (Long Beach State Beach, Seattle SuperSonics, Washington Bullets).
- Charles Haughey, 80, Irish politician, Taoiseach (1979–1981, 1982, 1987–1992), prostate cancer.
- Hiroyuki Iwaki, 73, Japanese conductor, congestive heart failure.
- Luis Jiménez, 65, American sculptor, crushed by a statue.
- Burke Riley, 92, American lawyer and politician, Alzheimer's disease.
- Dennis Shepherd, 79, South African Olympic boxer (1948).
- Barry Thompson, 58, New Zealand rugby union player (Canterbury, national team).

=== 14 ===
- Monty Berman, 94, British B-movie producer.
- Silvio Bettio, 77, Canadian ice hockey player (Boston Bruins).
- Gordon Blair, 86, Canadian lawyer and politician, member of the House of Commons of Canada (1968-1972).
- Col Hudson, 79, Australian rugby league footballer.
- Surinder Kaur, 77, Indian Punjabi folk and classical singer known as the "nightingale of Punjab".
- Radomir Kovačević, 52, Serbian judoka and Olympian (1976, 1980, 1984).
- Edward Craig Morris, 66, American archaeologist.
- Jean Roba, 75, Belgian comics writer
- James Davis Speed, 91, American politician.

=== 15 ===
- Betty Curtis, 70, Italian singer, winner of Sanremo Music Festival in 1961 with Luciano Tajoli.
- Raymond Devos, 83, French humorist.
- Ján Langoš, 59, Slovak politician, head of the National Memory Institute of Slovakia.
- Zdeněk Parma, 81, Czech Olympic alpine skier (1948).
- Carlos Tovar, 92, Peruvian football player and Olympian (1936).

=== 16 ===
- Roland Boyes, 69, British Labour politician and photographer, Alzheimer's disease.
- Barbara Epstein, 76, American literary editor, co-founder of the New York Review of Books, lung cancer.
- Artie Malvin, 83, American composer and lyricist.
- Scott Manning, 48, Canadian athlete, builder and pilot of the world's smallest jet, crash landing.
- Daphne Osborne, 76, British botanist.
- Igor Śmiałowski, 88, Polish actor.

=== 17 ===
- Norma Becker, 76, American anti-war activist, former chair of the War Resisters League.
- Cláudio Besserman Vianna (Bussunda), 43, Brazilian comedian, member of Casseta & Planeta, heart attack
- Arthur Franz, 86, American character actor (Sands of Iwo Jima, Invaders from Mars), emphysema and heart disease.
- Charles Johnson, 96, American Negro league baseball (Chicago American Giants), complications from prostate cancer.
- Mikhail Lapshin, 71, Russian politician, leader of the Agrarian Party and former president of the Altai Republic (2002–2006), cause unknown.
- Charles Older, 88, American Los Angeles Superior Court judge who presided over the Charles Manson trial, complications of a fall.
- Abdul-Khalim Saydullayev, 38 or 39, Chechen separatist rebel leader.
- Hiroaki Shukuzawa, 55, Japanese rugby union coach, heart attack.
- Julian Slade, 76, English composer and lyricist of Salad Days, cancer.
- Andrzej Tomza, 74, Polish Olympic sports shooter (1960).
- Bob Weaver, 77, American TV Florida-based weatherman known as "Weaver the Weatherman" on WTVJ, cancer.

=== 18 ===
- Alan Arkey, 75, Australian rugby league footballer.
- Luke Belton, 87, Irish politician.
- Hubert Cornfield, 77, Turkish film director (The Night of the Following Day).
- Nathaniel N. Craley Jr., 78, American politician, member of the United States House of Representatives (1965–67) from Pennsylvania.
- Jesus Fuertes, 68, Spanish painter, heart attack.
- Chris and Cru Kahui, 3-months, New Zealand child homicide victims.
- Gică Petrescu, 91, Romanian singer.
- Sir David Poole, 68, British judge.
- Donald Reilly, 72, American cartoonist (The New Yorker), cancer.
- René Renou, 54, French vintner, president of INAO.
- Netta Rheinberg, 94, English cricketer.
- Vincent Sherman, 99, American film director (Mr. Skeffington, The Young Philadelphians), natural causes.
- Richard Stahl, 74, American actor (9 to 5, Ghosts of Mississippi, Five Easy Pieces), Parkinson's disease.
- Madeleine St John, 64, Australian novelist, emphysema.

=== 19 ===
- Hugh Baird, 76, Scottish footballer (Leeds United, Aberdeen, Airdrieonians).
- Walt Kellner, 77, American baseball player (Philadelphia Athletics).
- Priit Kolbre, 50, Estonian diplomat, ambassador to Finland (since 2005).
- Duane Roland, 53, American guitarist and a founder of rock band Molly Hatchet.
- Howard Shanet, 87, US conductor and composer.
- Alfred Stäger, 81, Swiss Olympic alpine skier (1948).
- Arthur Yap, 64, Singaporean poet, artist, and lecturer, English Department, University of Singapore, throat cancer.

=== 20 ===
- Maurice Bevan, 85, British bass-baritone.
- Reg Blakemore, 81, Welsh rugby player.
- Bill Daniel, 90, American politician, Governor of Guam.
- Evelyn Dubrow, 95, American labor advocate awarded the Presidential Medal of Freedom in 1999.
- Billy Johnson, 87, American baseball player (New York Yankees, St. Louis Cardinals).
- E. Pierce Marshall, 67, American businessman, son of J. Howard Marshall and Anna Nicole Smith's stepson and plaintiff in their inheritance feud, aggressive infection.
- William Shurcliff, 97, American physicist, who helped develop the atomic bomb.
- Claydes Charles Smith, 57, American guitarist (Kool and the Gang).
- Jakub Węgrzynkiewicz, 77, Polish ski jumper and Olympian (1952).

=== 21 ===
- Theo Bell, 52, American National Football League player (Pittsburgh Steelers, Tampa Bay Buccaneers), kidney disease and scleroderma.
- Vern Leroy Bullough, 77, American medical historian, known for his history of nursing, cancer.
- Denis Faul, 73, Irish Roman Catholic priest, former chaplain at the Maze Prison, outspoken critic of The Troubles and a key figure in attempts to end the 1981 Irish Hunger Strike in Northern Ireland, cancer.
- Jacques Lanzmann, 79, French author, editor and songwriter.
- Khamis al-Obeidi, 39, Iraqi defense lawyer for Saddam Hussein, kidnapped and shot.
- Rolf Stigersand, 89, Norwegian Olympic diver (1948).
- David Walton, 43, British economist, member of the Bank of England's Monetary Policy Committee
- Jonathan Wordsworth, 73, English academic, scholar of Romanticism and chair of the Wordsworth Trust.

=== 22 ===
- Heinz Ansbacher, 101, German-born psychologist and expert in the work of Alfred Adler.
- Back Alley John, 51, Canadian musician.
- Paul Campbell, 88, American baseball player (Boston Red Sox, Detroit Tigers).
- John Howell, 51, British Olympic bobsledder (1980).
- Paul Humphrey, 88, American football player (Purdue Boilermakers, Brooklyn Dodgers).
- Gilbert Monckton, 2nd Viscount Monckton of Brenchley, 90, British army general.
- Moose, 15, American canine actor (Frasier, My Dog Skip).
- Chanel Petro Nixon, 16, American student, murder victim in Brooklyn, New York.
- Sir Peter Edward Lionel Russell, 92, British historian.
- Sir Michael Scott Weir, 81, British diplomat, Ambassador to Egypt (1979–1985).
- Edwin Young, 58, American Olympic diver (1968), and diving coach.

=== 23 ===
- Martin Adler, 47, Swedish journalist. Shot by unknown assailant in Mogadishu, Somalia.
- Roberto Bordeu, 74, Argentine Olympic bobsledder (1952, 1964).
- Harriet, 176, Galápagos tortoise believed to be the third oldest animal in the world and allegedly owned by Charles Darwin, heart failure.
- Luke Graham, 66, American professional wrestler (WWF), heart failure.
- Hokuten'yū Katsuhiko, 45, Japanese sumo wrestler.
- Jorma Kulo, 82, Finnish Olympic canoeist (1952).
- Budhi Kunderan, 66, Indian cricketer, wicketkeeper/batsman, lung cancer.
- Cheché Martín, 82, Spanish footballer.
- John Morgan, 62, English golfer.
- Basil O'Ferrall, 81, Irish Anglican priest, Dean of Jersey (1985–1993).
- Tom Pelly, 70, Australian rules footballer (North Melbourne).
- Aaron Spelling, 83, American television producer (Charlie's Angels, Starsky and Hutch, Beverly Hills, 90210), complications from a stroke.
- Dave Webster, 68, American football player (Dallas Texans).
- Leo Wells, 88, American baseball player (Chicago White Sox).

=== 24 ===
- Denice Denton, 46, American professor, chancellor of the University of California, Santa Cruz, suicide by jumping.
- Børre Falkum-Hansen, 86, Norwegian Olympic sailor (1952).
- Ben Garry, 50, American football player (Baltimore Colts).
- Tichaona Jokonya, 67, Zimbabwean politician, Information & Publicity Minister, cardiac arrest.
- Heinz-Günther Lehmann, 83, German swimmer and Olympian (1952).
- Patsy Ramsey, 49, American beauty pageant winner, mother of JonBenét Ramsey, ovarian cancer.
- Lyle Stuart, 83, American journalist and publisher.
- Gerald Tomlinson, 73, American mystery and baseball writer.
- Ric Weiland, 53, American Microsoft pioneer, developed BASIC, COBOL and Microsoft Works, suicide by gunshot.
- Albert Zachary, 92, American baseball player (Brooklyn Dodgers).

=== 25 ===
- Elkan Allan, 83, British television producer, created Ready Steady Go! and developed the first television listings for the UK in the Sunday Times.
- Eliyahu Asheri, 18, Israeli civilian kidnapped and murdered by militants in the West Bank city of Ramallah.
- Charles Barrow, 84, American justice of the Texas Supreme Court.
- George W. Clarke, 100, American politician.
- Richard DeVore, 73, American ceramicist, lung cancer.
- George Eyrich, 81, American baseball player (Philadelphia Phillies).
- Kenneth Griffith, 84, Welsh actor and documentary maker, Parkinson's disease.
- Marjorie Hood, 92, American baseball player.
- Akbar Hossain, 65, Bangladeshi Minister for Shipping and hero of 1971 Bangladesh Liberation War, heart attack.
- Irving Kaplansky, 89, American mathematician at the University of Chicago.
- Dibya Khaling, 54, Nepali musician, composer and lyricist, responsible for 1,000 songs, cardiac arrest.
- Arif Mardin, 74, Turkish-American Grammy Award winning music producer, pancreatic cancer.
- Sophie Maslow, 95, American choreographer.
- Gad Navon, 84, Moroccan-born Former Chief Israeli Military Rabbi, cancer.
- Rolf Olinger, 80, Swiss Olympic alpine skier (1948).
- Jaap Penraat, 88, Dutch architect and member of Dutch resistance in World War II.
- Seema Aissen Weatherwax, 100, Ukrainian photographer.

=== 26 ===
- Bear JJ1 (Bruno the Bear), the first wild bear in Germany in 170 years, shot to death.
- Paulino Díaz, 71, Mexican Olympic sports shooter (1960).
- George Frenn, 64, American hammer thrower and Olympian (1972).
- José Luis de Frutos, 56, Spanish Olympic judoka (1976).
- Johnny Jenkins, 67, American blues guitarist who influenced Otis Redding and Jimi Hendrix, stroke.
- Parami Kulatunga, Sri Lankan military officer, Deputy Chief of Staff of the Sri Lankan Army, bomb blast.
- Maria Grazia Marchelli, 74, Italian Olympic alpine skier (1952, 1956).
- Frederick Mayer, 84, German educational philosopher, creativity expert, author of "History of Educational Thought".
- Don Putman, 83, American basketball player (Colorado Buffaloes, St. Louis Bombers).
- Eric Rofes, 51, American author and AIDS educator, heart attack.
- Margaret Russo, 74, American baseball player.
- Stan Torgerson, 82, American radio announcer for Ole Miss football and basketball games.
- Jack Urban, 77, American baseball player (Kansas City Athletics, St. Louis Cardinals).
- Jeff Winkless, 65, American voice actor, brain tumor.

=== 27 ===
- Eileen Barton, 81, American singer, actress, ovarian cancer
- Robert Carrier, 82, American celebrity chef.
- J. Robert Elliott, 96, US Federal District Judge who overturned the conviction of Lt. William Calley.
- George Johnson, 91, Puerto Rican Olympic sports shooter (1948)
- Sir Gerard Mansfield, 84, British admiral.
- Marta Mata, 80, Spanish politician and pedagogue.
- Ángel Maturino Reséndiz, 45, Mexican convicted serial killer, execution by lethal injection.

=== 28 ===
- Jim Baen, 62, American science fiction editor and publisher.
- Fabián Bielinsky, 47, Argentine film director, heart attack.
- Vikram Dharma, 44/45, Indian film stunt director.
- Theodore Levitt, 81, German-born former editor of the Harvard Business Review and author of books on marketing, coined the term globalization.
- June Lloyd, Baroness Lloyd of Highbury, 78, British paediatrician and life peer.
- Mahmoud Mestiri, 77, Tunisian diplomat and politician, former foreign minister.
- George Page, 71, American television host, creator and narrator of the PBS series Nature.
- Samir Qotb, 68, Egyptian footballer and Olympian (1960, 1964).
- Peter Rawlinson, Baron Rawlinson of Ewell, 87, English barrister, politician and author.
- Fernando Sanchez, 70, Belgian-born fashion designer.
- George Unwin, 93, British pilot and RAF officer, Battle of Britain flying ace.
- Lennie Weinrib, 71, American voice actor (H.R. Pufnstuf, The New Adventures of Batman, Scooby-Doo and Scrappy-Doo).

=== 29 ===
- Curly Clement, 86, American baseball umpire.
- Joseph Edamaruku, 71, Indian journalist, heart attack.
- Joyce Hatto, 77, English classical pianist, who plagiarized more than 100 albums, cancer.
- Maire Hider, 87, British Olympic diver (1948).
- Ed Hugus, 82, American racing driver.
- Stanley Moskowitz, 68, American CIA liaison to Congress, heart attack.
- Tadao Onishi, 63, Japanese footballer.
- Mart Paama, 68, Soviet Estonian Olympic javelin thrower (1960, 1968).
- Wallace Potts, 59, American film archivist for the Rudolf Nureyev Foundation, lymphoma.
- Lloyd Richards, 87, Canadian-American theatre director, first black Broadway director, Tony Award winner, heart failure.
- Pierre Andrew Rinfret, 82, Canadian-born American economist and political candidate.
- Vir Singh, 75, Indian Olympic gymnast (1952).
- Randy Walker, 52, American football coach, apparent heart attack
- F. Mark Wyatt, 86, American CIA officer, who delivered bags of money to swing the 1948 Italy election.

=== 30 ===
- Ferdinand Boogaerts, 85, Belgian footballer.
- Robert Gernhardt, 68, German satirist.
- Leif Gotfredsen, 72, Canadian Olympic rower (1964).
- Edward S. Hamilton, 89, American Army officer, highly decorated Army veteran during World War II, pneumonia.
- Harold Olmo, 96, American grape breeder and geneticist.
- Richard Streeton, 75, English sports journalist
- Ross Tompkins, 68, American The Tonight Show pianist.
