= Canoeing at the 1952 Summer Olympics =

Canoeing at the Games of the XV Olympiad
- No. of events: 9

At the 1952 Summer Olympics in Helsinki, nine events in sprint canoe racing were contested. The program was unchanged from the previous Games in 1948.

== Medal table ==
Rank	Nation	Gold	Silver	Bronze	Total
1	Finland	4	1	1	6
2	Sweden	1	3	0	4
3	Czechoslovakia	1	1	1	3
4	France	1	0	1	2
5	Denmark	1	0	0	1
5	United States	1	0	0	1
7	Hungary	0	2	1	3
8	Austria	0	1	1	2
9	Canada	0	1	0	1
10	Germany	0	0	3	3
11	Soviet Union	0	0	1	1
Totals (11 entries)		9	9	9	27

== Medal summary ==
=== Men's events ===
Games	Gold	Silver	Bronze
C-1 1000 metres	Josef Holeček; Czechoslovakia	János Parti; Hungary	Olavi Ojanperä; Finland
C-1 10000 metres	Frank Havens; United States	Gábor Novák; Hungary	Alfréd Jindra; Czechoslovakia
C-2 1000 metres	Bent Peder Rasch and Finn Haunstoft (DEN)	Jan Brzák-Felix and Bohumil Kudrna (TCH)	Egon Drews and Wilfried Soltau (GER)
C-2 10000 metres	Georges Turlier and Jean Laudet (FRA)	Kenneth Lane and Donald Hawgood (CAN)	Egon Drews and Wilfried Soltau (GER)
K-1 1000 metres	Gert Fredriksson; Sweden	Thorvald Strömberg; Finland	Louis Gantois; France
K-1 10000 metres	Thorvald Strömberg; Finland	Gert Fredriksson; Sweden	Michael Scheuer; Germany
K-2 1000 metres	Kurt Wires and Yrjö Hietanen (FIN)	Lars Glassér and Ingemar Hedberg (SWE)	Maximilian Raub and Herbert Wiedermann (AUT)
K-2 10000 metres	Kurt Wires and Yrjö Hietanen (FIN)	Gunnar Åkerlund and Hans Wetterström (SWE)	Ferenc Varga and József Gurovits (HUN)

=== Women's event ===
Games	Gold	Silver	Bronze
K-1 500 metres	Sylvi Saimo; Finland	Gertrude Liebhart; Austria	Nina Savina; Soviet Union

== Participating nations ==
- Austria (7)
- Belgium (4)
- Canada (11)
- Czechoslovakia (13)
- Denmark (9)
- Finland (10)
- France (13)
- Germany (10)
- Great Britain (7)
- Hungary (12)
- Italy (6)
- Luxembourg (4)
- Netherlands (5)
- Norway (4)
- Romania (1)
- Saar (3)
- Soviet Union (13)
- Sweden (10)
- Switzerland (7)
- United States (9)
- Yugoslavia (1)
