= Canoeing at the 1952 Summer Olympics – Men's C-2 1000 metres =

These are the results of the men's C-2 1000 metres competition in canoeing at the 1952 Summer Olympics. The C-2 event is raced by two-man sprint canoes. Because there were eleven teams in this event, heats were introduced. Both the heats and final took place on July 28.

== Medalists ==
Gold	Silver	Bronze
Bent Peder Rasch and Finn Haunstoft (DEN)	Jan Brzák-Felix and Bohumil Kudrna (TCH)	Egon Drews and Wilfried Soltau (GER)

== Heats ==
The 11 teams first raced in two heats. The top four teams in each heat advanced directly to the final.

Heat 1

Rank	Athletes	Time	Notes
1	Bent Peder Rasch and Finn Haunstoft (DEN)	4:32.9	QF
2	Jan Brzák-Felix and Bohumil Kudrna (TCH)	4:43.9	QF
3	Arthur Johnson and Thomas Hodgson (CAN)	4:44.9	QF
4	István Bodor and József Tuza (HUN)	4:51.5	QF
5	Tuomo Tuormaa and Matti Havulinna (FIN)	4:54.0	
6	Aleksandr Krasavin and Sergey Chumakov (URS)	4:54.9	

Heat 2

Rank	Athletes	Time	Notes
1	Georges Dransart and Armand Loreau (FRA)	4:38.8	QF
2	Kurt Liebhart and Engelbert Lulla (AUT)	4:40.2	QF
3	John Haas and Frank Krick (USA)	4:43.3	QF
4	Egon Drews and Wilfried Soltau (GER)	4:48.4	QF
5	Rune Blomqvist and Harry Lindbäck (SWE)	4:50.2	

== Final ==
Rank	Athletes	Time
1st place, gold medalist(s)	Bent Peder Rasch and Finn Haunstoft (DEN)	4:38.3
2nd place, silver medalist(s)	Jan Brzák-Felix and Bohumil Kudrna (TCH)	4:42.9
3rd place, bronze medalist(s)	Egon Drews and Wilfried Soltau (GER)	4:48.3
4	Georges Dransart and Armand Loreau (FRA)	4:48.6
5	István Bodor and József Tuza (HUN)	4:51.9
6	Kurt Liebhart and Engelbert Lulla (AUT)	4:55.8
7	John Haas and Frank Krick (USA)	4:59.0
8	Arthur Johnson and Thomas Hodgson (CAN)	5:01.4
