= Jacques Rousseau =

Jacques Rousseau may refer to:

- Jacques Rousseau (painter) (1630–1693), French painter
- Jacques Rousseau (athlete) (1951-2024), French long jumper
- Jacques Rousseau (secular activist) (born 1971), South African secular activist and social commentator
- Jacques Rousseau (diplomat) (1683–1753), Swiss-born envoy on behalf of Louis XIV of France
- Jacques Rousseau (canoeist) (c. 1925–2009), French slalom canoeist

== See also ==
- Jacques des Rousseaux (1600–1638), French painter active in Leiden
- Jean-Jacques Rousseau (1712–1778), Swiss Francophone philosopher, writer and composer
