= Pattantyús =

Pattantyús is a Hungarian surname that may possibly refer to:

- Ádám Pattantyús (born 1978), a Hungarian table tennis player.
- Dezső Pattantyús-Ábrahám (1875–1973), a Hungarian politician.
- Ernő Pattantyús-Ábrahám (1882–1945), a Hungarian journalist and writer, brother of Dezső.
