= Lindbeck =

Lindbeck is a surname. Notable people with the surname include:

- Assar Lindbeck (1930–2020), Swedish professor of economics at Stockholm University
- Em Lindbeck (1934–2008), American professional baseball outfielder
- Erica Lindbeck (born 1992), American voice actress known for her work with Bang Zoom
- George Lindbeck (1923–2018), American Lutheran theologian

== See also ==
- Assar Lindbeck Medal, bi-annual award for international recognition gained by a Swedish economist under 45
- Lindback (disambiguation)
- Lundbeck
- Lundbäck
