= Ernő =

- Gender: Male

Origin
- Region of origin: Hungary

Ernő is a Hungarian masculine given name. The similar Erno is a Finnish masculine given name. Notable people with either name include:

- Ernő Balogh (1897–1989), Hungarian pianist, composer, editor, and educator
- Ernő Bánk (1883–1962), Hungarian painter and teacher
- Ernő Béres (1928–2023), Hungarian long-distance runner and Olympic competitor
- Ernő Csíki (1875–194?), Hungarian entomologist
- Ernő Dohnányi (1877–1960), Hungarian conductor, composer, and pianist
- Ernő Foerk (1868–1934), Hungarian architect
- Ernő Garami (1876–1935), Hungarian politician
- Ernő Gereben (1907–1988), Hungarian–born Swiss chess master
- Ernő Gerő (1898–1980), Hungarian Communist Party politician
- Ernő Goldfinger (1902–1987), Hungarian-born British architect and furniture designer
- Ernő Gubányi (born 1950), Hungarian handball player and Olympic competitor
- Ernő Hetényi (1912–1999), Hungarian tibetologist, scholar and Buddhist
- Ernő Jendrassik (1858–1921), Hungarian physician and medical researcher
- Ernő Kiss (1799–1849), Hungarian Army general
- Ernő Koch (1898–1970), Hungarian-born American graphic artist
- Ernő Kolczonay (1953–2009), Hungarian fencer and Olympic medalist
- Ernő Kovács (born 1959), Hungarian mechanical technician and politician
- Ernő Lendvai (1925–1993), Hungarian music theorist and mathematician
- Ernő Mesterházy (born 1963), Hungarian politician
- Ernő Mihályfi (1898–1972), Hungarian politician
- Ernő Nagy (1898–1977), Hungarian fencer and Olympic medalist
- Ernő Noskó (born 1945), Hungarian football player and Olympic medalist
- Ernő Osvát (1877–1929), Hungarian writer and editor
- Erno Paasilinna (1935–2000), Finnish writer and journalist
- Ernő Pattantyús-Ábrahám (1882–1945), Hungarian journalist and writer
- Ernő Poeltenberg (1808–1849), Hungarian army general
- Ernő Polgár (1954–2018), Hungarian author
- Ernö Rapée (1891–1945), Hungarian-born American symphonic conductor
- Ernő Rubik (1910–1997), Hungarian aircraft designer
- Ernő Rubik (born 1944), Hungarian inventor (Rubik's Cube, etc.), architect and professor of architecture
- Ernő Solymosi (1940–2011), Hungarian football player and Olympic medalist
- Ernő Söptei (1925–1999), Hungarian sprint canoer and Olympic competitor
- Ernő Schubert (1881–1931), Hungarian track and field athlete and Olympic competitor
- Ernő Schwarz (1902–1977), Hungarian-born American soccer player, coach and promoter
- Erno "Emppu" Vuorinen (born 1978), Finnish guitarist
- Ernő Winter (1897–1971), Hungarian engineer and inventor
