= Pillwein =

Pillwein is a surname. Notable people with the surname include:

- Heidi Pillwein, Austrian slalom canoeist
- Rudolf Pillwein, Austrian slalom canoeist
