= Canoeing at the 1952 Summer Olympics – Men's C-2 10000 metres =

These are the results of the Men's C-2 10000 metres competition in canoeing at the 1952 Summer Olympics. The C-2 event is raced by two-man sprint canoes. Heats and final took place on July 27.

== Medalists ==
Gold	Silver	Bronze
Georges Turlier and Jean Laudet (FRA)	Kenneth Lane and Donald Hawgood (CAN)	Egon Drews and Wilfried Soltau (GER)

== Final ==
With only nine teams competing, a final was held.

Rank	Athletes	Time
1st place, gold medalist(s)	Georges Turlier and Jean Laudet (FRA)	54:08.3
2nd place, silver medalist(s)	Kenneth Lane and Donald Hawgood (CAN)	54:09.9
3rd place, bronze medalist(s)	Egon Drews and Wilfried Soltau (GER)	54:28.1
4	Valentin Orischenko and Nikolay Perevozchikov (URS)	54:34.6
5	John Haas and Frank Krick (USA)	54:42.5
6	Bohuslav Karlík and Oldřich Lomecký (TCH)	55:10.9
7	Ernő Söptei and Róbert Söptei (HUN)	55:35.3
8	Rune Blomqvist and Harry Lindbäck (SWE)	55:41.3
9	Jorma Kulo and Teppo Salmisaari (FIN)	56:28.2
