= Koníček =

Koníček means 'small horse' or 'hobby' in Czech. It is also a Czech surname that may refer to:

- Karel Koníček, Czechoslovak slalom canoeist
- Miroslav Koníček (born 1936), Czech rower
- Štěpán Koníček (1928–2006), Czech composer and conductor
