= Janine Maulet =

Sport
- Sport: Kayaking
- Event: Folding kayak
Medal record
Women's canoe slalom
Representing Switzerland
World Championships
Silver medal – second place	1949 Geneva	Folding K-1 team

Janine Maulet is a Swiss retired slalom canoeist who competed in the late 1940s. She won a silver medal in the folding K-1 team event at the 1949 ICF Canoe Slalom World Championships in Geneva.
