= Havulinna =

Havulinna is a Finnish surname. Notable people with the surname include:

- Kalle Havulinna (1924–2016), Finnish ice hockey player
- Matti Havulinna (1931–2012), Finnish sprint canoer
