= Jerschke =

Jerschke is a German surname. Notable people with the surname include:

- Günther Jerschke (1921–1997), German actor
- Oskar Jerschke (1861–1928), German playwright

== See also ==
- Jeschke
