= Werner Zimmermann =

Werner Zimmermann may refer to:

- Heinz Werner Zimmermann (1930-2023), German composer
- Werner Zimmermann (activist) (1893-1982), German Lebensreformer
- Werner Zimmermann (canoeist) (1915-1990), Swiss slalom canoeist
- Werner Zimmermann Jr., Swiss slalom canoeist
