= Operation Lizard =

Operation Lizard was the name given to a series of operations undertaken in Portuguese Timor by Australian troops in World War II using Hoehn military folboats to get from the vessel to the island and return.

- Lizard I, a party of four, was inserted onto the island on 17 July 1942 and evacuated by February 1943.
- Lizard II, a party of four, landed in September 1942
- Lizard III, a party, enforced the original Lizard parties in November 1942
- Portolizard—people who served with Lizard who stayed behind

== Sources ==
- "The Official History of the Operations and Administration of] Special Operations - Australia [(SOA), also known as the Inter-Allied Services Department (ISD) and Services Reconnaissance Department (SRD)] Volume 2 - Operations Part 1 Page 12-22". National Archives of Australia. p. 46-66.
- Hoehn, John. (2011). Commando Kayak: The role of the Australian Folboat in the Pacific Campaign. hirschbooks.net & ozatwar.com/hoehn. ISBN 978-3-033-01717-7
