= Josef Danek =

Austrian slalom canoeist

Sport
- Sport: Kayaking
- Event: Folding kayak
Medal record
Men's canoe slalom
Representing Austria
World Championships
Silver medal – second place	1949 Geneva	Folding K-1 team

Josef Danek is an Austrian retired slalom canoeist who competed from the late 1940s to the mid-1960s. He won a silver medal in the folding K-1 team event at the 1949 ICF Canoe Slalom World Championships in Geneva.
