= Jiří Valeš =

Sport
- Sport: Kayaking
- Event: Folding kayak
Medal record
Men's canoe slalom
Representing Czechoslovakia
World Championships
| Bronze medal – third place | 1949 Geneva | Folding K-1 team |

Jiří Valeš is a Czechoslovak retired slalom canoeist who competed in the late 1940s. He won a bronze medal in the folding K-1 team event at the 1949 ICF Canoe Slalom World Championships in Geneva.
