= Bohumil Kudrna =

Czechoslovak canoeist (1920–1991)

Medal record

Representing Czechoslovakia

Men's canoe sprint

Olympic Games
Gold medal – first place	1948 London	C-2 1000 m
Silver medal – second place	1952 Helsinki	C-2 1000 m

Canoe Sprint World Championships
Gold medal – first place	1950 Copenhagen	C-2 1000 m
Gold medal – first place	1950 Copenhagen	C-2 10000 m

Men's canoe slalom

Canoe Slalom World Championships
Silver medal – second place	1949 Geneva	C-2 team
Bronze medal – third place	1949 Geneva	C-2

Bohumil Kudrna (15 March 1920 – 11 February 1991) was a Czechoslovak flatwater and slalom canoeist who competed in the late 1940s and the early 1950s. Competing in two Summer Olympics, he won two medals with Jan Brzák-Felix in the C-2 1000 m event with a gold in 1948 and a silver in 1952.

Kudrna won two gold medals at the 1950 ICF Canoe Sprint World Championships in Copenhagen, earning them in the C-2 1000 m and C-2 10000 m events.

He also won two medals at the 1949 ICF Canoe Slalom World Championships in Geneva with a silver in the C-2 team event and a bronze in the C-2 event.
