= Róbert Söptei =

Hungarian canoeist

Róbert Söptei (27 August 1926 – 11 November 2016) was a Hungarian sprint canoeist who competed in the early 1950s. He finished seventh in the C-2 10000 m event at the 1952 Summer Olympics in Helsinki.
