= Alvin Jeschke =

Czechoslovak canoer

Sport
- Sport: Kayaking
- Event: Folding kayak
Medal record
Men's canoe slalom
Representing Czechoslovakia
World Championships
Bronze medal – third place	1949 Geneva	Folding K-1 team

Alvin Jeschke is a retired Czechoslovak slalom canoeist who competed from the late 1940s to the mid-1950s. He won a bronze medal in the folding K-1 team event at the 1949 ICF Canoe Slalom World Championships in Geneva.
