= Tuomo Tuormaa =

Finnish canoeist

Personal information
- Nationality: Finnish
- Born: October 27, 1926 Sortavala, Finland
- Died: February 25, 2010

Sport
- Sport: Canoeing
- Event: Sprint C-2 1000 m

Achievements and titles
- Olympic finals: 1952 Summer Olympics

Tuomo Tuormaa (27 October 1926 in Sortavala – 25 February 2010) was a Finnish sprint canoeist who competed in the early 1950s. He was eliminated in the heats of the C-2 1000 m event at the 1952 Summer Olympics in Helsinki.
