= Werner Zimmermann (canoeist) =

Swiss canoeist

Personal information
- Born: 19 May 1915
- Died: 1990 (aged 74–75)

Sport
- Sport: Kayaking
- Event: Folding kayak
Medal record
Men's canoe slalom
Representing Switzerland
World Championships
Gold medal – first place	1949 Geneva	Folding K-1 team
Bronze medal – third place	1949 Geneva	Folding K-1
Bronze medal – third place	1951 Steyr	Folding K-1 team

Werner Zimmermann (19 May 1915 – 1990) was a Swiss slalom and sprint canoeist who competed from the mid-1930s to the mid-1950s. As a slalom canoeist, he won three medals at the ICF Canoe Slalom World Championships with a gold (folding K-1 team: 1949) and two bronzes (folding K-1: 1949, folding K-1 team: 1951). As a sprint canoeist, he competed in two Summer Olympics. At the 1936 Summer Olympics, he finished sixth in the K-2 10000 m event. Twelve years later, he finished 11th in the K-2 10000 m event.
