= Heidi Pillwein =

Austrian canoeist

Sport
- Sport: Kayaking
- Event: Folding kayak
Medal record
Women's canoe slalom
Representing Austria
World Championships
Gold medal – first place	1949 Geneva	Folding K-1
Gold medal – first place	1949 Geneva	Folding K-1 team
Gold medal – first place	1951 Steyr	Folding K-1 team

Heidi Pillwein is an Austrian retired slalom canoeist who competed in the 1940s and the 1950s. She won three gold medals at the ICF Canoe Slalom World Championships, earning them in 1949 (Folding K-1, Folding K-1 team) and 1951 (Folding K-1 team).
