= Aleksandr Krasavin =

Soviet canoeist

Aleksandr Krasavin (born 1929) is a Soviet sprint canoer who competed in the early 1950s. He was eliminated in the heats of the C-2 1000 m event at the 1952 Summer Olympics in Helsinki.
