= Nikolay Perevozchikov =

Soviet canoeist (born 1927)

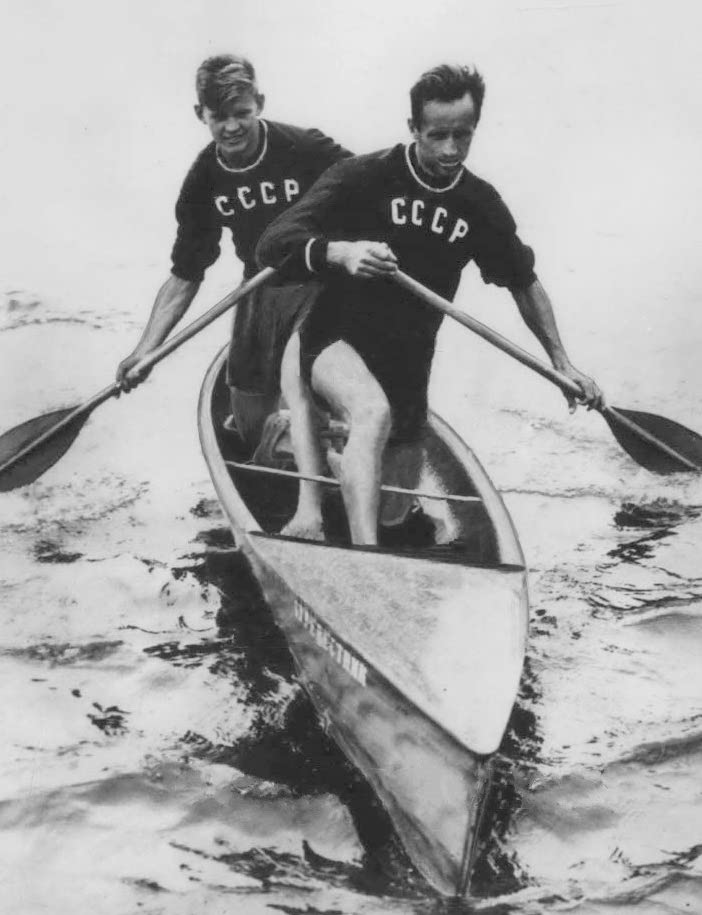
- Perevozchikov (right) and Orischenko in 1952

Personal information
- Born: 1927

Sport
- Sport: Canoe racing
- Coached by: Valentin Volodin

Nikolay Ivanovich Perevozchikov (Russian: Николай Иванович Перевозчиков; born 1927) was a Soviet sprint canoer who competed in the early 1950s. Together with Valentin Orischenko he finished fourth in the C-2 10000 m event at the 1952 Summer Olympics in Helsinki.
