= 1949 ICF Canoe Slalom World Championships =

Canoe slalom event in Geneva, Switzerland

The 1949 ICF Canoe Slalom World Championships were held in Geneva, Switzerland under the auspices of International Canoe Federation. It was the inaugural edition.

Eight sets of medals were awarded. There were four individual events and four team events. The team events were just combined times of three selected athletes or crews from the individual events. Only two teams were classified in the men's C1 team, men's C2 team and women's folding K1 team events.

== Medal summary ==
=== Men's ===
==== Canoe ====
Event	Gold	Points	Silver	Points	Bronze	Points
C1	Pierre d'Alençon (FRA)	528.0	Paul Huguet (FRA)	807.5	Jan Brzák-Felix (TCH)	1227.5
C1 team	France; Pierre d'Alençon; Paul Huguet; Marcel Renaud	3134.1	Czechoslovakia; Jan Brzák-Felix; Jiří Purchart; Bohuslav Karlík	4189.9	-	
C2	France; Michel Duboille; Jacques Rousseau	1013.0	France; Claude Neveu; Roger Paris	1146.6	Czechoslovakia; Jan Brzák-Felix; Bohumil Kudrna	1280.7
C2 team	France; Michel Duboille & Jacques Rousseau; Claude Neveu & Roger Paris; René Gavinet & Simon Gavinet	3738.8	Czechoslovakia; Jan Brzák-Felix & Bohumil Kudrna; Václav Nič & Miroslav Drastík; Jan Šulc & Karel Koníček	5090.6	-	

==== Kayak ====
Event	Gold	Points	Silver	Points	Bronze	Points
Folding K1	Othmar Eiterer (AUT)	594.1	Hans Frühwirth (AUT)	601.7	Werner Zimmermann (SUI)	661.5
Folding K1 team	Switzerland; Werner Zimmermann; Jean Engler; Eduard Kunz	2355.5	Austria; Hans Frühwirth; Rudolf Pillwein; Josef Danek	2606.9	Czechoslovakia; Bohuslav Fiala; Alvin Jeschke; Jiří Valeš	3374.1

=== Women's ===
==== Kayak ====
Event	Gold	Points	Silver	Points	Bronze	Points
Folding K1	Heidi Pillwein (AUT)	408.8	Fritzi Schwingl (AUT)	435.1	Gerti Pertlwieser (AUT)	508.3
Folding K1 team	Austria; Heidi Pillwein; Fritzi Schwingl; Gerti Pertlwieser	1352.2	Switzerland; Marie Fromaigeat; Elsa Oderholz; Janine Maulet	3989.9	-	

== Medals table ==
Rank	Nation	Gold	Silver	Bronze	Total
1	France (FRA)	4	2	0	6
2	Austria (AUT)	3	3	1	7
3	Switzerland (SUI)	1	1	1	3
4	Czechoslovakia (TCH)	0	2	3	5
Totals (4 entries)		8	8	5	21
