= Sergey Chumakov (canoeist) =

Soviet sprint canoer (1928–1994)

Sergey Ivanovich Chumakov (Russian: Сeргeй Иванович Чумаков; 20 March 1928— 17 July 1994) was a Soviet sprint canoer who competed in the early 1950s. He was eliminated in the heats of the C-2 1000 m event at the 1952 Summer Olympics in Helsinki.
