= Miroslav Drastík =

Medal record

Men's canoe slalom

Representing Czechoslovakia

World Championships
Silver medal – second place	1949 Geneva	C-2 team

Miroslav Drastík is a retired slalom canoeist who competed for Czechoslovakia in the late 1940s. He won a silver medal in the C-2 team event at the 1949 ICF Canoe Slalom World Championships in Geneva.
