= Jeschke =

Jeschke is a surname. Notable people with the surname include:

- Alvin Jeschke, Czechoslovak canoeist
- Andreas Jeschke (born 1966), German footballer and manager
- Karl Jeschke (1890–?), German SS officer
- Marta Jeschke (born 1986), Polish sprinter
- Norman Jeschke (born 1979), German pair skater
- Sabina Jeschke (born 1968), German scientist
- Wolfgang Jeschke (1936–2015), German writer
