= Valentin Orischenko =

Soviet sprint canoer

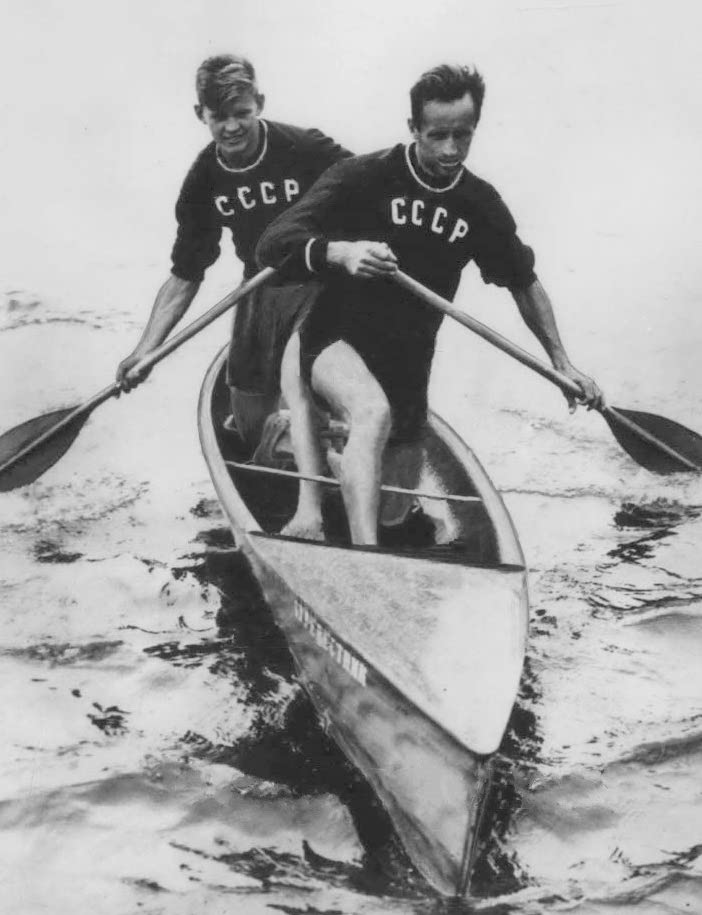
- Perevozchikov and Orischenko (left) in 1952

Personal information
- Born: 10 July 1922

Sport
- Sport: Canoe racing
- Coached by: Valentin Volodin

Valentin Vasilyevich Orishchenko (Russian: Валентин Васильевич Орищенко; born 10 July 1922) was a Soviet sprint canoer who competed in the early 1950s. Together with Nikolay Perevozchikov he finished fourth in the C-2 10000 m event at the 1952 Summer Olympics in Helsinki. Orishchenko was a World War II veteran. Before taking up canoe racing he trained in gymnastics.
