= Taimen (kayak) =

Russian model of boat

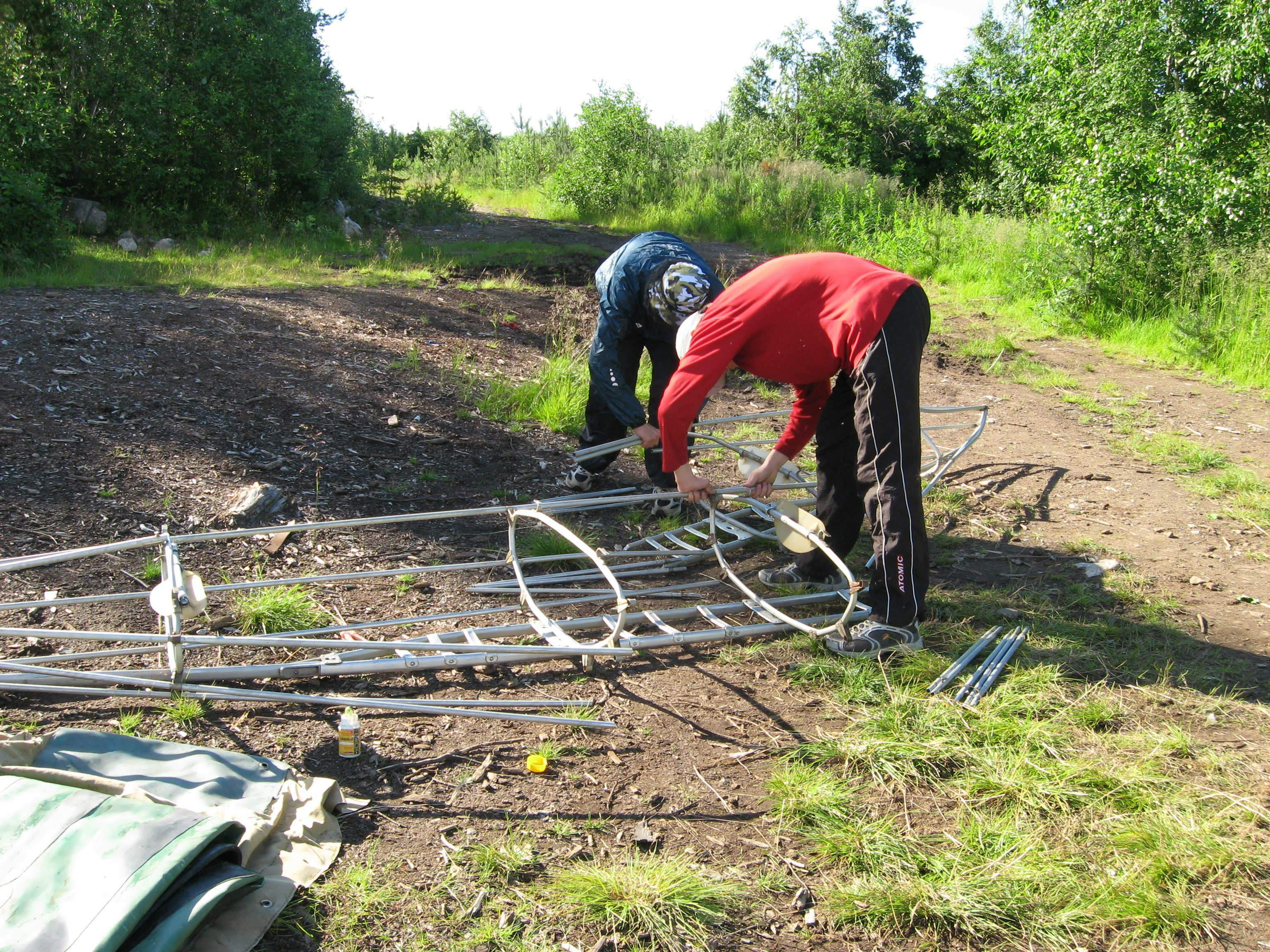
Assembly of Taimen-3 kayak

The Taimen is the most popular and common model of a Russian folding kayak. It was and still is a very common boat in its country of origin and has been exported to other nations around the world. The Taimen kayaks have been produced in a military factory in Moscow since 1975, even though the design changed only slightly. It is named after the taimen, a large species of trout found in Russia and Mongolia.
