= Teppo Salmisaari =

Finnish canoeist

Teppo Salmisaari (19 June 1924, Tampere - 9 July 2006) was a Finnish sprint canoeist who competed in the early 1950s. He finished ninth in the C-2 10000 m event at the 1952 Summer Olympics in Helsinki.
