= Oldřich Lomecký =

Medal record

Men's canoe sprint

World Championships
Bronze medal – third place	1950 Copenhagen	C-2 10000 m

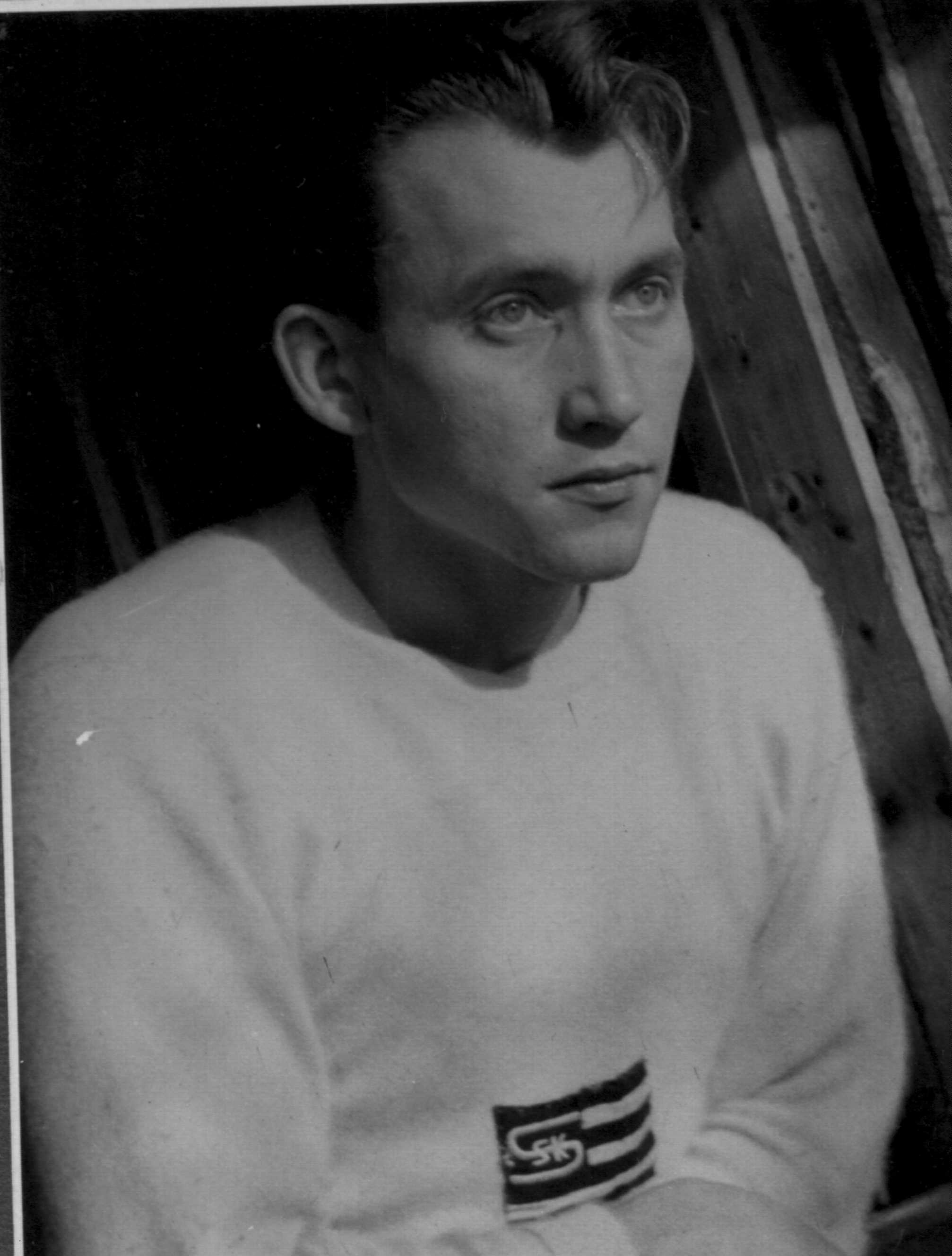

Oldřich Lomecký (5 September 1920 in Prague – 17 April 2011) was a Czech sprint canoer who competed for Czechoslovakia in the early 1930s. He won a bronze medal in the C-2 10000 m event at the 1950 ICF Canoe Sprint World Championships in Copenhagen.

Lomecký also finished sixth in the C-2 10000 m event at the 1952 Summer Olympics in Helsinki.
