= Bohuslav Fiala (canoeist) =

Medal record

Men's canoe slalom

Representing Czechoslovakia

World Championships
Silver medal – second place	1951 Steyr	C-2 team
Bronze medal – third place	1949 Geneva	Folding K-1 team

Bohuslav Fiala is a retired slalom canoeist who competed for Czechoslovakia in the late 1940s and the early 1950s. He won two medals at the ICF Canoe Slalom World Championships with a silver (C-2 team: 1951) and a bronze (Folding K-1 team: 1949).
