= Michel Duboille =

French slalom canoeist (1924–2020)

Medal record

Men's canoe slalom

Representing France

World Championships
Gold medal – first place	1949 Geneva	C-2
Gold medal – first place	1949 Geneva	C-2 team

Michel Duboille (1924–2020) was a French slalom canoeist.

== Career ==
Duboille competed in the late 1940s. He won two gold medals at the 1949 ICF Canoe Slalom World Championships in Geneva, earning them in the C-2 and C-2 team events.
