= Rune Blomqvist =

Swedish sprint canoer

Rune Blomqvist (6 March 1925 – 22 October 2010) was a Swedish sprint canoeist who competed in the early 1950s. At the 1952 Summer Olympics in Helsinki, he finished eighth in the C-2 10000 m event while being eliminated in the heats of the C-2 1000 m event.
