= Rudolf Pillwein =

Austrian canoeist

Sport
- Sport: Kayaking
- Event: Folding kayak
Medal record
Men's slalom canoeing
Representing Austria
World Championships
Gold medal – first place	1951 Steyr	Folding K-1 team
Silver medal – second place	1949 Geneva	Folding K-1 team
Silver medal – second place	1951 Steyr	Folding K-1

Rudolf Pillwein is an Austrian retired slalom canoeist who competed in the 1940s and the 1950s. He won three medals at the ICF Canoe Slalom World Championships with a gold (Folding K-1 team: 1951) and two silvers (Folding K-1: 1951, Folding K-1 team: 1949).
