= Paul Huguet =

French canoeist

Medal record

Men's canoe slalom

Representing France

World Championships
Gold medal – first place	1949 Geneva	C-1 team
Silver medal – second place	1949 Geneva	C-1

Paul Huguet is a French retired slalom canoeist who competed in the late 1940s and the early 1950s. He won two medals at the 1949 ICF Canoe Slalom World Championships in Geneva with a gold in the C-1 team event and a silver in the C-1 event.
