= Jiří Purchart =

Medal record

Men's canoe slalom

Representing Czechoslovakia

World Championships
Silver medal – second place	1949 Geneva	C-1 team

Jiří Purchart is a retired slalom canoeist who competed for Czechoslovakia in the late 1940s. He won a silver medal in the C-1 team event at the 1949 ICF Canoe Slalom World Championships in Geneva.
