= Lindback =

- Anders Lindbäck (born 1988), Swedish professional ice hockey goaltender
- Antonio Lindbäck (born 1985), Brazilian motorcycle speedway rider
- Peter Lindbäck (born 1955), Finish governor of the Åland Islands
- Harry Lindbäck (born 1926), Swedish canoer

== See also ==
- Lindback Award, attributed by the Lindback Foundation
