= Arthur Johnson (canoeist) =

Canadian canoeist

Arthur Leonard Johnson (July 1, 1921 – September 12, 2003) was a Canadian sprint canoeist who competed in the early 1950s. He finished eighth in the C-2 1000 m event at the 1952 Summer Olympics in Helsinki.
