= Gerald Tomlinson =

American journalist

- Born: January 24, 1933; Elmira, New York
- Died: June 24, 2006 (aged 73); Lake Hopatcong, New Jersey
- Education: Marietta College; Columbia Law School

Gerald Arthur Tomlinson (January 24, 1933 – June 24, 2006) was a crime writer and editor. He wrote about sports, crime and New Jersey topics. Over twenty-five of his stories appeared in Ellery Queen's Mystery Magazine and Alfred Hitchcock's Mystery Magazine. He became a member of Mystery Writers of America in 1993. He was a member of the Society for American Baseball Research and he served on the Publications Committee from 1990 through 1991.

== Biography ==
He was born in Elmira, New York on January 24, 1933. He attended Southside High School and graduated in 1951. He received his B.A. from Marietta College and he later attended Columbia Law School. He then became an English teacher. He started work in publishing at Harcourt Brace and then Holt, Rinehart and Winston. He became an executive editor at Silver Burdett in Morristown, New Jersey. He died while living in Lake Hopatcong, New Jersey, on June 24, 2006.

== Publications ==
- Seven Jersey Murders; ISBN 1-4134-1206-8
- Fatal Tryst: Who Killed the Minister and the Choir Singer?; ISBN 0-917125-09-6
- New Jersey? What Exit?: 300 Questions and Answers About People, Places, and Events in the Garden State; ISBN 0-917125-05-3
- The New Jersey Book of Lists; ISBN 0-917125-01-0
- Speaker's Treasury of Political Stories, Anecdotes and Humor; ISBN 0-13-829730-4
- How to Do Baseball Research; ISBN 0-910137-83-8
- The Baseball Research Handbook; ISBN 0-910137-29-3
- Speaker's Treasury of Sports Anecdotes, Stories and Humor; ISBN 1-56731-109-1
- The West Virginia Book of Lists; ISBN 0-917125-03-7
- On a Field of Black; ISBN 0-8424-0151-2
- The 107th New York Regiment at Antietam; ISBN 0-917125-11-8
- Accountant's Complete Model Letter Book; ISBN 0-13-001199-1
- Treasury of Religious Quotations; ISBN 0-13-276411-3
- School Administrator's Complete Letter Book; ISBN 0-7879-6589-8
- Managing Smart: A No-Gimmick Handbook of Management Techniques That Work; ISBN 0-669-12654-3
- Murdered in Jersey
