= Dezső Pattantyús-Ábrahám =

Hungarian politician

Noble Dezső Pattantyús-Ábrahám de Dancka
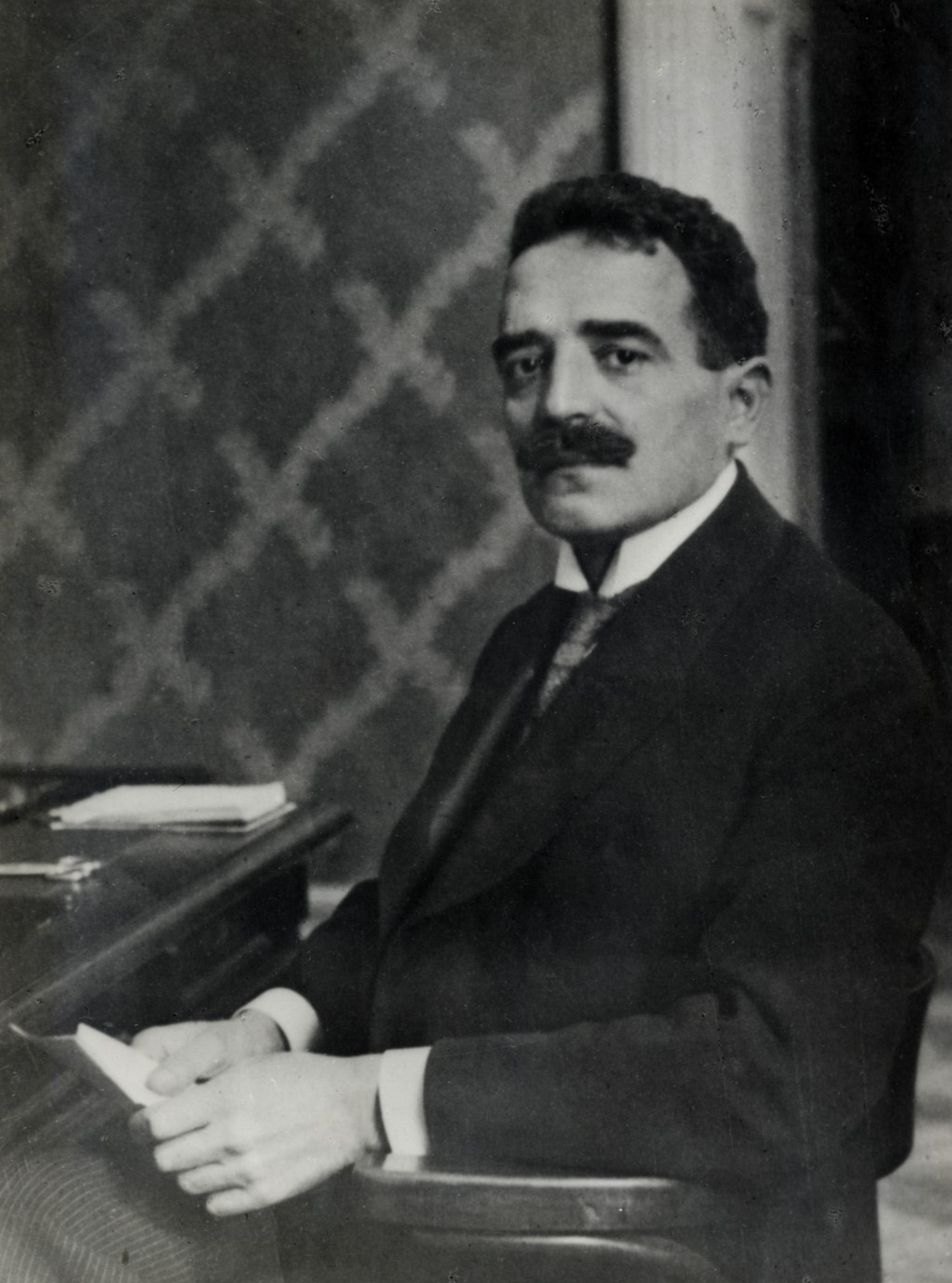
- Pattantyús-Ábrahám in 1918

Prime Minister of the Counter-Revolutionary Government
- In office 12 July 1919 – 12 August 1919
- Preceded by: Gyula Károlyi
- Succeeded by: Position abolished

Personal details
- Born: 10 July 1875 Ungvár, Ung County, Kingdom of Hungary, Austria-Hungary (today Uzhhorod, Ukraine)
- Died: 25 July 1973 (aged 98) Budapest, Hungary
- Party: Party of Independence and '48 (1906–1924); Hungarian Freedom Party (1946–1947); Independent Hungarian Democratic Party (1947–1949); Hungarian Freedom Party (1956)
- Spouse(s): Piroska Rickl (1902–1908); Anna Matild Rucsinszki (1925–1973)
- Profession: politician, lawyer

Dezső Pattantyús-Ábrahám de Dancka (10 July 1875 – 25 July 1973) was a conservative Hungarian politician who served as Prime Minister and temporary Minister of Finance of the second counter-revolutionary government in Szeged for one month in 1919. His government commissioned Miklós Horthy to Supreme Commander of the National Army.

== Biography ==
He was born to an ancient noble family. The Pattantyús family used the "Ábrahám" name from the 17th century. Michael I Apafi, Prince of Transylvania donated to them the "danckai" title of nobility. His parents were László Ábrahám and Erzsébet Király. His younger brother was the writer Ernő Pattantyús-Ábrahám.

He was a member of the Diet of Hungary between 1906 and 1918 as representative of Karcag. He was appointed state secretary of the Ministry of Justice in the cabinet of Mihály Károlyi. He negotiated about the national minorities' emancipation with the Romanian national leaders in Arad as a member of the committee which was led by Oszkár Jászi.

During the Hungarian Soviet Republic he moved to Szeged. He was the Prime Minister of the third counter-revolutionary government. His government commissioned Miklós Horthy to Supreme Commander of the National Army. During the Károly Huszár cabinet he served as state secretary of the Ministry of the Interior. After that he temporarily retired from politics. Pattantyús-Ábrahám worked as a lawyer between 1920 and 1944. He entered the elections repeatedly unsuccessfully in these times. In November 1944 the Arrow Cross Party members interned to Sopronkőhida then Germany. He returned home in 1945.

After his returning he founded the Hungarian Freedom Party. He became a member of the National Assembly again in 1947, after an almost thirty-year gap. According to sources he was branded as a right-wing extremist and was excluded from the party in 1949. He resigned from his parliamentary seat. He retired from politics in this same year. He was interned to Tarcal in 1951. He was overheared and warned in 1957, because he took part in the re-foundation of the Freedom Party during the Hungarian Revolution of 1956. He worked as a lawyer until 1958. He had connections with American and English diplomats, as a result the police authorities warned him again in 1967. Two years before his death the Hungarian intelligence agencies stopped his observation. Dezső Pattantyús-Ábrahám died in Budapest at the age of 98.

Political offices
Preceded by Gyula Károlyi	Prime Minister of the Counter-Government of Hungary; 1919	Succeeded by —
Records
Preceded by Émile Reuter	Oldest living state leader 14 February 1973 – 25 July 1973	Succeeded by Federico Páez
