= John Haas =

American canoeist

John Able Haas (January 9, 1909 – July 5, 1992) was an American sprint canoer who competed in the 1950s. Competing in two Summer Olympics, he earned his best finish of fifth in the C-2 10000 m event at Helsinki in 1952.
