= Bohuslav Karlík =

Czechoslovak canoeist (1908–1996)

Medal record

Representing Czechoslovakia

Men's canoe sprint

Olympic Games
Silver medal – second place	1936 Berlin	C-1 1000 m

Canoe Sprint World Championships
Gold medal – first place	1938 Vaxholm	C-2 10000 m
Silver medal – second place	1938 Vaxholm	C-2 1000 m
Bronze medal – third place	1950 Copenhagen	C-2 10000 m

Men's canoe slalom

Canoe Slalom World Championships
Silver medal – second place	1949 Geneva	C-1 team

Bohuslav Karlík (November 25, 1908 – September 29, 1996) was a Czechoslovak flatwater and slalom canoeist who competed from the late 1930s to the early 1950s. Competing in two Summer Olympics, he won the silver in the C-1 1000 m event at Berlin in 1936.

Karlík won a complete set of medals at the ICF Canoe Sprint World Championships with a gold in the C-2 10000 m (1938), a silver in the C-2 1000 m (1938), and a bronze in the C-2 10000 m events (1950).

In canoe slalom, he won a silver medal in the C-1 team event at the 1949 ICF Canoe Slalom World Championships in Geneva.

A native of Prague, Karlík teamed up with fellow canoeist Jan Brzák-Felix in 1955 to paddle the 118 miles (190 km) of the Vltava from České Budějovice to Prague in 20 hours.
