= Kinga Choszcz =

Polish travel writer

Kinga Choszcz, better known as Kinga Freespirit (10 April 1973 in Gdańsk, Poland – 9 June 2006 in Ghana), was a well-known Polish traveler and travel writer.

Kinga's first solitary journey led her to India and Nepal overland. Soon after she met her life partner Radosław Siuda (better known as Chopin), and together they hitch-hiked around the world for 5 years. Kinga then published her book Led by Destiny and followed her heart's call to go to Africa. Eight months later she died after contracting cerebral malaria in Ghana.

== Travels ==
In 1998 Kinga and Chopin started a world hitchhiking trip after coming to the American continent with only 583 dollars in their pocket. They returned home after five years of travels through South America, North America, Australia and Asia where they have been relying solely on the kindness of other people. Kinga edited her journals and stories posted on their travel webpage into a book which was then published in Polish and later translated into English under the title Led By Destiny. With stories like hitchhiking a plane in Alaska, getting a free yacht ride from New Zealand to the islands of Vanuatu, hitching a tractor in Tibet, often staying with people in their homes, her book was first of all an account of how one can find open and ready-to-help people all around the world.

After the book was published, Kinga toured Europe visiting various travelers meetings, giving speeches and selling her book. In late 2005 she embarked on a hitchhiking journey through Africa where she then went alone. Her adventures posted on her website were followed by many people. As an example, on May 12, 2006, she wrote:

[...] I finally had to take a motorcycle bush taxi that brought me to the Liberian customs and immigration building by the little bridge in the jungle. 'Is that Ivorian immigration building there?' -- I asked pointing to the other side of the bridge. 'Used to be. It's the rebel base now.' -- they told me. But having got as far as this I had to go on. Rebels, however, turned out to be quite kind, and as there was no other transportation there, they gave me a ride to town in one of their vehicles dashing in a convoy through the jungle.

In early June 2006 a note was posted on her webpage by her partner Chopin reading that she had contracted cerebral malaria and was lying unconscious in a military hospital in Accra, Ghana. Kinga died five days later on June 9, 2006, aged 33. Her death evoked many comments and discussions within the hitch-hiking and travelers communities.

In 2007 Kinga's friends and family decided to honor her memory by creating a foundation that would support and help educate more kids in that part of Ghana where Kinga finished her earthly journey. That's how Freespirit Foundation came to live.

== Personal life ==
Kinga was a keen photographer and an active blogger.

She was a vegetarian for about 12 years and a vegan for the last 8–9 years of her life.
