= Matti Havulinna =

Finnish sprint canoer

Matti Havulinna (3 May 1931 – 29 June 2012) was a Finnish sprint canoeist who competed in the early 1950s. He was eliminated in the heats of the C-2 1000 m event at the 1952 Summer Olympics in Helsinki. He was born in Tampere.
