= Ferdinand Boogaerts =

Belgian footballer

Personal information
- Date of birth: 25 February 1921
- Place of birth: Zaventem, Belgium
- Date of death: 30 June 2006 (aged 85)
- Position: Goalkeeper

International career
Years	Team	Apps	(Gls)
1951–1952	Belgium	6	(0)

Ferdinand Boogaerts (25 February 1921 – 30 June 2006) was a Belgian footballer. He played in six matches for the Belgium national football team from 1951 to 1952.
