= Jorma Kulo =

Finnish canoeist

Jorma Kulo (30 October 1923 in Tampere – 23 June 2006) was a Finnish sprint canoeist who competed in the early 1950s. He finished ninth in the C-2 10000 m event at the 1952 Summer Olympics in Helsinki.
