= Seema Aissen Weatherwax =

American photographer (1905–2006)

Seema Aissen Weatherwax (August 25, 1905 – June 25, 2006) was a Jewish-American photographer born in the Russian Empire.

Born in Chernihiv, Russian Empire to Jewish parents, Avram and Reva Aissen, Seema was the middle child of three daughters. The family emigrated to England in 1913, then to Boston in 1922, where young Seema found her first job working in a photofinishing lab. She pursued this craft in Boston, New Jersey, New Mexico, California and Tahiti, but she was 95 when she first exhibited her own photographs to the public.

In Los Angeles in the 1930s she joined the Film and Photo League, began her lifelong work for racial justice, and formed enduring friendships with artists and political activists including Edward Weston, Imogen Cunningham and Woody Guthrie. She assisted Ansel Adams in Yosemite, becoming a close friend of Adams' family. She left Yosemite to marry Jack Weatherwax in 1942, working as a photo technician to support his writing while joining in his left activism in Los Angeles. In 1984 they moved to Santa Cruz, California, where her husband died three weeks after their arrival. After a year of grieving and contemplation, Seema Weatherwax stepped into public life in her own right. Wanting to share her personal collection of art and photographs, she held benefit shows, joined the NAACP and WILPF, was elected to the boards of those two organizations, and was soon well known in Santa Cruz.

On the eve of her 94th birthday, she decided that she wanted to do two things before she died; print some of her old negatives and have a new love. Having reflected on the reasons for having put her own creative work in the background, she revised her life story, using work created on the margins of the great photography of the mid-20th century to step from a conventional women's role into center stage.

In 2005, Seema Weatherwax had her fifth public show of her photographs, at Special Collections at the University of California, Santa Cruz, then celebrated her 100th birthday and the release of her biography, Seema’s Show: A Life on the Left, by Sara Halprin, published by the University of New Mexico Press.

== Resources ==
- Tapes and transcripts of interviews for the Weatherwax biography are deposited at Special Collections, University of California, Santa Cruz, which also holds the bulk of the Weatherwax collection of photographs. Supplementary photographs from the Weatherwax collection are deposited with Special Collections, Stanford University.
- Jack Weatherwax's papers are held by the Smithsonian Institution.
- See an exhibit of some of Seema Weatherwax's photographs.
