= Ernő Söptei =

Hungarian canoeist

Ernő Söptei (12 February 1925 – 15 January 1999) was a Hungarian sprint canoeist who competed in the early 1950s. He finished seventh in the C-2 10000 m event at the 1952 Summer Olympics in Helsinki.

Söptei died in Toronto.
