= Jean Laudet =

French canoeist (1930–2025)

Olympic medal record

Men's Canoe sprint

Representing France
Gold medal – first place	1952 Helsinki	C-2 10000 m

Jean Laudet (5 August 1930 – 20 December 2025) was a French sprint canoeist who competed in the early 1950s. He won a gold medal in the C-2 10000 m event at the 1952 Summer Olympics in Helsinki. Laudet was born in Nevers on 5 August 1930, and died on 20 December 2025, at the age of 95.

== Sources ==
- Jean Laudet at Olympedia
