= Priit Kolbre =

Estonian diplomat

Priit Kolbre (17 February 1956 in Tallinn – 19 June 2006 Vantaa, Finland) was an Estonian diplomat.

In 1991 he graduated from Estonian School of Diplomacy. Since 1990 he worked for Estonian Foreign Ministry.

He has been Ambassador of Estonia to Holy See. 2005-2006 he was Ambassador of Estonia to Finland.

In 2001 he was awarded with Order of the National Coat of Arms, V class.

On 19 June 2006, Kolbre was found dead in a vehicle with a running engine at Helsinki Airport in Vantaa, Finland, aged 50. The cause of death was determined to be heart related.
