= Jacques des Rousseaux =

French painter (1600–1638)

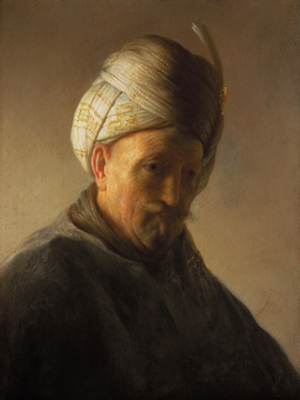
Man in Turban, painting formerly attributed to Rousseaux and recently attributed to Rembrandt

Jacques des Rousseaux (1600 – 1638), was a Baroque painter active in Leiden. He was born in Torcoing, which at the time was part of the Spanish Netherlands.

== Biography ==
According to the RKD he was a pupil of Rembrandt in Leiden from 1630 onwards. He is known for genre works in the manner of Rembrandt.
