= Robert Ross (CEO) =

Robert Ross (1920–2006) was the founder and leader of the Muscular Dystrophy Association in 1950. Ross was CEO for 44 years until his death in 2006. The Muscular Dystrophy Association is an organization which combats muscular dystrophy and diseases of the nervous system and muscular system in general by funding research, providing medical and community services, and educating health professionals and the general public. The work of Robert Ross was appreciated by many and it was he who persuaded Jerry Lewis to undertake a yearly telethon to raise money for muscular dystrophy. Starting in February 1999, Ross wrote a column for MDA, titled The Ross Report—the final submission to The Ross Report was made in May 2006, one month before Ross's death.

Ross died in June 2006 aged 86, following complications of surgery to repair a broken hip.

== Named after him ==
- Asteroid 6641 Bobross
