= Donald Reilly =

American cartoonist

Donald Reilly (November 11, 1933 – June 18, 2006) was a cartoonist best known for his long association with The New Yorker magazine. His style of drawing was to sketch quickly to achieve a feeling of spontaneity and to use his cartoons to make a social commentary on the times. Interviewed for the 1975 book, The Art in Cartooning, Reilly said, "The essence of the so-called 'gag' cartoon is its simplicity and directness."

== Formative years and family ==
Donald William Reilly was born in Scranton, Pennsylvania on November 11, 1933, and began drawing for The New Yorker in 1964. Inspired by the animated fantasy film, Gulliver's Travels, he began to draw at the age of five. A trumpet student in high school, he became a lifelong jazz enthusiast who performed for weddings and parties as an adult when not working at his day job as a cartoon artist. After earning his Bachelor's degree in English at Muhlenberg College in Allentown in 1955, he enlisted in the United States Navy and served until 1957. He then earned his art certificate from Cooper Union in New York City in 1963.

His second wife was Kathleen (Collins) Reilly.

== Career ==
Reilly created 1,107 cartoons and sixteen front page covers for The New Yorker magazine. His work had also appeared in Collier's, the Harvard Business Review, Look, Mad, and Playboy.

In 1984, the town council of Garrett Park, Maryland voted to install a sign on a troublesome intersection, with the text "At Least Slow Down (formerly STOP)" (based on one of Reilly's New Yorker cartoons).

== Death ==
Reilly died from cancer at the age of seventy-two in Norwalk, Connecticut on June 18, 2006.
