= Donald Hawgood =

Canadian canoeist

Olympic medal record

Men's canoe sprint
Silver medal – second place	1952 Helsinki	C-2 10000 m

Donald T. Hawgood (March 20, 1917 – July 8, 2010) was a Canadian sprint canoer who competed in the early 1950s. He won a silver medal in the C-2 10000 m event at the 1952 Summer Olympics in Helsinki.
