= Bent Peder Rasch =

Danish canoeist

Olympic medal record

Men's canoe sprint

Representing Denmark

Olympic Games
Gold medal – first place	1952 Helsinki	C-2 1000 m

Bent Peder Benjamin Rasch (31 May 1934 in Copenhagen, Denmark – 26 November 1988 in Vancouver, Canada) was a Danish sprint canoeist who competed in the early 1950s. At the 1952 Summer Olympics in Helsinki, he won a gold in the C-2 1000 m event.

A native of Copenhagen, Rasch emigrated to Canada where he died in Vancouver in 1988.
