= Edward S. Hamilton =

American army officer (1917–2006)

Hamilton as a United States Military Academy cadet c. 1939

Edward Smith Hamilton (March 21, 1917 – June 30, 2006) was an American army officer during World War II, and later a Central Intelligence Agency (CIA) operative in China, East Germany and Turkey.

Hamilton graduated from the United States Military Academy in 1939. He went ashore at Normandy two days after D-Day in command of a battalion in the 90th Infantry Division. After defending a key bridge, he was awarded the Silver Star on August 5, 1944. On September 8, 1944, he and his troops disabled 4 German tanks and captured 17 soldiers; for his heroism, he was awarded the Distinguished Service Cross. He lost his left eye two days later in a battle. He was awarded three Purple Hearts and a Bronze Star .

In 1950, he began working for the CIA, leading attacks from Taiwan against the mainland of China. The book Raiders of the China Coast by Frank Holober describes these adventures. He later performed undercover counterintelligence work in East Germany and Turkey, up to 1959.

France awarded him the Legion of Honor in 2005. Hamilton died in 2006 in Annandale, VA, of pneumonia.
