= Jacques Rousseau (canoeist) =

French slalom canoeist

Medal record

Men's canoe slalom

Representing France

World Championships
Gold medal – first place	1949 Geneva	C-2
Gold medal – first place	1949 Geneva	C-2 team

Jacques Rousseau (c. 1925 – 2009) was a French slalom canoeist who competed in the late 1940s. He won two gold medals at the 1949 ICF Canoe Slalom World Championships in Geneva, earning them in the C-2 event and the C-2 team event.
