= Jake Copass =

American poet

Cowboy poet Jake Copass

Jake Copass (April 18, 1920 – June 8, 2006) was a cowboy poet who lived in the Santa Ynez Valley. He had been working as a wrangler at the Alisal Guest Ranch in Solvang, California since 1946.

A native of Texas, he was shocked when he saw the valley. "Green grass in winter?" he says. "I had never seen that before. So I decided to stay. This was real cowboy country back then." Copass bought and sold cattle up and down the coast and did occasional movie work over the decades.

Each couple of years, his family would visit him up at his ranch. He always kept in touch with the people he knew.

He saw an opportunity to reinforce children's value systems by talking about honesty and the cowboy way, and helping them to understand the ethics cowboys live by. Jake recently explained, "When you're young, you never feel like you have anything to offer anyone. Then you find out your own experiences are interesting to others."

A story-telling, poetry-reading cowboy treasure, Jake Copass has performed at cowboy poetry gatherings all over the West. He has a book of poetry, It Don't Hurt to Laugh, published by Olive Press, and a memoir entitled, I'll Be Satisfied.

Copass died on June 8, 2006, following a brief illness from leukemia. His funeral was held a week later at the Alisal Guest Ranch ().
