= Harry Lindbäck =

Swedish canoeist

Harry Lindbäck (19 December 1926 – 9 August 2010) was a Swedish sprint canoer who competed in the early 1950s. At the 1952 Summer Olympics in Helsinki, he finished eighth in the C-2 10000 m event while being eliminated in the heats of the C-2 1000 m event.
