= Wilfried Soltau =

German canoeist

Olympic medal record

Men's canoe sprint
Bronze medal – third place	1952 Helsinki	C-2 1000 m
Bronze medal – third place	1952 Helsinki	C-2 10000 m

Wilfried Soltau (17 June 1912 – 27 September 1995) was a West German sprint canoer who competed in the 1950s. Competing in two Summer Olympics, he won two bronze medals at London in 1952, earning them in the C-2 1000 m and C-2 10000 m events.
