= Sea sock =

Kayaking equipment

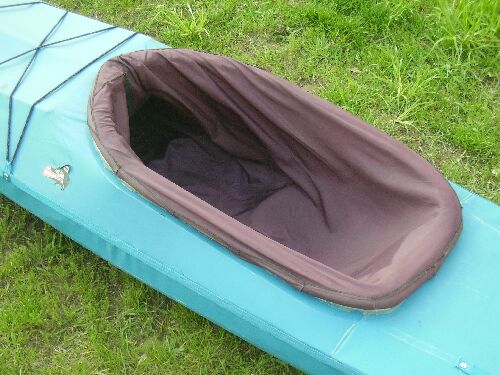
Sea sock installed in a kayak

A sea sock is a piece of safety equipment used in sea kayaking. It is a large waterproof bag, fitting the lower body of a kayaker, that is placed inside the kayak and attached tightly all around the rim of the cockpit. The paddler sits inside the sea sock and fits the sprayskirt over the sea sock and cockpit coaming as usual.

A sea sock is used to keep a kayak from filling up with water in case of implosion of the sprayskirt or emergency exit of the paddler from the kayak. When correctly installed only the sea sock will be filled reducing the quantity of water to be bailed out after the paddler re-entry while maintaining flotation and stability of the hull. In some situations, it is possible to empty the water in the sea sock by turning it inside out.

Though it is used in kayaks of various shapes and sizes, it is almost a compulsory accessory for paddlers with high-volume kayaks that have no bulkheads, where the quantity of water filling the kayak could be unmanageable and in "skin-on-frame" kayaks where the construction method makes the adoption of bulkheads impractical. It should be used in conjunction with flotation bags adding an extra level of security.
