= Lundbäck =

Lundbäck is a Swedish surname. Notable people with the surname include:

- Lena Carlzon-Lundbäck (born 1954), Swedish cross-country skier
- Robin Lundbäck (born 1994), Swedish singer/songwriter, stage name "Boy In Space"
- Sven-Åke Lundbäck (born 1948), Swedish cross-country skier, husband of Lena
