= Egon Drews =

German canoeist (1926–2011)

Olympic medal record

Men's canoe sprint
Bronze medal – third place	1952 Helsinki	C-2 1000 m
Bronze medal – third place	1952 Helsinki	C-2 10000 m

Egon Drews (1 June 1926 – 13 January 2011) was a West German flatwater canoer who competed in the 1950s. Competing in two Summer Olympics, he won two bronze medals at Helsinki in 1952, earning them in the C-2 1000 m and C-2 10000 m events.
