= Frank Krick =

American canoeist

Frank Krick (June 30, 1910 – May 5, 1982) was an American sprint canoer who competed in the 1950s. Competing in two Summer Olympics, he earned his best finish of fifth in the C-2 10000 m event at Helsinki in 1952.
