= Engelbert Lulla =

Austrian canoeist (1929–2022)

Medal record

Men's canoe sprint

World Championships
Gold medal – first place	1954 Mâcon	C-2 1000 m

Engelbert Lulla (25 September 1929 – 5 October 2022) was an Austrian canoe sprinter who competed in the early 1950s. He won a gold medal in the C-2 1000 m event at the 1954 ICF Canoe Sprint World Championships in Mâcon. Lulla also finished sixth in the C-2 1000 m event at the 1952 Summer Olympics in Helsinki. Lulla died in Klosterneuburg on 5 October 2022, at the age of 93.

== Sources ==
- Evans, Hilary; Gjerde, Arild; Heijmans, Jeroen; Mallon, Bill; et al. "Engelbert Lulla". Olympics at Sports-Reference.com. Sports Reference LLC. Archived from the original on 18 April 2020.
