= Edward Craig Morris =

Edward Craig Morris (October 7, 1939 – June 14, 2006) was an American archaeologist who was best known for his Inca expeditions and creating a modern understanding of the Inca civilization. Morris was dean of science and chair of Department of Anthropology at the American Museum of Natural History, a member of the National Academy of Sciences, a member of the American Academy of Arts and Sciences. The New York Times called Morris "a towering figure in Inca expeditions" and said that he "helped transform modern knowledge of the Inca civilization". The National Academy of Sciences said that his studies became classics of the field.

== Chronology ==
- 1939: born on October 7 in Murray, Kentucky
- 1961: bachelor's degree in psychology and philosophy, magna cum laude, Vanderbilt University
- 1967: Ph.D., the University of Chicago
- 1967–1968: Assistant Professor, Northern Illinois University
- 1968–1975: Assistant Professor, Brandeis University
- 1975–1980: Assistant Curator of Anthropology, American Museum of Natural History, New York
- 1976: Visiting Associate Professor of Anthropology, Cornell University
- 1977: Visiting Professor of Archaeology, Universidad Nacional Mayor de San Marcos, Lima, Peru
- 1977–1992: Adjunct Professor, Cornell University
- 1983–1990: Chair, Department of Anthropology, American Museum of Natural History
- 1986: Visiting Professor of Anthropology, City University of New York Graduate Center
- 1989–1991: Guest Curator, "Art in the Age of Exploration (Inka Section)," National Gallery of Art
- 1992–1997: Adjunct Professor of Anthropology, Columbia University
- 1994–2005: Dean of Science, American Museum of Natural History
- 1998–2005: Vice-President, American Museum of Natural History
- 1980–2006: Curator of Anthropology, American Museum of Natural History
- 2006: Died June 14 in New York City
