= Finn Haunstoft =

Danish canoeist (1928–2008)

Olympic medal record

Men's canoe sprint

Representing Denmark

Olympic Games
Gold medal – first place	1952 Helsinki	C-2 1000 m

Finn Haunstoft (8 July 1928 – 12 May 2008) was a Danish sprint canoer who competed in the 1950s. Competing in two Summer Olympics, he won the gold in the C-2 1000 m event at Helsinki in 1952. He also won 4 Nordic and 10 Danish championships.
