= Jesus Fuertes =

Spanish painter (1938–2006)

Jesus Fuertes (Spanish: Jesús Fuertes Gomez; 14 April 1938 – 18 June 2006) was a Cubist painter, who was initiated into the world of art by Salvador Dalí, and was described as a "true genius" by Pablo Picasso. Fuertes often chose women and cats as his subject matter. Several of his well-known works involve the use of shades of blue, which earned him the nickname "Painter of Blue".

His paintings hang in such notable buildings as the Queen Sofia Art Museum in Madrid, the Beaux Arts Museum in Brussels, the Contemporary Art Museum in Vienna, the Pretoria Art Museum in South Africa and the São Paulo Museum of Modern Art in Brazil. His works have also been acquired by various celebrities and institutions, such as King Juan Carlos I and Queen Sofia of Spain, Princess Christina of the Netherlands, Prince Albert II of Belgium, Baron Benjamin de Rothschild, the Spanish Ambassador Miguel de Aldasoro, Jacqueline Onassis, Paloma Picasso, Yves Saint Laurent, Paco Rabanne, Francis Ford Coppola, Roman Polanski, Sylvester Stallone, Julio Iglesias, Mireille Mathieu, Sara Montiel, Charles Aznavour, Sacha Distel, Capital Bank founder and president Abel Holtz, Deutsche Bank, Phillips, Boehringer Ingelheim, Bayer, and Sabena Airlines.

== Early life ==
Fuertes was born in Madrid, Spain in 1938, during the Spanish Civil War to a Bohemian poet who moved in the same literary circles as poets Jorge Guillen and Pedro Salinas. War and political uncertainty in Spain forced the Fuertes family to seek political asylum in France. While in France his father met Pablo Picasso who, at that time, was involved with a group that helped Spanish artists and intellectuals adjust to life in exile. Fuertes' father began to frequent symposiums attended by Picasso and they quickly formed a friendship which would last for life. Fuertes' first exhibition was at the age of 15 at the Young European Painters Exhibition in Berlin, which awarded him the second place prize.

== Early influences ==
His first contact with the Surrealist world was made through Salvador Dalí, who introduced him to André Breton, the father of the Surrealist movement. However, Fuertes was receptive to other trends, movements, and quests, which attracted the attention of Pablo Picasso. The two developed an assiduous relationship, thus permitting Fuertes to research the roots of Cubism. This led him to paint his first neo-cubist canvas.

In 1957, he exhibited with Salvador Dalí, Joan Miró, Antoni Tàpies, and Pablo Picasso at the Bruxelles International Expo, Spanish Pavilion. In 1963, Fuertes left for Rome, where he won the first place prize for his painting Torneo Medieval, awarded by the Grand Prix de Rome for Painting and Sculpture. It was in Italy that he developed a friendship with Giorgio de Chirico, the master painter of metaphysical art, with whom, in 1965, he exhibited his work alongside notable constructivists and surrealists such as Balthus, Umberto Boccioni and Carlo Carra. Upon his return to Paris, Fuertes met Alechinsky. He would also meet regularly with Apel and other artists at the La Coupole Café on the Boulevard du Montparnasse. It was at these meetings that Fuertes began his friendship with the abstract painter, Viola.

In 1967, Dalí presented a Fuertes' exhibition at the Grévin Museum in Paris and, in the two years that followed, Fuertes exhibited along with Salvador Dalí, René Magritte, Francis Picabia, Paul Delvaux, Félix Labisse, Man Ray, Max Ernst, and others. After that, his paintings were extensively exhibited around Europe and in the United States.

== Later life ==
In 1979, Fuertes moved to São Paulo, Brazil, where he developed some coloring expressions – a true representation of one of the first forms of "tropical neo-cubism". In São Paulo he gained the respect and admiration of local modern-art collectors, museums, and the general public.

In 1996, Fuertes established a studio in Miami, Florida, where he lived until his death in June 2006, at the age of 68.

== Awards ==
- 1953 Second place prize at the Young European Painters Exposition in Berlin
- 1963 Grand Prix de Rome for Painting and Sculpture. First place prize for his painting "Torneo Medieval"

== Exhibitions ==
(List as per Artnet)

- 1953 - Young European Painters International Show, Berlin, Germany
- 1954 - Saya Gallery, Lille, France
- 1955 - Brachot Gallery, Bruxelles, Belgium
- 1956 - New Tendencies, Le Petite Gallery, Paris, France
- 1957 - Bateauivre Gallerie, Paris, France, with Bernard Buffet
- 1958 - Bruxelles International Expo, Spanish Pavilion, Exhibited with Salvador Dalí, Joan Miró, Antoni Tàpies and Pablo Picasso
- 1959 - Gallery at the Hotel Saint Regis, New York
- 1960 - Magnus Gallery, Perpignan, France
- 1961 - Escrigit Gallery, Amberes, Belgium
- 1962 - Euroart Gallery, Paris, France
- 1964 - Simon Swartz Gallery, Switzerland
- 1965 - Circo Gallery, Rome, Italy, with notable constructivists and Italian surrealists Baltazar Baltrus, Umberto Boccioni, De Chirico and Carlo Carra
- 1966 - Luigi Amasso Gallery, Boston, Massachusetts
- 1967 - Grévin Museum, Paris, France, exhibition presented by Salvador Dalí
- 1968 - Massey Museum, Tarbes, France with Salvador Dalí, René Magritte, Francis Picabia and others
- 1968 – San Antonio International Art Exhibition, San Antonio, Texas
- 1969 - Knokke Casino, Belgium, group exhibition with surrealists Magritte, Del Vaux, Labisse, Man Ray, Max Ernst and others
- 1972 - Katya Granoff Gallery, Paris, France
- 1974 - Naharro Gallery, Zaragoza, Spain
- 1976 - Sala Galderes, Barcelona, Spain
- 1977 - Luigi Amasso Gallery, Boston, Massachusetts
- 1980 – São Paulo Museum of Modern Art, São Paulo, Brazil
- 1981 - Museum of Belo Horizonte, Brazil
- 1984 - Spanish Embassy in Brasília, Brazil
- 1985 - Embassy Gallery, Miami, Florida
- 1987 - Halos Gallery, Marseille, France
- 1988 - Museum of Modern Art in Amsterdam, Netherlands
- 1989 - Clicler Gallery, Toronto, Canada
- 1990 - Gallery of the Hotel El Camino Real, Mexico City, Mexico
- 1991 - Art Miami, Miami, Florida
- 1992 - South Western Gallery, Miami, Florida
- 1993 - Osaka Gallery, Tokyo, Japan
- 1994 - Vanidades Gallery, Miami, Florida
- 1995 - Art Miami, Miami, Florida
- 2000 – Artelenium Gallery: Barcelona, Spain, with Miró and Picasso
- 2000 - New York, exhibition sponsored by Plácido Domingo and Mayor Giuliani
- 2003 – Reina Sofia Museum, Madrid, Spain, "Quijote in Miami" painting
