= Ernő Pattantyús-Ábrahám =

Hungarian journalist and writer

Ernő Pattantyús-Ábrahám de Dancka (15 March 1882, Debrecen - 7 May 1945, Budapest) was a Hungarian journalist and writer. During the Second World War he published many antifascist articles against the Nazi Germany. His older brother was Dezső Pattantyús-Ábrahám, a Hungarian politician and Prime Minister of the Counter-revolutionary Government during the Hungarian Soviet Republic.
