= Jan Brzák-Felix =

Czech canoeist (1912–1988)

Medal record

Men's canoe sprint

Representing Czechoslovakia

Olympic Games
Gold medal – first place	1936 Berlin	C-2 1000 m
Gold medal – first place	1948 London	C-2 1000 m
Silver medal – second place	1952 Helsinki	C-2 1000 m

Canoe Sprint World Championships
Gold medal – first place	1938 Vaxholm	C-2 10000 m
Gold medal – first place	1950 Copenhagen	C-2 1000 m
Gold medal – first place	1950 Copenhagen	C-2 10000 m
Silver medal – second place	1938 Vaxholm	C-2 1000 m

Men's canoe slalom

Representing Czechoslovakia

Canoe Slalom World Championships
Silver medal – second place	1949 Geneva	C-1 team
Silver medal – second place	1949 Geneva	C-2 team
Bronze medal – third place	1949 Geneva	C-1
Bronze medal – third place	1949 Geneva	C-2

Jan Brzák-Felix (6 April 1912, Prague – 15 July 1988, Prague) was a Czech slalom and sprint canoeist. He competed for Czechoslovakia from the mid-1930s to the early 1950s. Competing in three Summer Olympics, he won three medals in the C-2 1000 m event, including two golds (1936, 1948) and a silver (1952).

Brzák-Felix also won four medals at the ICF Canoe Sprint World Championships with three golds (C-2 1000 m: 1950, C-2 10000 m: 1938, 1950) and one silver (C-2 1000 m: 1938).

He also competed at the Geneva 1949 ICF Canoe Slalom World Championships and earned two silver medals (C-1 team, C-2 team) and two bronze medals (C-1, C-2).

In 1955, Brzák-Felix teamed up with 1936 C-1 1000 m silver medalist Bohuslav Karlík to paddle the 118 miles (189.9 km) of the Vltava from České Budějovice to Prague in 20 hours.
