= Folding kayak =

Light boat that is paddled

A folding kayak is a direct descendant of the original Inuit kayak made of animal skins stretched over frames made from wood and bones. A modern folder has a collapsible frame made of some combination of wood, aluminium and plastic, and a skin made of a tough fabric with a waterproof coating. Many have integral air chambers inside the hull, making them virtually unsinkable.

== History ==
=== First models ===
The first workable folding kayak was built by Alfred Heurich in 1905, a German architectural student. Heurich paddled his creation on the Isar River near Munich and took out a patent on the design, called the Delphin (German: dolphin), the following year. The Delphin had a bamboo frame with a sailcloth hull stretched over it. It could be folded up and carried in three bags, each weighing less than 4.5 kg (9.9 lb).

The folding kayak was made commercially successful by Johann Klepper, whose factory was at Rosenheim, Germany. Klepper kayaks were very popular for their compact size and ease of transport. Klepper's Faltboot was introduced in 1906, many years before hardshell boats were commercially produced. Oskar Speck undertook his seven-year journey from Germany to Australia in the 1930s using folding kayaks made and sponsored by another manufacturer, Pionier-Faltboot-Werft.

=== Second World War ===
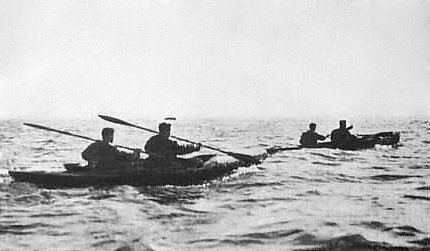
Cockles MK II

During the Second World War the British and Commonwealth special forces employed kayaks in the Mediterranean, European, and South-east Asian theatres. The special forces of the day (COPPS, Royal Marines Boom Patrol Detachment, etc.) had developed for them about a dozen state of the art kayaks which were given the codename Cockle. (Note: Kayaks in Europe were historically referred to as "canoes"; what most people think of as canoes were referred to as "Canadian canoes".) These Cockles ranged from the Mk 1 early frame-and fabric 'folbot' type to the four man boats made of aluminum alloy; most were 'collapsible' rather than being boats that could be completely disassembled, as with modern-day folding boats. The Mk 2 could be collapsed along its 15 ft length to just approximately 7 inches. This Mk 2 and its three-man Mk 2** were all of the same design and were designed by the same man—a Mr Fred Goatley. The Cockle Mk II was used by the RMBPD in Operation Frankton, the attack on Bordeaux in late 1942. There is plenty of documentation showing delivery of British canoes Mk 3's and Mk 6's for British Military in Australia and beyond. For the British-led Operation Jaywick the British Mark 1 type kayaks were used.

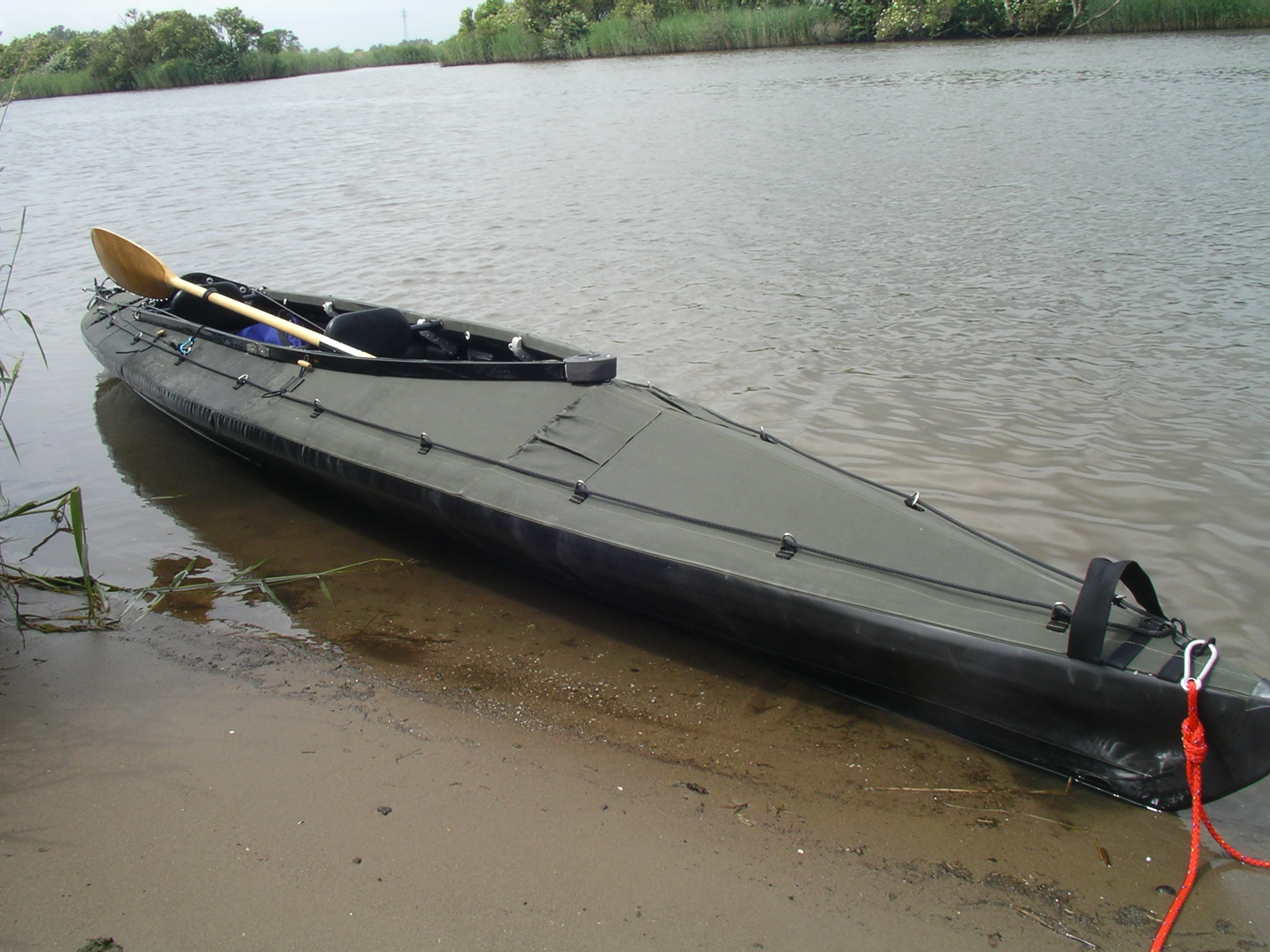
Klepper Aerius Quattro XT in military colors

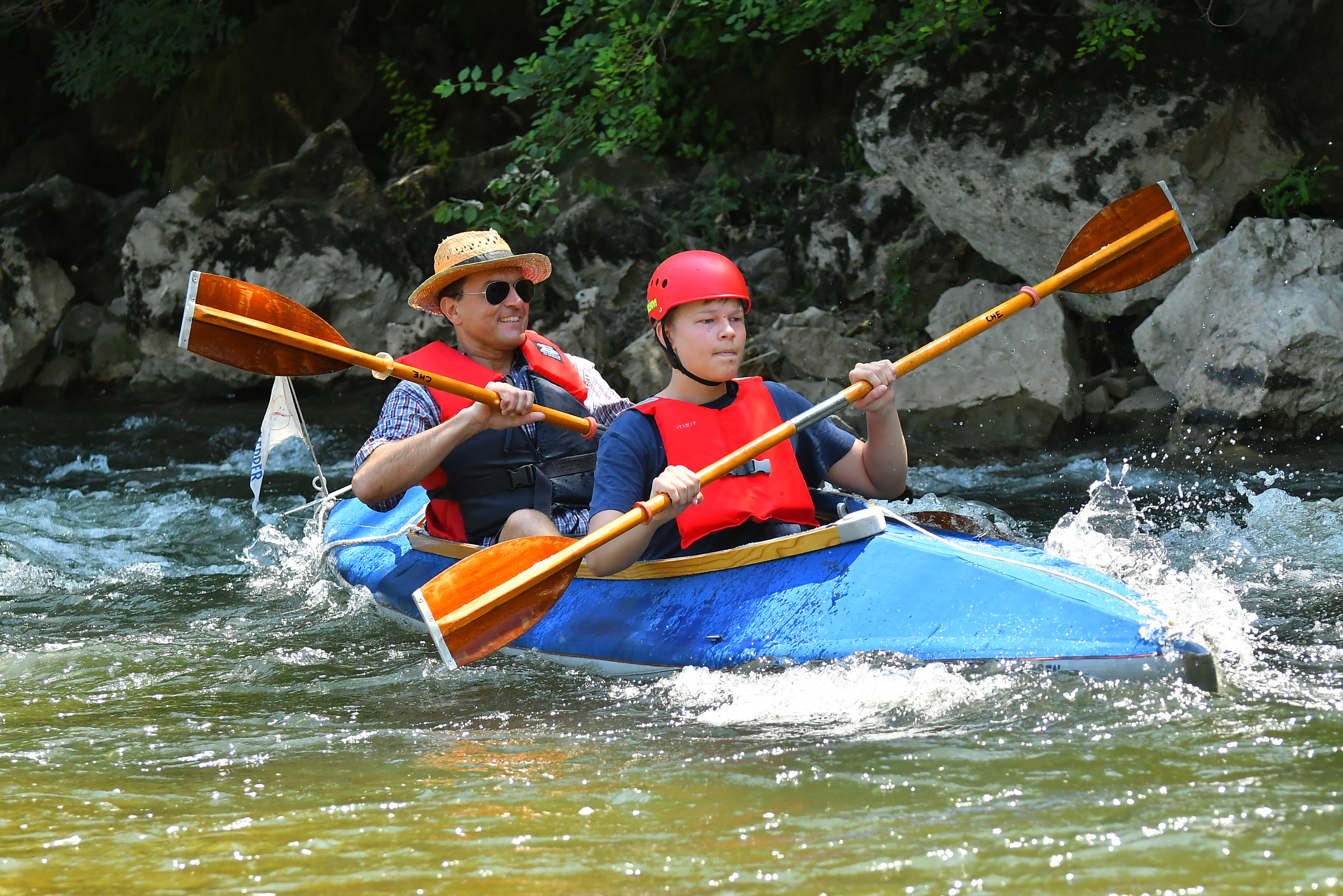
Klepper Aerius II (MY 1968) on Ardeche River (France 2025)

Walter Höhn (English; Hoehn) developed and built the first Swiss folding kayaks, which were tested in white water conditions, in 1924. Hoehn emigrated to Australia in 1928, bringing two examples of his boat designs with him: A 1-man and a 2-man design. His boats were patented (Aust. Patent 117,779) and initially produced for sport use. During the Pacific war, Hoehn and Hedley's P.L. built a total of 1024 folding kayaks, called 'folboats', for the Australian military from the Hoehn design. Hoehn supplied the first 2 folboats for the highly secret 'Operation Jaywick' training at Camp-X near Sydney in 1942. Then Hoehn supplied his folboats for Cairns, Fraser Island and Mount Martha training camps. Hoehn's first military model designated 'Folboat Kayak Type' was succeeded by the 3-seater MKIII. The MKIII was successfully used in many raids during the Pacific War.

Hoehn's first army folboats were tested at the ZES commando base in Cairns, Queensland by commandos under the direction of Major Ivan Lyon for preparation of the Operation Jaywick raid. They included Capt. Sam Carey, Robert Page and Albert Sargent. They were also used for training and actual use in Operation Rimau. At least 34 raids, reconnaissance patrols and rescue missions in the Pacific Islands, notably RIMAU, COPPER, PYTHON, PLATYPUS and SUNCHARLIE used these folboats.

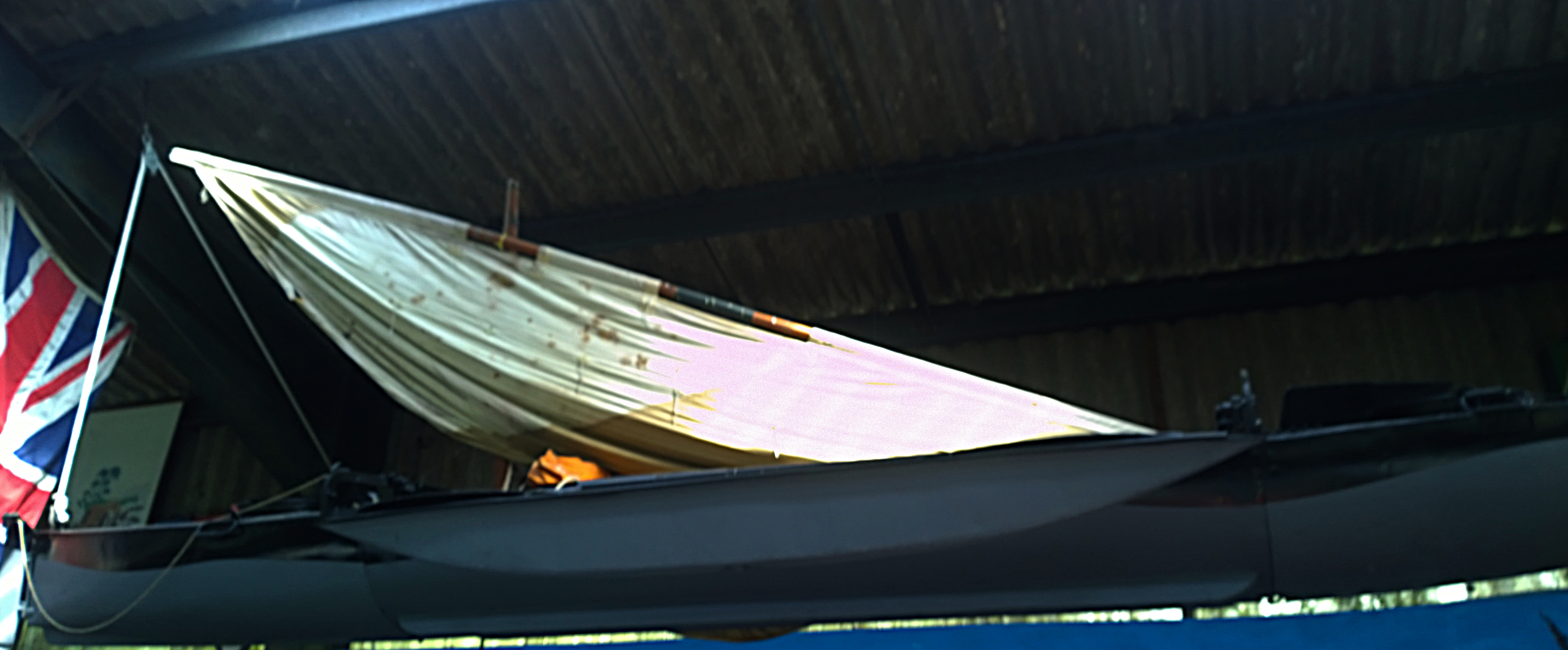
Cockle Mk 7 at the History on Wheels, Museum, Eton Wick, Windsor, UK

=== Cold War and modern use ===
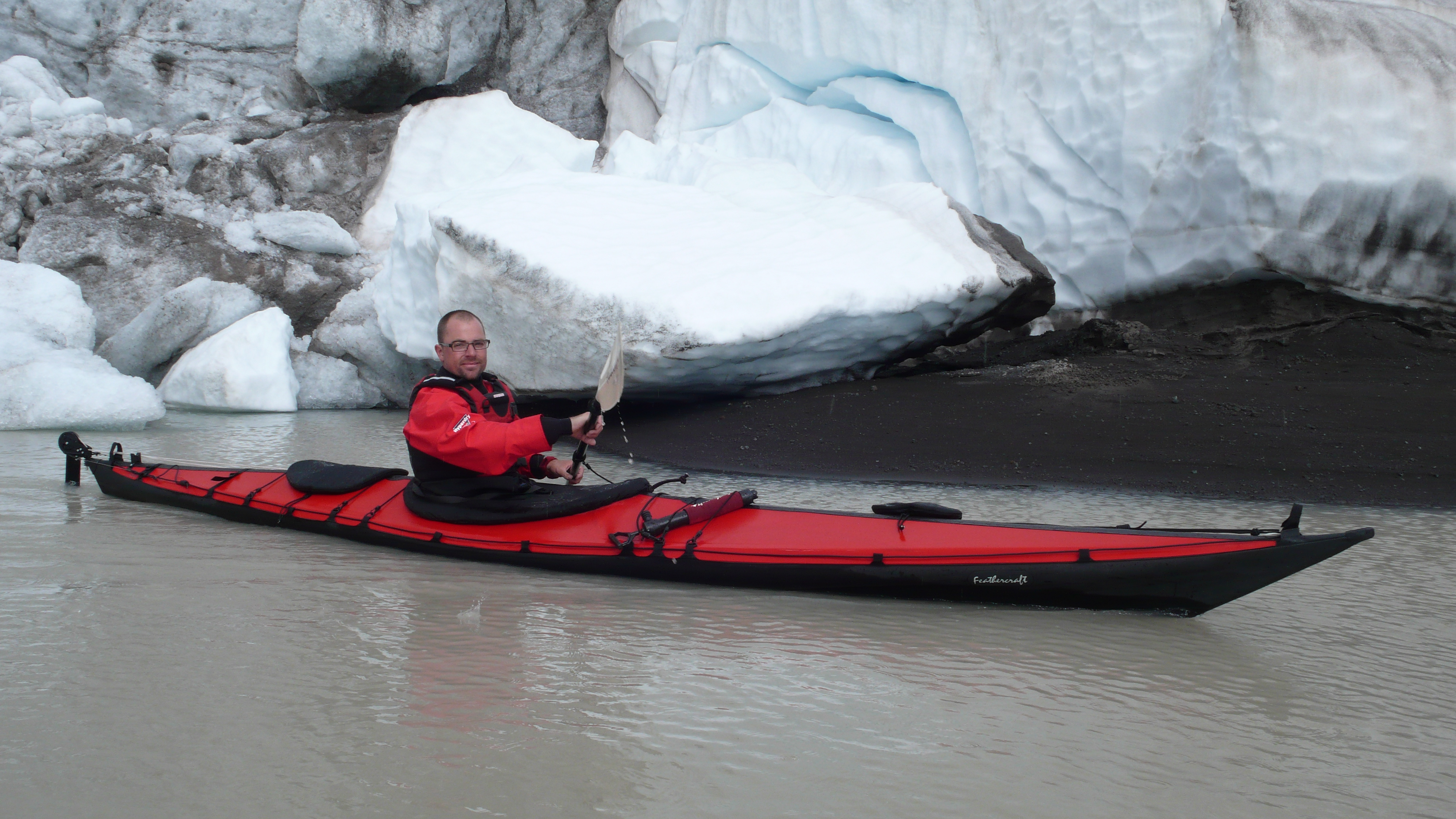
Feathercraft K1 Expedition

The Klepper Aerius II model was introduced in 1951 and is still in production. In 1956, Dr. Hannes Lindemann crossed the Atlantic Ocean in an Aerius II, proof of the folding kayak's integrity and seaworthiness. Their light weight and non-metallic construction has made them the choice of many military special forces. Nautiraid of France produces a special model for military use, as do Klepper and Long Haul, who supply German and US Special Forces, respectively. The newest design innovation has come from Canada's TRAK Kayaks, who in 2007 have come out with a polyurethane skin over aluminum frame design with hydraulics in the cockpit to make the skin extremely taut and also to change the shape of the hull for varying paddling conditions. Armed Forces of Poland use Hermes Sport Company custom equipment.

There are about five major folding kayak manufacturers today, and a handful of small, one-off makers. In addition to Klepper the best-known modern brands have been Feathercraft and Folbot (both of which closed and ended production in 2016 due to slipping sales), also Triton Advanced, Long Haul Folding Kayaks, Nautiraid, Hermes Sport Company (successor to Wayland), Pakboats (who also produce folding canoes that are popular with fly-in wilderness fishing guides and researchers who use them for remote expeditions), Pouch and TRAK. Long Haul double kayak hulls are identical in form to Kleppers (as well as a good many older boats), so a Klepper Aerius II frame can be used with a Long Haul MK-II skin, and vice versa. Several Asian and Eastern European makers have been producing designs similar to those of the Folbot and Feathercraft..

== Design ==
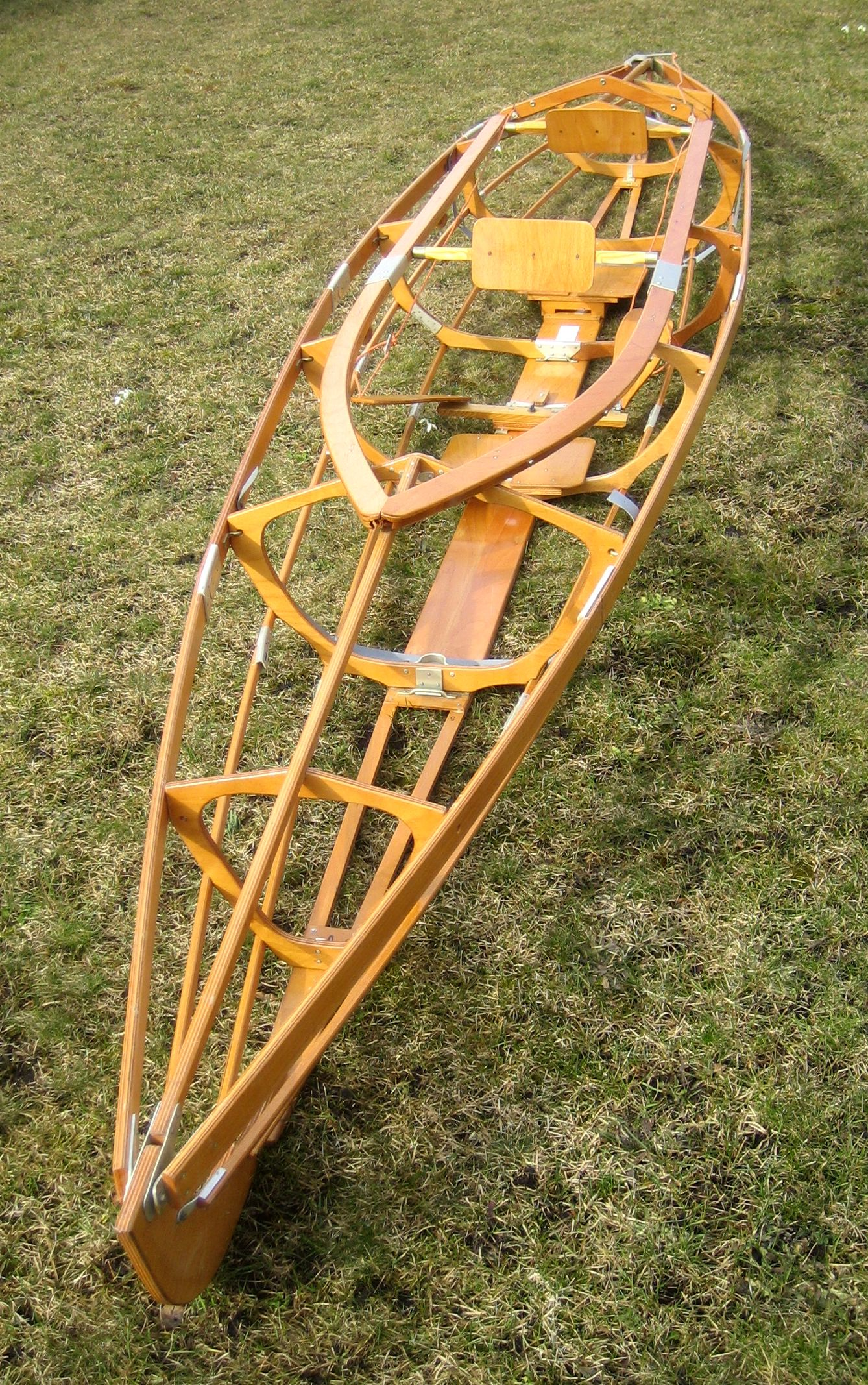
Framework of a 2-man kayak

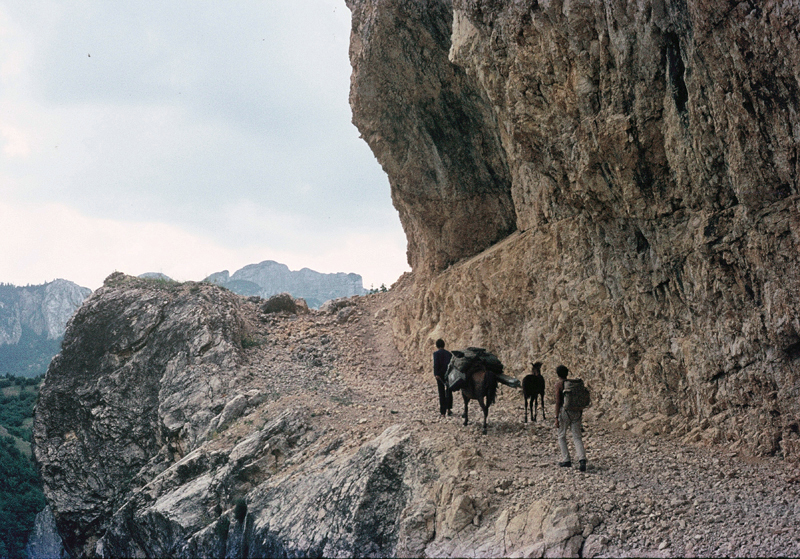
On the way to the put-in with 2 Folboats by train, bus and finally donkey.

Most folding kayaks have very similar construction, even though the materials may differ. Some boats use frames made of mountain ash, spruce and marine plywood, while others use aluminium tubing and various plastics, and a few newer boats such as Fujita and Firstlight use carbon fiber or glass-reinforced plastic tubing. Typically there are solid bow and stern pieces, and anywhere from three to seven ribs connected via some sort of flexible attachment to a number of longerons. Many boats follow the basic design pioneered by Klepper in having a folding set of floorboards and gunwales as well as additional longerons to add stiffness and shape. Many folding kayaks also use air sponsons (up to four in the Klepper Quattro) to tighten the skin on the frame and to adjust the shape of the hull.

Most folding boats have two-part skins, with different materials used for the deck and the hull. Decks can be made of a breathable cotton/hemp blend, as Klepper has done since their early days, or of coated synthetics, as Feathercraft, Folbot, Long Haul Folding Kayaks, Nautiraid, Hermes Sport Company, Pouch and TRAK do. Each approach has its own particular benefits and drawbacks; all work well in practice, and some companies, such as Long Haul Folding Kayaks, offer both materials. Hulls are generally made of a heavily coated synthetic fiber. In the early days, rubber coated cotton canvas was used, while the modern boats use a synthetic elastomer —Hypalon, polyurethane or PVC—over a synthetic (typically Dacron) cloth. The tension on the hull is what gives certain folding kayaks performance advantages over others. One manufacturer (TRAK) incorporates several hydraulic jacks into the frame that allow the user to change the hull's shape.

Assembly time and mechanisms or designs vary by manufacturer and model. Assembly times can be as little as 8–10 minutes or can reach upwards of 40–45 minutes, depending on the design of the kayak and the skill of the assembler. Commando teams can assemble a large Klepper or Long Haul double kayak in around 8 minutes or less. Disassembly is typically half the assembly time.

The Oru Kayak company uses the principles of origami to construct kayaks ranging in length from 9 ft (2.7 m) to 16 ft (4.9 m) using a single sheet of corrugated plastic as both the ribs and skin. The Oru kayak folds into itself to form a carrying case when not in use.

The stability and design robustness of several folding kayak models makes them ideal for upwind and downwind sailing. Dr. Hannes Lindemann's Atlantic crossing was in most part achieved by sailing.

== Performance ==
Folders are known for their durability, stability, and longevity: The Klepper Aerius I (a single-seater) was used successfully in the early days of white-water kayaking before the era of modern polyethylene boats, owing to its durability and excellent manoeuvrability. Some well-maintained Kleppers have been in use for more than 50 years.

Although a few hardshell kayakers are critical of folding boats, and do not regard them as in the same category as hardshell boats, folding kayaks exhibit many of the same paddling characteristics as the original skin-and-frame vessels of the circumpolar north. Other than contemporary versions of Inuit, Aleut, and Yup'ik kayaks and baidarkas, they are the closest relatives to the skin-and-frame boats of the past. The performance of these folding kayaks depend largely on the design of the kayak. The speed may be comparable to sea kayaks made from composite materials such as fibreglass or carbon/kevlar. In general, most folding kayaks trade off some performance in speed for the ease of travelling with a kayak. This is because the sponsons found in most modern folding kayaks make the kayaks wider; this increases drag and slows the kayak down.

Though they do tend to be somewhat less efficient in flat water than hardshell kayaks of similar dimensions, folding kayaks and other skin-on-frame boats have characteristics that can aid paddling efficiency in rough water conditions. In a hardshell kayak, waves and chop on the water can slow down the momentum of the craft and push the kayak back. The flexibility of the frame and the "give" of the skin in a folding kayak help the boat absorb the energy of waves and current, allowing the boat to move more easily through confused waves that buffet hardshells and to ride up over waves rather than smashing into their face. Folding kayaks (and canoes) provide a closer feeling of contact with the water and waves than hardshell boats.

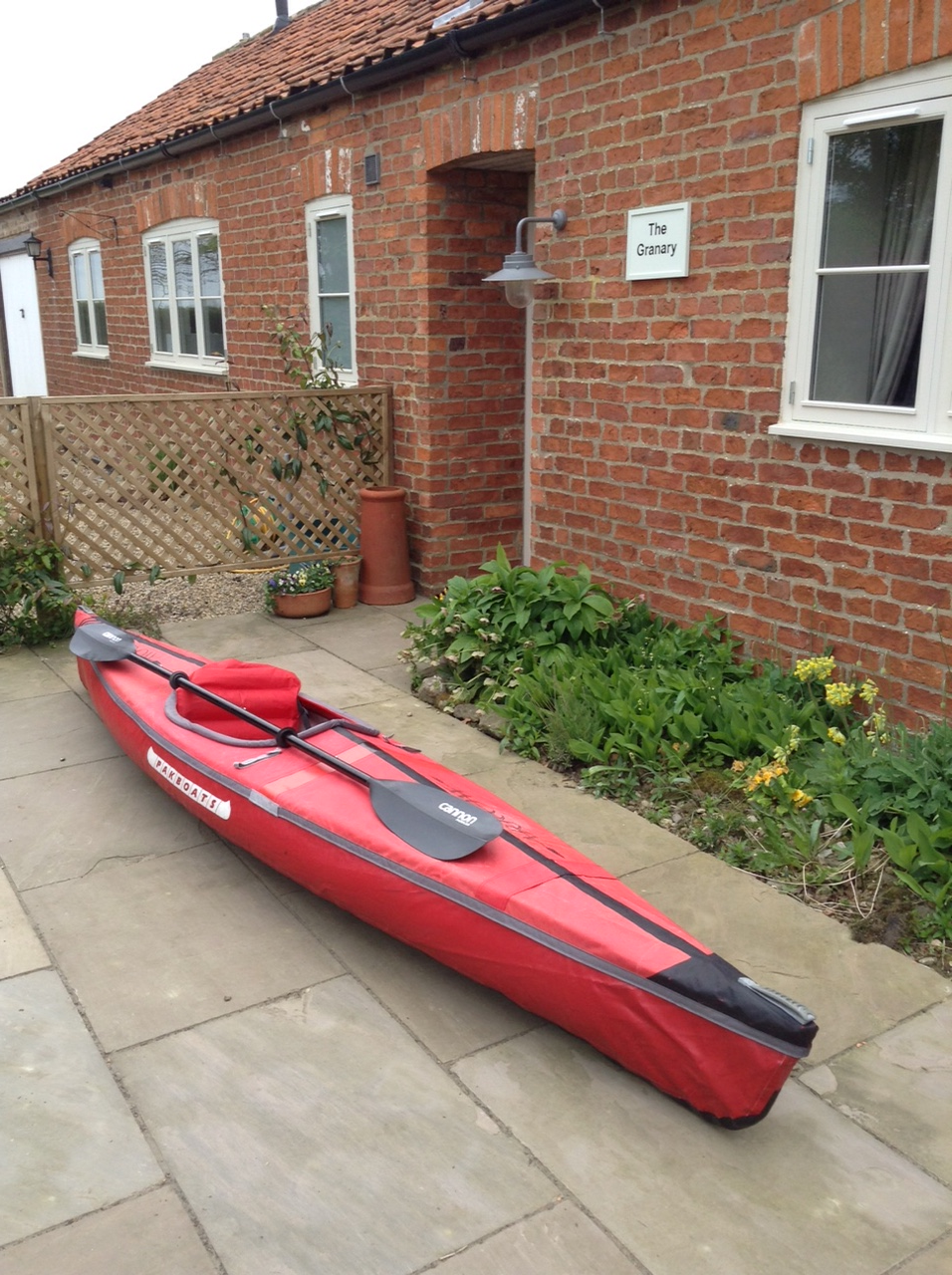
12-foot (3.7 m) Pakboat Puffin folding kayak, weighing 24 pounds (11 kg)

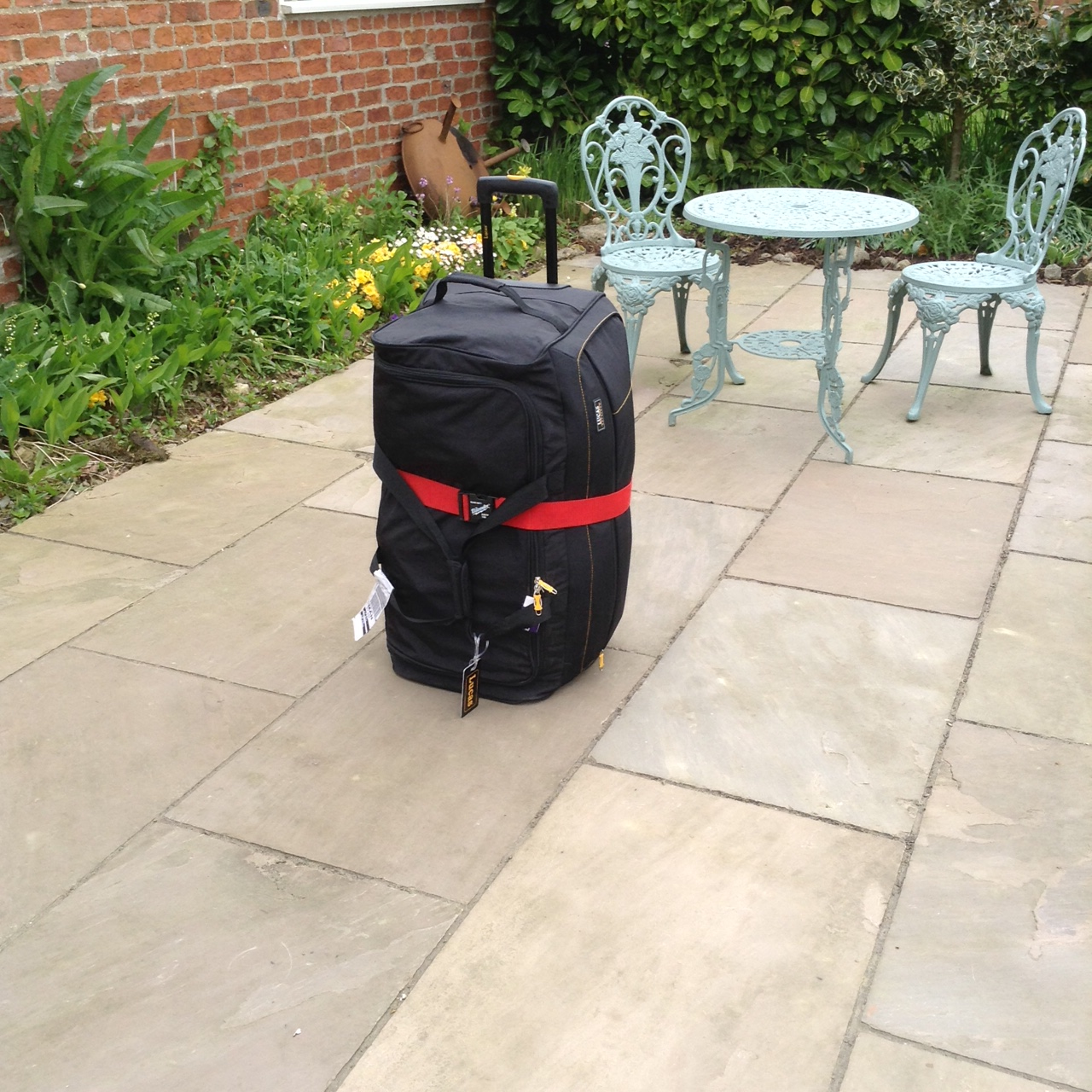
'Puffin' kayak packed in standard airline check-in bag

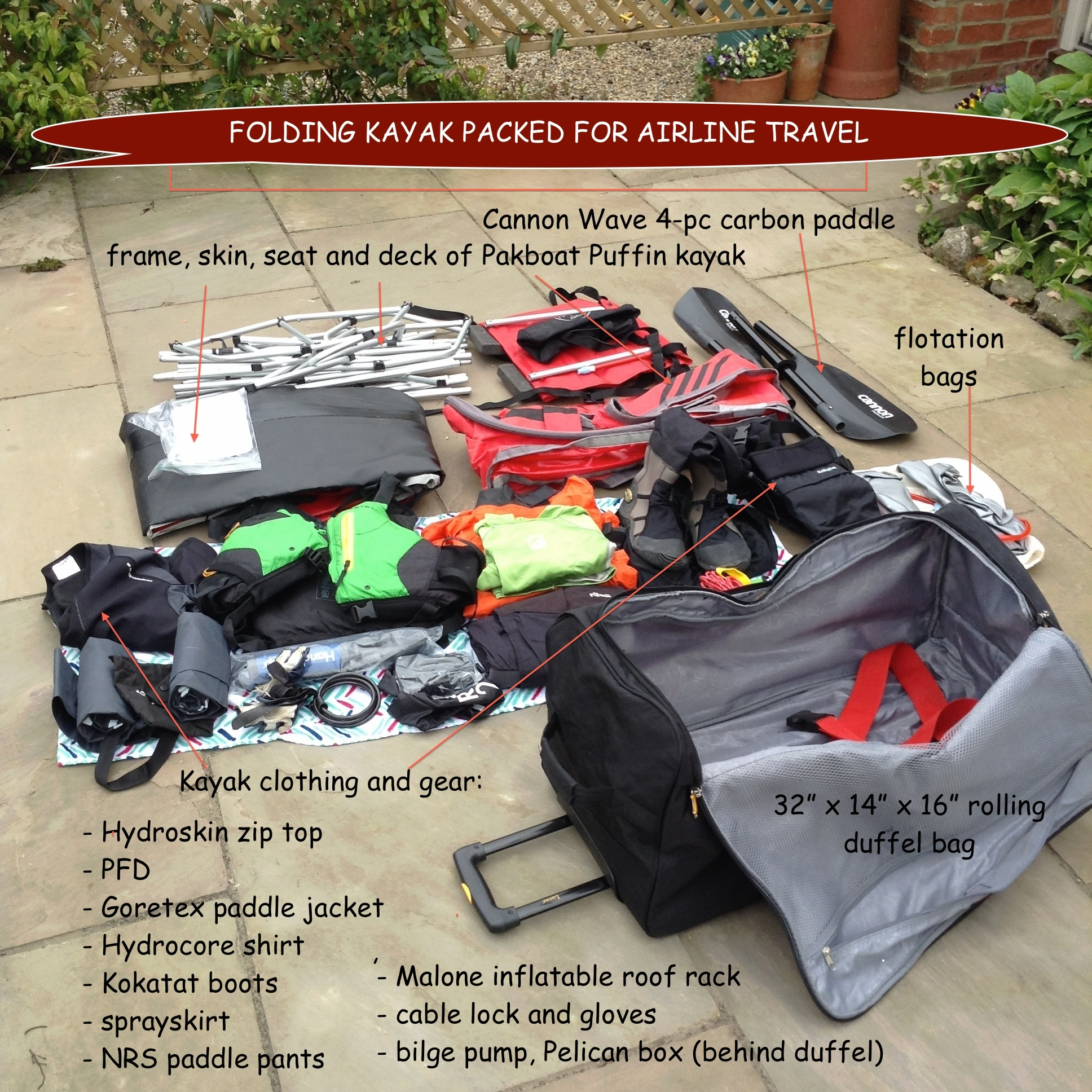
'Puffin' folding kayak and all paddling accessories

Two substantial advantages of folding kayaks are lightness and portability. Most models typically weigh 1/3 to 1/2 less than composite (fiberglass or rotomold) or polyurethane kayaks of similar dimensions. Most models can be packed down small enough when dismantled to be stored in a closet or carried in the boot of a car and can be checked as baggage on most airlines. Even having to pay excess baggage charges for some flights is still more economical than the cost of renting boats at a paddler's destination. For example, the 12-foot (3.7 m) Pakboat Puffin solo folding kayak weighs only 24 pounds (11 kg) with the optional deck. It can be packed in a bag that meets airline dimensions and weight for "standard" baggage with enough room to spare for all the safety gear and clothing needed for paddling.

== Notable owners ==
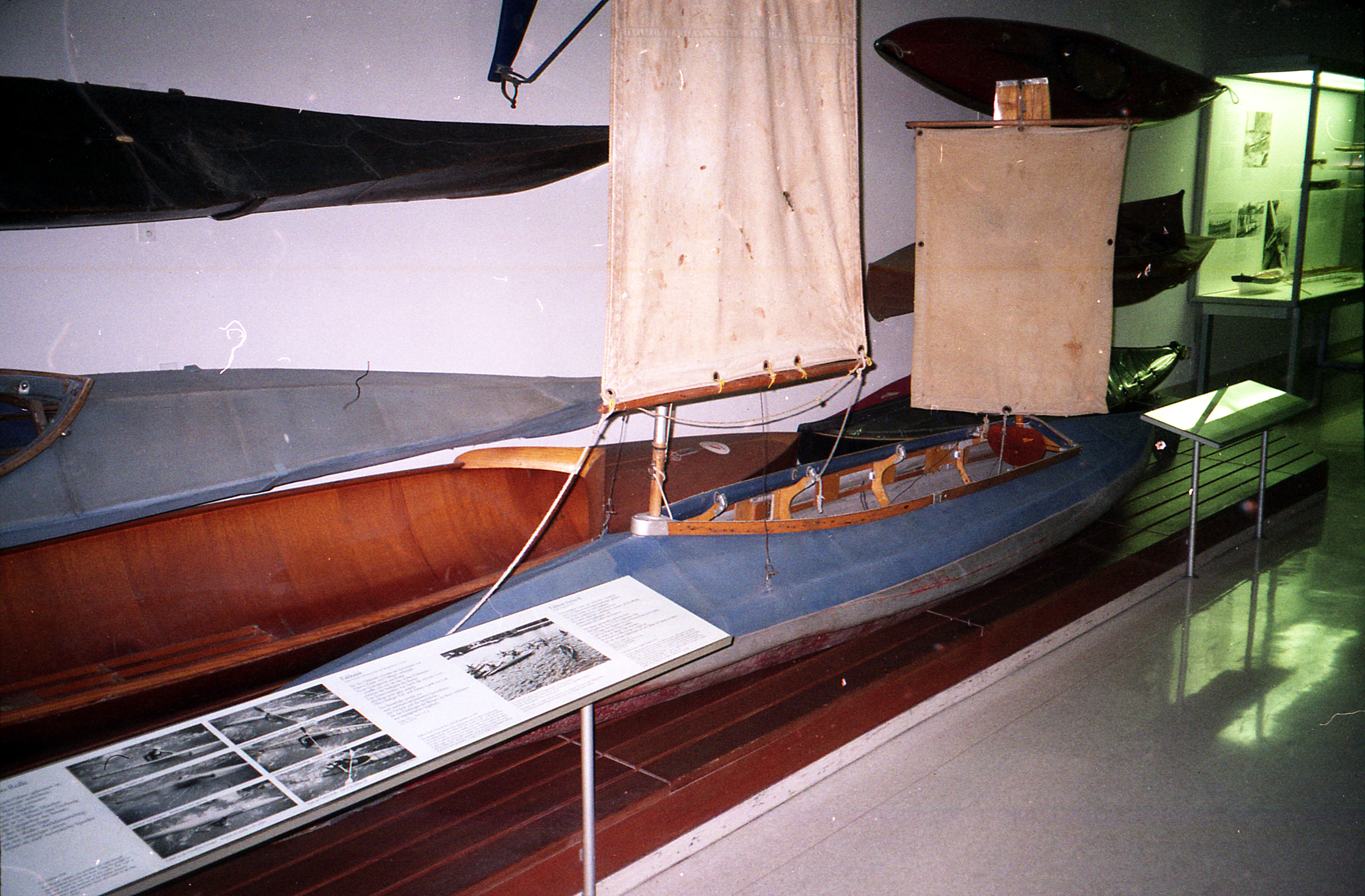
Klepper Aerius II of Hannes Lindemann used in his Atlantic crossing

Roger Courtney, founder of the Special Boat Service, had his own folding kayak called 'Buttercup'. It was a two seater sports model he had purchased from Selfridges department store in London. It was 17 feet long and included a mast and sails. Over six months he navigated it from Lake Victoria along the River Nile to the Mediterranean Sea. For their honeymoon in 1938 Courtney and his wife paddled Buttercup down the River Danube. His experience and his demonstration of his skills in Buttercup were instrumental in the development of modern canoe warfare and the British military units that would go on to form the SBS.

The folding kayak that used to belong to pope John Paul II has been on display at the Archdiocesan Museum in Kraków, Poland since 2003. When already a cardinal, he shared the ownership of "The Pebble" with a student friend of his, who later donated it to the museum.

In 1956 the German doctor Hannes Lindemann crossed the Atlantic using a Klepper Aerius II folding kayak, today the kayak is exhibited in the Deutsches Museum.

== See also ==
- Baidarka
- Folding boat
- Oskar Speck
- Sea kayak
- Sea sock
- Taimen (kayak)

== Notes ==
Footnotes

Citations
