= 1977 Wildwater Canoeing World Championships =

- Host city: Spittal, Austria
- Level: Senior
- Events: 10

The 1977 Wildwater Canoeing World Championships was the 10th edition of the global wildwater canoeing competition, Wildwater Canoeing World Championships, organised by the International Canoe Federation.

== Podiums ==
=== K1 ===
Men
Rank	Athlete	Country	Time
1st place, gold medalist(s)	Gerhard Peinhaupt	Austria
2nd place, silver medalist(s)	Michel Magdinier	France
3rd place, bronze medalist(s)	Bernd Kast	West Germany

Women
Rank	Athlete	Country	Time
1st place, gold medalist(s)	Gisela Steigerwald	West Germany
2nd place, silver medalist(s)	Elsbeth Käser	Switzerland
3rd place, bronze medalist(s)	Dominique Berigaud	France

Men team
Rank	Athlete	Country	Time
1st place, gold medalist(s)	Peter Haas; Hans Schlecht; Gerhard Peinhaupt	Austria
2nd place, silver medalist(s)	Degenhard Pfeiffer; Peter Gunzenberger; Bernd Kast	West Germany
3rd place, bronze medalist(s)	Michel Magdinier; Henry Estanguet; Claude Bénézit	France

Women team
Rank	Athlete	Country	Time
1st place, gold medalist(s)	Brigitte Gödecke; Gisela Grothaus; Renate Prijon	West Germany
2nd place, silver medalist(s)	Kathrin Weiss; Alena Kucera; Elisabeth Käser	Switzerland
3rd place, bronze medalist(s)	Dominique Berigaud; Bernadette Roche; Jocelyne Roupioz	France

=== C1 ===
Men
Rank	Athlete	Country	Time
1st place, gold medalist(s)	Ernst Libuda	West Germany
2nd place, silver medalist(s)	Gilles Zok	France
3rd place, bronze medalist(s)	Oldrich Blazicek	Czechoslovakia

Men team
Rank	Athlete	Country	Time
1st place, gold medalist(s)	François Bonnet; Gilles Zok; Jean-Luc Verger	France
2nd place, silver medalist(s)	Oldrich Blazicek; Jan Cervenka; Milan Gaba	Czechoslovakia
3rd place, bronze medalist(s)	Willi Fiedler; Ernst Libuda; Josef Schumacher	West Germany

=== C2 ===
Men
Rank	Athlete	Country	Time
1st place, gold medalist(s)	Roland Schindler; Dieter Pioch	West Germany
2nd place, silver medalist(s)	Peter Probst; Hardy Künzli	Switzerland
3rd place, bronze medalist(s)	Helmo Müllneritsch; Helmar Steindl	Austria

Men team
Rank	Athlete	Country	Time
1st place, gold medalist(s)	Gefeller / Berngruber; Schindler / Pioch; Schmidt / Roock	West Germany
2nd place, silver medalist(s)	Wyss / Wyss; Walter / Hirsch; Künzli / Probst	Switzerland
3rd place, bronze medalist(s)	Grant / Burton; Ron Lugbill / David Hearn; Jon Lugbill / Bob Robison	United States

Mixed
Rank	Athlete	Country	Time
1st place, gold medalist(s)	Catherine Mollard; Gérard Mollard	France
2nd place, silver medalist(s)	Imgard Rose; Eckehard Rose	West Germany
3rd place, bronze medalist(s)	Rosine Billet; Bernard Billet	France

Mixed team
Rank	Athlete	Country	Time
1st place, gold medalist(s)	Billet / Billet; Parisy / Feuillette; Roggero / Roggero	France
2nd place, silver medalist(s)	Wagner / Brockman; Habermann / Berngruber; Rose / Rose	West Germany
3rd place, bronze medalist(s)	Wright / MacConghy; Clarke / Chamberlin; Mela / Liebman	United States

== Medal table ==
Rank	Country	1st place, gold medalist(s)	2nd place, silver medalist(s)	3rd place, bronze medalist(s)	Tot.
1	West Germany	5	3	2	10
2	France	3	2	4	9
3	Austria	2	0	1	3
4	Switzerland	0	4	0	4
5	Czechoslovakia	0	1	1	2
6	United States	0	0	2	2
Total		10	10	10	30

== See also ==
- Wildwater canoeing
