= 1981 Wildwater Canoeing World Championships =

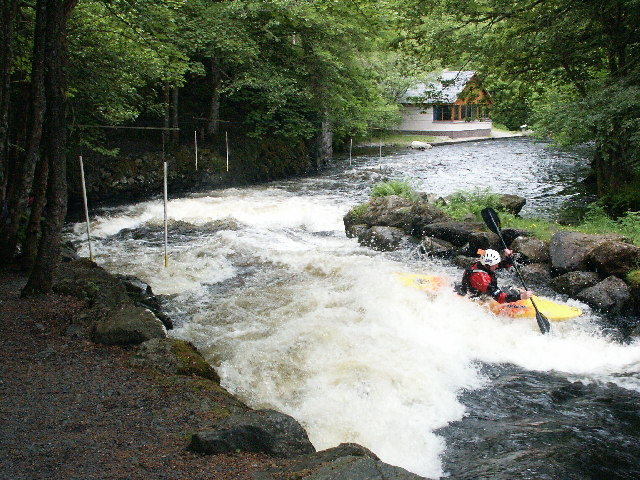
- National White Water Centre. Frongoch, Bala
- Host city: Bala, United Kingdom
- Level: Senior
- Events: 9

The 1981 Wildwater Canoeing World Championships was the 12th edition of the global wildwater canoeing competition, Wildwater Canoeing World Championships, organised by the International Canoe Federation.

== Results ==
=== K1 ===
==== Men ====
Rank	Athlete	Country	Time
1st place, gold medalist(s)	Claude Bénézit	France	
2nd place, silver medalist(s)	Marco Previde-Massara	Italy	
3rd place, bronze medalist(s)	Bernard Morin	France	
4th	Hibble Jeremy	United Kingdom	
5th	Hollerieth Konrad	West Germany	

==== Men team ====
Rank	Athlete	Country	Time
1st place, gold medalist(s)	Claude Bénézit; Bernard Morin; Christian Frossard	France	
2nd place, silver medalist(s)	Jeremy Hibble; David Taylor; Jerome Truran	United Kingdom	
3rd place, bronze medalist(s)	Degenhard Pfeiffer; Konrad Hollerieth; Michael Graessl	West Germany	

==== Women ====
Rank	Athlete	Country	Time
1st place, gold medalist(s)	Dominique Gardette	France	
2nd place, silver medalist(s)	Gisela Grothaus	West Germany	
3rd place, bronze medalist(s)	Anne Plant	East Germany	
4th	Elisabeth Blencowe	Australia	
5th	Dagmar Stupp	West Germany	

==== Women team ====
Rank	Athlete	Country	Time
1st place, gold medalist(s)	Dagmar Stupp; Gisela Grothaus; Karin Wahl	West Germany	
2nd place, silver medalist(s)	Sabine Weiss; Claire Costa; Kathrin Weiss	Switzerland	
3rd place, bronze medalist(s)	Cathy Hearn; Leslie Klein; Carol Fisher	United States	

=== C1 ===
==== Men ====
Rank	Athlete	Country	Time
1st place, gold medalist(s)	Gilles Zok	France	
2nd place, silver medalist(s)	Jean-Luc Verger	France	
3rd place, bronze medalist(s)	John Butler	United States	
4th	Reiner Pioch	West Germany	
5th	René Paul	Switzerland	

==== Men team ====
Rank	Athlete	Country	Time
1st place, gold medalist(s)	Jean-Luc Ponchon; Gilles Zok; Jean-Luc Verger	France	
2nd place, silver medalist(s)	Chuck Lyda; Jim Underwood; John Butler	United States	
3rd place, bronze medalist(s)	Klaus Ernst; Willi Fiedler; Rainer Pioch	West Germany	

=== C2 ===
==== Men ====
Rank	Athlete	Country	Time
1st place, gold medalist(s)	Daniel Jacquet; Jean-Jacques Hayne	France	
2nd place, silver medalist(s)	Michel Doux; Patrick Bunichon	France	
3rd place, bronze medalist(s)	Jean-Luc Rigaut; Gilles Bernard	France	
4th	Peter Probst; Roland Wyss	Switzerland	
5th	Jean-Claude Delage; François Picard	France	

==== Men team ====
Rank	Athlete	Country	Time
1st place, gold medalist(s)	Jacquet / Hayne; Doux / Bunichon; Rigaut / Bernard	France	
2nd place, silver medalist(s)	Proquitte / Gonschior; Schumacher / Runo; Bansleben / Berngruber	West Germany	
3rd place, bronze medalist(s)	Probst / Wyss; Zimmermann / Fürst; Von Büren / Schläppi	Switzerland	

==== Mixed ====
Rank	Athlete	Country	Time
1st place, gold medalist(s)	Elizabeth Johns; Michael Hpsher	United States	
2nd place, silver medalist(s)	Claudine Peiro; Germinal Peiro	France	
3rd place, bronze medalist(s)	Petra Berghausen; Eduard Berghausen	West Germany	
4th	Claude Jenden; Rodney Jenden	Luxembourg	
5th	Eva Stupp; Wolfgang Schumacher	West Germany	

== Medal table ==
Rank	Country	1st place, gold medalist(s)	2nd place, silver medalist(s)	3rd place, bronze medalist(s)	Tot.
1	France	7	3	2	12
2	West Germany	1	2	3	6
3	United States	1	2	2	5
4	United Kingdom	0	1	0	1
-	Switzerland	0	1	1	2
6	Italy	0	1	0	1
7	East Germany	0	0	1	1
Total		9	9	9	27

== See also ==
- Wildwater canoeing
