= 1975 Wildwater Canoeing World Championships =

- Host city: Skopje, Yugoslavia
- Level: Senior
- Events: 10

The 1975 Wildwater Canoeing World Championships was the 9th edition of the global wildwater canoeing competition, Wildwater Canoeing World Championships, organised by the International Canoe Federation.

== Podiums ==
=== K1 ===
Men
Rank	Athlete	Country	Time
1st place, gold medalist(s)	Jean-Pierre Burny	Belgium
2nd place, silver medalist(s)	Michel Magdinier	France
3rd place, bronze medalist(s)	Bernd Kast	West Germany

Women
Rank	Athlete	Country	Time
1st place, gold medalist(s)	Gisela Steigerwald	West Germany
2nd place, silver medalist(s)	Pauline Squires-Goodwin	United Kingdom
3rd place, bronze medalist(s)	Hilary Peacock	United Kingdom

Men team
Rank	Athlete	Country	Time
1st place, gold medalist(s)	Peter Haas; Hans Schlecht; Gerhard Peinhaupt	Austria
2nd place, silver medalist(s)	Jean-Pierre Burny; Jean-Claude Michiels; Jean-Pierre Renglet	Belgium
3rd place, bronze medalist(s)	Degenhard Pfeiffer; Heini Ott; Bernd Kast	West Germany

Women team
Rank	Athlete	Country	Time
1st place, gold medalist(s)	Peggy Mitchell; Hilary Peacock; Pauline Goodwin	United Kingdom
2nd place, silver medalist(s)	Chantal Boverie; Ingrid Burny; Rosine Roland	Belgium
3rd place, bronze medalist(s)	Kathrin Weiss; Claire Costa; Elisabeth Käser	Switzerland

=== C1 ===
Men
Rank	Athlete	Country	Time
1st place, gold medalist(s)	Jean-Luc Verger	France
2nd place, silver medalist(s)	Josef Schumacher	West Germany
3rd place, bronze medalist(s)	Al Button	United States

Men team
Rank	Athlete	Country	Time
1st place, gold medalist(s)	Willi Fiedler; Josef Schumacher; Josef Heinz Strätmans	West Germany
2nd place, silver medalist(s)	François Bonnet; Jean Gardahaut; Jean-Luc Verger	France
3rd place, bronze medalist(s)	Karel Tresnak; Jiri Gut; Jan Cervenka	Czechoslovakia

=== C2 ===
Men
Rank	Athlete	Country	Time
1st place, gold medalist(s)	Roland Schindler; Dieter Pioch	West Germany
2nd place, silver medalist(s)	Pierre-François Lefauconnier; Gilles Lefauconnier	France
3rd place, bronze medalist(s)	Claude Bost; Jean Paul Meynard	France

Men team
Rank	Athlete	Country	Time
1st place, gold medalist(s)	Lefauconnier / Lefauconnier; Bost / Meynard; Silotto / Durand	France
2nd place, silver medalist(s)	Weisker / Weisker; Schindler / Pioch; Scholz / Runo	West Germany
3rd place, bronze medalist(s)	Wyss / Wyss; Künzl / Probst; Schneider / Nyffeler	Switzerland

Mixed
Rank	Athlete	Country	Time
1st place, gold medalist(s)	Imgard Rose; Eckehard Rose	West Germany
2nd place, silver medalist(s)	Rosine Billet; Bernard Billet	France
3rd place, bronze medalist(s)	Claudette Parisy; Alain Feuillette	France

Mixed team
Rank	Athlete	Country	Time
1st place, gold medalist(s)	Billet / Billet; Parisy / Feuillette; Roggero / Roggero	France
2nd place, silver medalist(s)	Wagner / Brockman; Habermann / Berngruber; Rose / Rose	West Germany
3rd place, bronze medalist(s)	Wright / MacConghy; Clarke / Chamberlin; Mela / Liebman	United States

== Medal table ==
Rank	Country	1st place, gold medalist(s)	2nd place, silver medalist(s)	3rd place, bronze medalist(s)	Tot.
1	West Germany	4	3	2	9
2	France	3	4	2	9
3	Belgium	1	2	0	3
4	United Kingdom	1	1	1	3
5	Austria	1	0	0	1
6	United States	0	0	2	2
7	Switzerland	0	0	2	2
8	Czechoslovakia	0	0	1	1
Total		10	10	10	30

== See also ==
- Wildwater canoeing
