= 1973 Wildwater Canoeing World Championships =

- Host city: Muotathal, Switzerland
- Level: Senior
- Events: 10

The 1973 Wildwater Canoeing World Championships was the 8th edition of the global wildwater canoeing competition, Wildwater Canoeing World Championships, organised by the International Canoe Federation.

== Podiums ==
=== K1 ===
Men
Rank	Athlete	Country	Time
1st place, gold medalist(s)	Jean-Pierre Burny	Belgium
2nd place, silver medalist(s)	Bernd Kast	West Germany
3rd place, bronze medalist(s)	Ulrich Pech	West Germany

Women
Rank	Athlete	Country	Time
1st place, gold medalist(s)	Gisela Steigerwald	West Germany
2nd place, silver medalist(s)	Ulrike Deppe	West Germany
3rd place, bronze medalist(s)	Elsbeth Käser	Switzerland

Men team
Rank	Athlete	Country	Time
1st place, gold medalist(s)	Degenhard Pfeiffer; Ulrich Pech; Bernd Kast	West Germany
2nd place, silver medalist(s)	Jean-Pierre Burny; Jean-Claude Michiels; Paul Lupcin	Belgium
3rd place, bronze medalist(s)	Kurt Presslmayr; Hans Schlecht; Gerhard Peinhaupt	Austria

Women team
Rank	Athlete	Country	Time
1st place, gold medalist(s)	Gisela Grothaus; Ulrike Deppe; Magda Wunderlich	West Germany
2nd place, silver medalist(s)	Candice Clark; Carol Fisher; Margaret Nutt	United States
3rd place, bronze medalist(s)	Mélanie Alexis; Ingrid Burny; Rosine Roland	Belgium

=== C1 ===
Men
Rank	Athlete	Country	Time
1st place, gold medalist(s)	Bernd Heinemann	West Germany
2nd place, silver medalist(s)	Jean-Luc Verger	France
3rd place, bronze medalist(s)	Jiri Gut	Czechoslovakia

Men team
Rank	Athlete	Country	Time
1st place, gold medalist(s)	Walter Gehlen; Bernd Heinemann; Josef Schumacher	West Germany
2nd place, silver medalist(s)	Karel Tresnak; Jiri Gut; Peter Sodomka	Czechoslovakia
3rd place, bronze medalist(s)	Jean-Luc Verger; Daniel Debusne; Guy Huteau	France

=== C2 ===
Men
Rank	Athlete	Country	Time
1st place, gold medalist(s)	Pierre-François Lefauconnier; Gilles Lefauconnier	France
2nd place, silver medalist(s)	Eckehard Rose; Jan Pospisil	West Germany
3rd place, bronze medalist(s)	Norbert Schmidt; Hermann Roock	West Germany

Men team
Rank	Athlete	Country	Time
1st place, gold medalist(s)	Rose / Pospisil; Schindler / Pioch; Schmidt / Roock	West Germany
2nd place, silver medalist(s)	Feuilette / Bonnet; Leclerc / Girault; Lefauconnier / Lefauconnier	France
3rd place, bronze medalist(s)	Wyss / Wyss; Hinnen / Ettlin; Koch / Bühler	Switzerland

Mixed
Rank	Athlete	Country	Time
1st place, gold medalist(s)	Hanneliese Kremslehner; Helmut Ramelov	Austria
2nd place, silver medalist(s)	Sigrid Ritter; Armin Ritter	West Germany
3rd place, bronze medalist(s)	Ursel Habermann; Andreas Berngruber	West Germany

Mixed team
Rank	Athlete	Country	Time
1st place, gold medalist(s)	Wagner / Brockman; Habermann / Berngruber; Ritter / Ritter	West Germany
2nd place, silver medalist(s)	Knight / Knight; Lyda / Losick; Mela / Liebman	United States
3rd place, bronze medalist(s)	Aebi / Aebi; Bally / Bally; Fontaine / Fontaine	Switzerland

== Medal table ==
Rank	Country	1st place, gold medalist(s)	2nd place, silver medalist(s)	3rd place, bronze medalist(s)	Tot.
1	West Germany	7	4	3	14
2	France	1	2	1	4
3	Belgium	1	1	1	3
4	Austria	1	0	1	2
5	United States	0	2	0	2
6	Czechoslovakia	0	1	1	2
7	Switzerland	0	0	3	3
Total		10	10	10	30

== See also ==
- Wildwater canoeing
