= Milan Gába =

Czechoslovak slalom canoeist

Medal record

Men's canoe slalom

Representing Czechoslovakia

World Championships
Bronze medal – third place	1979 Jonquière	C1 team

Milan Gába is a former Czechoslovak slalom canoeist of Slovak nationality who competed from the late 1970s to the early 1980s.

Gába participated in three World Championships, winning a bronze medal in the C1 team event at the 1979 World Championships in Jonquière.

== Major championships results timeline ==
Event		1977	1978	1979	1980	1981
World Championships	C1	14	Not held	9	Not held	8
World Championships	C1 team	—	Not held	3	Not held	5
