= 1979 ICF Canoe Slalom World Championships =

Canoe slalom event in Jonquière, Quebec, Canada

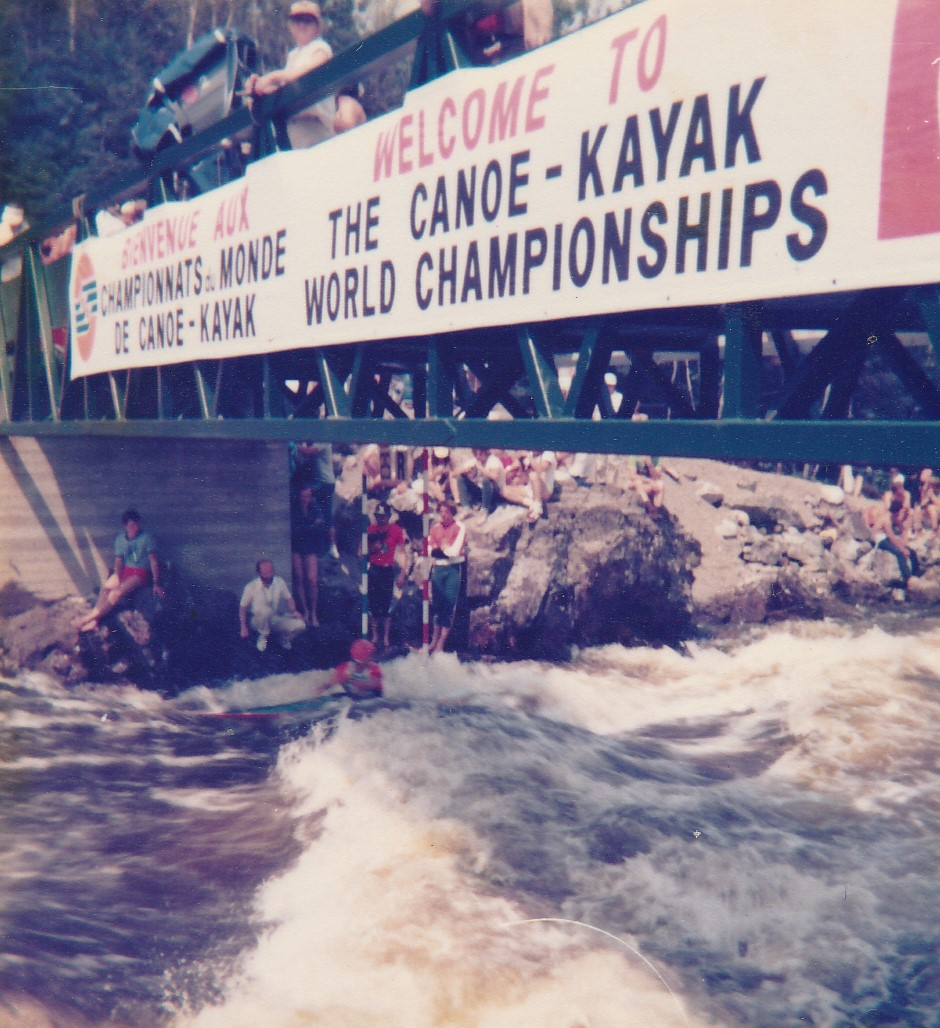
Welcome sign over the canoe slalom course

The 1979 ICF Canoe Slalom World Championships were held in Jonquière, Quebec, Canada under the auspices of International Canoe Federation. It was the 16th edition. This marked the first time the championships were held outside Europe. The mixed C2 event was not held at these championships. East Germany did not take part and Czechoslovakia, as the other traditional powerhouse, won only one medal. West Germany won three medals while the United States led the medal count with seven, the first time an English-speaking country had done so.

== Medal summary ==
=== Men's ===
==== Canoe ====
Event	Gold	Points	Silver	Points	Bronze	Points
C1	Jon Lugbill (USA)	238.49	David Hearn (USA)	242.85	Bob Robison (USA)	255.62
C1 team	United States; Jon Lugbill; David Hearn; Bob Robison	279.55	West Germany; Jürgen Schnitzerling; Walter Horn; Udo Werner	353.17	Czechoslovakia; Milan Gába; Karel Třešňák; Karel Ťoupalík	414.88
C2	West Germany; Dieter Welsink; Peter Czupryna	260.67	France; Pierre Calori; Jacques Calori	275.43	Poland; Wojciech Kudlik; Jerzy Jeż	277.11
C2 team	Poland; Wojciech Kudlik & Jerzy Jeż; Jan Frączek & Ryszard Seruga; Zbigniew Czaja & Jacek Kasprzycki	334.65	France; Pierre Calori & Jacques Calori; Richard Hernanz & Mare Labedens; Jean Lamy & Robert Platt	373.35	Switzerland; Christoph Studer & Ernst Rudin; Martin Wyss & Roland Wyss; Hardy Künzli & Peter Probst	477.81

==== Kayak ====
Event	Gold	Points	Silver	Points	Bronze	Points
K1	Peter Fauster (AUT)	209.08	Eduard Wolffhardt (AUT)	211.09	Richard Fox (GBR)	211.47
K1 team	United Kingdom; Richard Fox; Albert Kerr; Allan Edge	235.36	Austria; Norbert Sattler; Peter Fauster; Eduard Wolffhardt	243.28	Switzerland; Milo Duffek; René Zimmermann; Martin Brandenburger	245.48

=== Women's ===
==== Kayak ====
Event	Gold	Points	Silver	Points	Bronze	Points
K1	Cathy Hearn (USA)	253.30	Elizabeth Sharman (GBR)	253.86	Linda Harrison (USA)	257.74
K1 team	United States; Cathy Hearn; Linda Harrison; Becky Judd	384.07	West Germany; Ulrike Deppe; Elke Dietze; Gabriele Köllmann	385.81	Switzerland; Kathrin Weiss; Sabine Weiss; Alena Kucera	409.91

== Medals table ==
Rank	Nation	Gold	Silver	Bronze	Total
1	United States (USA)	4	1	2	7
2	Austria (AUT)	1	2	0	3
2	West Germany (FRG)	1	2	0	3
4	Great Britain (GBR)	1	1	1	3
5	Poland (POL)	1	0	1	2
6	France (FRA)	0	2	0	2
7	Switzerland (SUI)	0	0	3	3
8	Czechoslovakia (TCH)	0	0	1	1
Totals (8 entries)		8	8	8	24

== Gallery ==
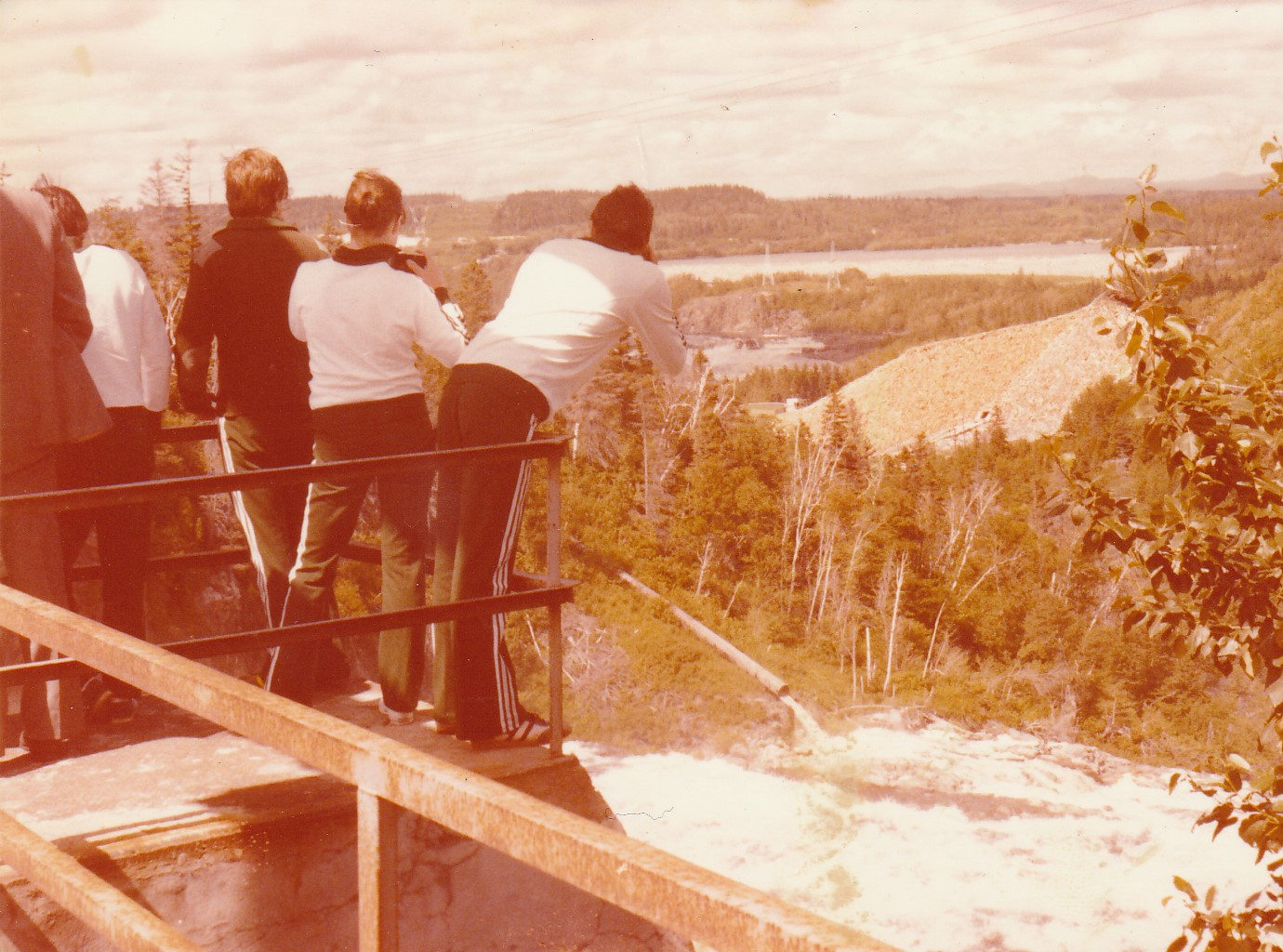
Contestants visiting a local saw mill

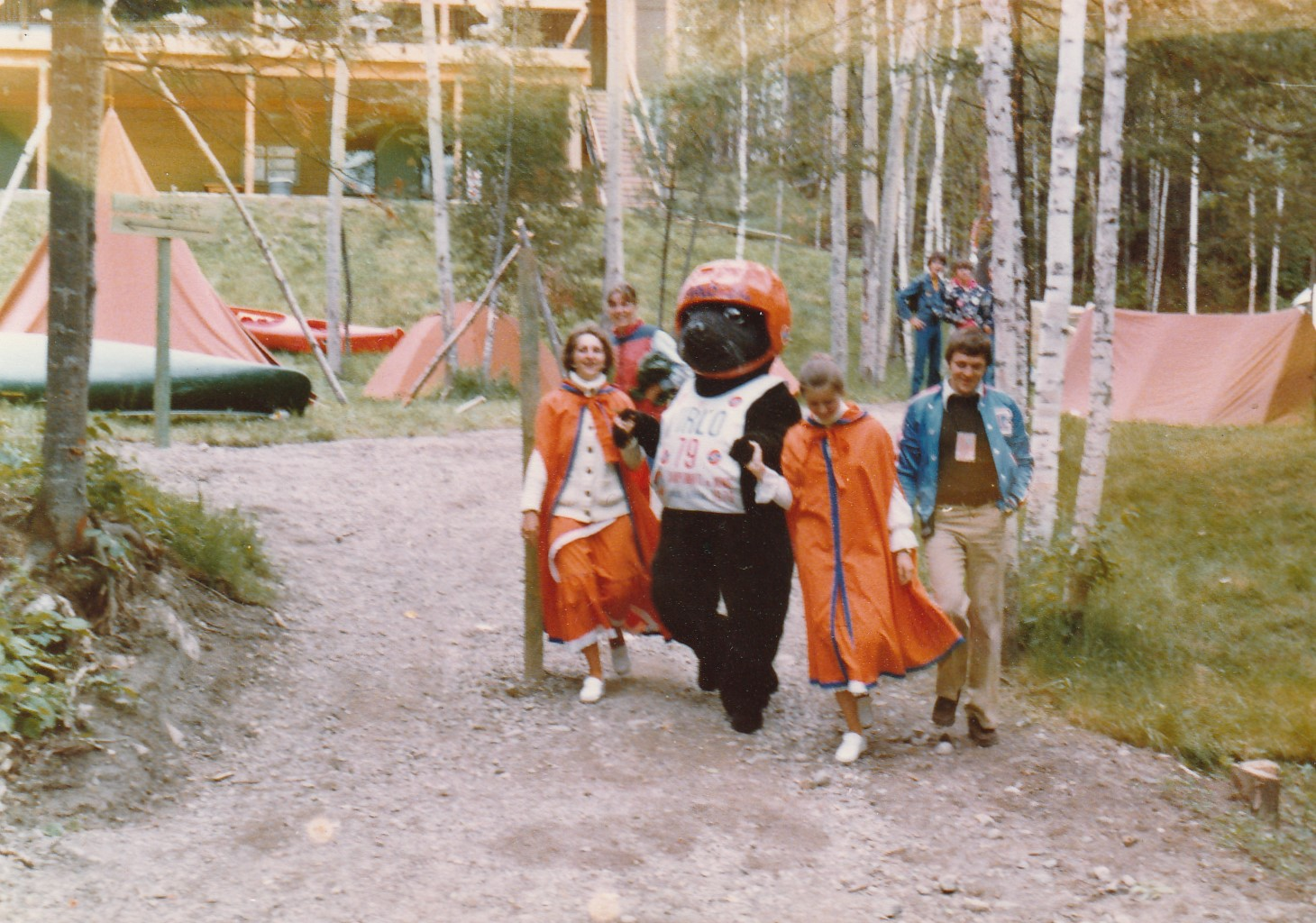
Competition mascot
