= Kalbitz =

Kalbitz is a surname of German origin. Notable people with the surname include:

- Andreas Kalbitz (born 1972), German politician
- Jürgen Kalbitz (fl. 1970s), German slalom canoeist
