= Richard Hernanz =

French canoeist

Medal record

Men's canoe slalom

Representing France

World Championships
Silver medal – second place	1979 Jonquière	C2 team

Richard Hernanz is a former French slalom canoeist who competed at the international level from 1979 to 1981.

He won a silver medal in the C2 team event at the 1979 ICF Canoe Slalom World Championships in Jonquière.

His son Samuel has represented both France and Spain in canoe slalom.
