= Jean Lamy =

French canoeist

Medal record

Men's canoe slalom

Representing France

World Championships
Silver medal – second place	1979 Jonquière	C-2 team

Jean Lamy is a former French slalom canoeist who competed from the late 1970s to the early 1980s. He won a silver medal in the C-2 team event at the 1979 ICF Canoe Slalom World Championships in Jonquière.
