= Udo Werner =

Medal record

Men's canoe slalom

Representing West Germany

World Championships
Silver medal – second place	1979 Jonquière	C-1 team

Udo Werner (born 26 December 1955) is a former West German slalom canoeist who competed from the late 1970s to the mid-1980s. He won a silver medal in the C-1 team event at the 1979 ICF Canoe Slalom World Championships in Jonquière.
