= Allan Edge =

British slalom canoeist

Medal record

Men's canoe slalom

Representing Great Britain

World Championships
Gold medal – first place	1979 Jonquière	K-1 team

Allan Edge is a British former slalom canoeist who competed in the 1970s.

He won a gold medal in the K-1 team event at the 1979 ICF Canoe Slalom World Championships in Jonquière.
