= Cégep de Jonquière =

Public college in Jonquière, Saguenay, Quebec

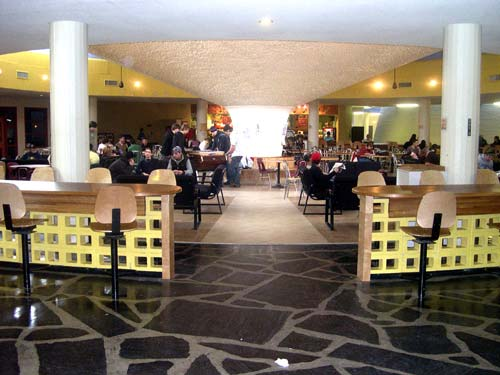
- Other name: Les Gaillards
- Type: Public
- Established: 1967
- Faculty: 330
- Students: 3200
- Location: 2505, rue Saint-Hubert; Saguenay, Quebec; G7X 7W2; 48.4060°N 71.2478°W
- Campus: Urban
- Website: www.cegepjonquiere.ca

The Cégep de Jonquière is a public French-language college located in the Jonquière borough of Saguenay, Quebec, Canada. It is one of four pre-university colleges in the Saguenay – Lac-St-Jean region. It is the largest college in the region.

It was formed through the 1967 merger of the Collège classique de Jonquière (founded 1955 by the Oblat community) and l'École technique d'Arvida (a technical school established in 1948), becoming one of the first public colleges in the province.

The college is known for its unique Art et technologie des médias (ATM) programme, which offers two branches: media communication (Techniques de communication dans les médias) and television production/post-production (Techniques de production et de postproduction télévisuelles).

In addition to the standard technical and pre-university academic programmes, the college houses a collegial technology transfer centre, Centre de Production Automatisé (CPA). Recognised by the provincial education ministry in 1984, this centre offers research and development, technical support and training to private enterprise. "IDEA" is an innovation programme aimed at small and medium-sized businesses.

It also offers a continuing education programme (MASTERA) and a social science study group (le groupe Écobes).

It has a campus in La Malbaie called "Centre d'études collégiales en Charlevoix".

The institution is also known for "Les Gaillards", intercollegiate sports teams in football, basketball, volleyball, soccer, badminton, swimming and cheer-leading.

== Le Centre Linguistique ==
The Cégep is also home to the Centre linguistique du Collège de Jonquière, a long-running French immersion school for teenagers and adults, which serves a clientele which has included many Ottawa civil servants and educators from other provinces who travel to Jonquière to live in French (vivre en français) for periods ranging from a three-week "crash" course to a full fifteen-week academic term. The programme consists of a mix of classroom instruction and sociocultural activities; students are billeted with any of a hundred local host families or live in the campus residences. The college also sends local Jonquière students to anglophone schools in Ottawa as part of an ESL programme.

== Notable students ==
- Christiane Chabot, artist
