= Jean Campbell =

Jean Campbell or Jeanne Campbell may refer to:

- Jean Campbell (baseball), catcher in the All-American Girls Professional Baseball League
- Jean Campbell (canoeist), American slalom canoeist
- Jean Campbell (model), British fashion model
- Jean Campbell (novelist), Australian writer
- Jean Helen St. Clair Campbell, Girl Guide Chief Commissioner
- Jeanne S. Campbell, American fashion designer active 1940s–1970s
- Lady Jeanne Campbell, British socialite, actress, and foreign correspondent
