= Sabine Weiss (canoeist) =

Swiss canoeist

Medal record

Women's canoe slalom

Representing Switzerland

World Championships
Bronze medal – third place	1979 Jonquière	K-1 team

Sabine Weiss is a former Swiss slalom canoeist who competed from the late 1970s to the early 1980s. She won a bronze medal in the K-1 team event at the 1979 ICF Canoe Slalom World Championships in Jonquière.
