= Robert Platt (canoeist) =

French slalom canoeist

Medal record

Men's canoe slalom

Representing France

World Championships
Silver medal – second place	1979 Jonquière	C-2 team

Robert "Roby" Platt (1952-2014) was a French slalom canoeist who competed from the late 1970s to the early 1980s. He won a silver medal in the C-2 team event at the 1979 ICF Canoe Slalom World Championships in Jonquière.
