= Elke Dietze =

West German slalom canoeist

Medal record

Women's canoe slalom

Representing West Germany

World Championships
Silver medal – second place	1979 Jonquière	K1 team

Elke Dietze is a former West German slalom canoeist who competed at the international level in 1979.

She won a silver medal in the K1 team event at the 1979 ICF Canoe Slalom World Championships in Jonquière.
