= Christoph Studer =

Swiss canoeist

Medal record

Men's canoe slalom

Representing Switzerland

World Championships
| Bronze medal – third place | 1979 Jonquière | C-2 team |

Christoph Studer is a former Swiss slalom canoeist who competed from the late 1970s to the mid-1980s. He won a bronze medal in the C-2 team event at the 1979 ICF Canoe Slalom World Championships in Jonquière.
