= Becky Judd =

American canoeist

Medal record

Women's canoe slalom

Representing United States

World Championships
Gold medal – first place	1979 Jonquière	K-1 team

Becky Judd is an American former slalom canoeist who competed in the 1970s and 1980s. She is from Portland, Oregon.

She won a gold medal in the K-1 team event at the 1979 ICF Canoe Slalom World Championships in Jonquière.
