= Brandenburger (surname) =

Brandenburger is a surname. Notable people with this surname include:

- Ernst Brandenburger (fl.1689–1713, his death), Danish architect and master builder
- Martin Brandenburger (fl.1970s), Swiss slalom canoeist
- Nico Brandenburger (born 1995), German footballer
- Pit Brandenburger (born 1995), Luxembourgish swimmer

== See also ==
- Brandenberger (surname)
- Louis V the Brandenburger (1315–1361), Bavarian duke
- Brandenburger, a breed of horse
- Brandenburgers, a WWII-era German special forces unit
- Brandenburg, a state in northeastern Germany which surrounds Berlin
