= Arthur Villeneuve =

Canadian artist (1910-1990)

- Born: January 4, 1910; Chicoutimi, Quebec, Canada
- Died: May 24, 1990 (aged 80); Montreal, Quebec, Canada
- Education: Self-taught
- Spouse(s): Simone Bouchard (m. 1930, d. 1944) Hélène Morin (m. 1945)

Arthur Villeneuve, CM (January 4, 1910 – May 24, 1990) was a Québécois painter and member of the Order of Canada.

== Life before painting ==
Villeneuve was raised in a working-class family in Chicoutimi. His father was a mason, bricklayer, and church choir member. Among his brothers there was a shoesmith turned blacksmith, a locomotive engineer, and an upholsterer.

After leaving school at the age of fourteen, Villeneuve was hired in a paper mill. When he was sixteen he took a winter job as a "chore-boy" in a camp, work which did not hold his interest for long. Finally, in the same year, Villeneuve settled on a career when he became a barber's apprentice. By nineteen years of age Villeneuve had already purchased his first barber shop, the Salon Champlain on rue Sainte-Anne in Chicoutimi. Within three years his business was flourishing and he was secure enough financially to buy two rental properties. He soon sold these in order to buy a restaurant, but all the while maintaining control of, and working long hours at, his salon.

These years of prosperity ended abruptly in 1944 with the death of Villeneuve's first wife, Simone Bouchard, and the loss of his properties. He became a barber at Hôtel-Dieu Hospital in Chicoutimi. Meanwhile, he remarried: his second and last wife was a woman from Rimouski named Hélène Morin.

In total Villeneuve had seven children, four with Simone and three with Hélène. The nine Villeneuves lived in their unpretentious house at 669 rue Taché, Chicoutimi, beginning in 1950.

== The House of Arthur Villeneuve ==
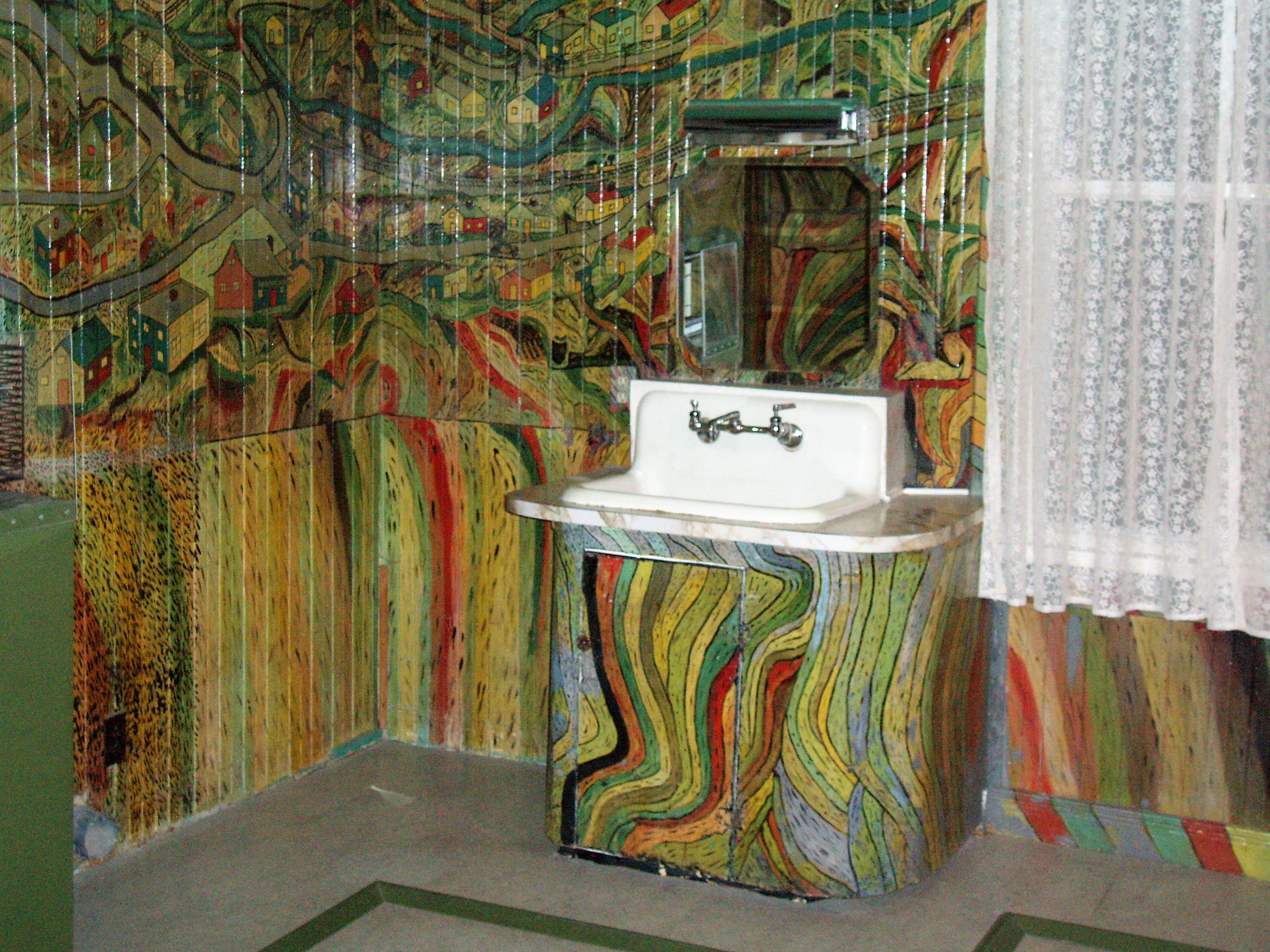
Part of the house of Arthur Villeneuve

== The project ==
Early in his second marriage Villeneuve began experimenting with drawing, collages, and sheet metal sculptures. Among these last there remains an elaborate clock, a ship and a lighthouse, each of which images would become prominent themes in his later platte peinture. But his most famous early work is the house he bought at 669 rue Taché which he nearly completely covered, inside and out, with his first paintings.

The sudden urgency to become an artist on Villeneuve's behalf was attributed by him to a revelation he had in 1946. This decisive moment occurred during the homily at Sunday mass, in which the priest quoted from a letter of Pope Pius XII. The purpose of the letter was to exhort the faithful to make full use of their talents. Villeneuve believed that he had, until then, left his artistic ability untouched, and returned home to set about developing his gift.

Villeneuve began painting frescoes on the outside of his house in April 1957. Still working as a barber, he painted 100 hours per week for 23 months, until he had covered the front facade, the rear, all the interior walls and ceilings, and even the windows of his house. The official opening of the house as an artwork titled the "Musée de l'artiste" took place in 1959. A 1964 film about the artist, Villeneuve, peintre-barbier (Director: Marcel Carrière), by the National Film Board did much to introduce Villeneuve and the project to the public.

Because he was entirely self-taught and completely out of contact with his contemporaries in the painting world, Villeneuve was and is classed among those who practised naive art or primitive art, sometimes called outsider art or simply, popular or people's art. La Pulperie de Chicoutimi calls its permanent exhibit of Villeneuve Far from Naive!.

Since 1993, his house has been regarded as a national heritage asset by the Canadian government, and has held a special place in the history of 20th century Quebec art. In 1994, the house was moved to the interior of Building 21 at the Chicoutimi museum, "La Pulperie". The house and Villeneuve's paintings are on permanent exhibition at La Pulperie to this day.

== Inspiration for the frescoes ==
Villeneuve himself identified several of the sources of his inspiration, both for painting in general and for his particular subject matter. By examining the fresco on the facade of his house, the following sources of inspiration given by Villeneuve for his own work can be illustrated:

- the Saguenay River, its tributaries and their environment
- the omnipresence of the Catholic Church in Quebec
- French-Canadian history
- popular legends of Saguenay-Lac-Saint-Jean
- Villeneuve's "sus-conscient" (Villeneuve's misspoken version of the French subconscient)
- "La Continuance": a neologism coined by Villeneuve
- Surrealism

== Jean-Louis Gagnon Collection ==
In 2016, the Maison Arthur-Villeneuve acquired the collection of Jean-Louis Gagnon which included 200 works by the artist, the most significant acquisition since the purchase of the artist's house.

== Other works ==
After 1950, Villeneuve concentrated solely on painting. In 1972, the Montreal Museum of Fine Arts organized a major retrospective of his work titled Arthur Villeneuve's Quebec chronicles. By 1978, he had painted 2800 canvasses. Conservative estimates place his final output at 3000 paintings. His works range in area from a few square inches to his "favourite" format of 30"x40" to several slightly larger works. In 1978, a 30"x40" painting would be "given away" for the price of $50 (CND), while today a similar work regularly sells in the thousands.

His work is included in many public collections such as the National Gallery of Canada, and the Musée national des beaux-arts du Québec (7 works).
