= Peter Fauster =

Austrian canoeist

Medal record

Men's canoe slalom

Representing Austria

World Championships
Gold medal – first place	1979 Jonquière	K-1
Silver medal – second place	1977 Spittal	K-1 team
Silver medal – second place	1979 Jonquière	K-1 team

Peter Fauster is a former Austrian slalom canoeist who competed in the 1970s. He won three medals at the ICF Canoe Slalom World Championships with a gold (K-1: 1979) and two silvers (K-1 team: 1977, 1979).
