= John Kennedy (canoeist) =

American canoeist

Medal record

Men's canoe slalom

Representing United States

World Championships
Silver medal – second place	1977 Spittal	Mixed C-2

John Kennedy is a former American slalom canoeist who competed in the late 1970s. He won a silver medal in the mixed C-2 event at the 1977 ICF Canoe Slalom World Championships in Spittal.
