= Petra Krol =

Eaat German slalom canoeist

Medal record

Women's canoe slalom

Representing East Germany

World Championships
Silver medal – second place	1975 Skopje	K-1 team
Silver medal – second place	1977 Spittal	K-1
Silver medal – second place	1977 Spittal	K-1 team

Petra Krol is a former East German slalom canoeist who competed in the 1970s. She won three silver medals at the ICF Canoe Slalom World Championships, earning them in 1975 (K-1 team) and 1977 (K-1, K-1 team).
