= David Hearn (canoeist) =

American slalom canoeist (born 1959)

Davey Hearn
Personal information
- Full name: David Carter Hearn
- Born: April 17, 1959 (age 67) Bethesda, Maryland, U.S.
- Height: 5 ft 9 in (1.75 m)
- Weight: 159 lb (72 kg)
- Relative: Cathy Hearn (sister)
Medal record
Representing United States
Men's canoe slalom
World Championships
Gold medal – first place	1979 Jonquière	C1 team
Gold medal – first place	1981 Bala	C1 team
Gold medal – first place	1983 Meran	C1 team
Gold medal – first place	1985 Augsburg	C1
Gold medal – first place	1985 Augsburg	C1 team
Gold medal – first place	1987 Bourg St.-Maurice	C1 team
Gold medal – first place	1989 Savage River	C1 team
Gold medal – first place	1995 Nottingham	C1
Silver medal – second place	1979 Jonquière	C1
Silver medal – second place	1981 Bala	C1
Silver medal – second place	1983 Merano	C1
Silver medal – second place	1987 Bourg St.-Maurice	C1
Silver medal – second place	1989 Savage River	C1
Men's wildwater canoeing
World Championships
Bronze medal – third place	1977 Spittal	C2 team

David Carter Hearn (born April 17, 1959) is a former slalom canoeist who competed from the late 1970s to the early 2000s. He represented the United States at the 1992, 1996, and 2000 Summer Olympics.

He is also known for having faced legal issues with the United States Park Police in 1996 and 2026, although both cases against him were ultimately dropped. In the latter case, which involved the Lincoln Memorial Reflecting Pool, federal prosecutors admitted that the charges had been premised on factual misrepresentations made by the Department of the Interior.

== Career ==
David Hearn was born in 1959 in Bethesda, Maryland. Hearn has said that his decision to begin pursuing a competitive career in canoe slalom came after hearing the news of Jamie McEwan's bronze medal in whitewater slalom at the 1972 Summer Olympics on the radio with his sister Cathy. He would often train at Great Falls with his sister and Jon Lugbill.

Hearn won seven medals in the C1 event at the ICF Canoe Slalom World Championships with two golds (1985, 1995) and five silvers (1979, 1981, 1983, 1987, 1989). He also won six consecutive world championship gold medals in the C1 team event (1979–1989). Hearn competed in three Summer Olympics, earning his best finish of ninth in the C1 event in Atlanta in 1996. Hearn's sister, Cathy, and his ex-brother-in-law, Lecky Haller, also competed in canoe slalom for the United States at the Olympics.

== Legal issues ==
In 1996, Hearn canoed in the Potomac River after heavy rains and was ordered to stop by United States Park Police officers, who asserted that it was dangerous. When he did not stop canoeing, he was arrested on charges of disobeying a police officer and resisting arrest. The charges were dismissed because the Park Police did not have jurisdiction over the portion of the river that he was in. Later that same year, he used his canoeing skills to help Park Police retrieve fishermen who were stranded offshore without life vests.

On June 19, 2026, Hearn was arrested by the United States Park Police on suspicion of damaging government property at the Lincoln Memorial Reflecting Pool in Washington, D.C., after U.S. President Donald Trump falsely claimed that vandals had damaged the pool following its troubled $13.1 million renovation. Hearn denied causing any damage, stating that he had only touched the pool's peeling paint. He was indicted on one count of felony destruction of property on July 2, 2026, and pleaded not guilty on July 9. The Department of Justice moved to dismiss the charges against Hearn on July 31, acknowledging that the damage to the pool resulted from defects in the renovation rather than vandalism. Hearn's lawyers successfully sought to have the charges dropped with prejudice to prevent further prosecutorial harassment, as Executive Branch officials continued to falsely claim that Hearn had damaged the pool despite a lack of evidence. The Department of Justice's Inspector General and the Department of Interior's Inspector General declined to investigate allegations of misconduct against the prosecutors after being asked by Hearn's attorneys.

== World Cup individual podiums ==
	1st place, gold medalist(s)	2nd place, silver medalist(s)	3rd place, bronze medalist(s)	Total
C1	7	8	8	23

Season	Date	Venue	Position	Event
1988	June 19, 1988	Wausau	3rd	C1
1988	June 26, 1988	Savage River	2nd	C1
1988	July 4, 1988	South Bend	1st	C1
1988	August 14, 1988	Nottingham	2nd	C1
1988	August 21, 1988	Augsburg	1st	C1
			3rd	C1
1989			1st	C1
1989			2nd	C1
1989			2nd	C1
1989	August 12, 1989	Mezzana	2nd	C1
1989	August 20, 1989	Tacen	1st	C1
1990	July 1, 1990	Wausau	2nd	C1
1990	1990	Savage River	3rd	C1
1990	August 12, 1990	Augsburg	2nd	C1
1990	August 18, 1990	Bourg St.-Maurice	3rd	C1
1991	July 7, 1991	Augsburg	1st	C1
1993	August 1, 1993	Augsburg	1st	C1
1993	August 31, 1993	Ocoee	1st	C1
1994	July 10, 1994	Bourg St.-Maurice	3rd	C1
1996	September 29, 1996	Três Coroas	3rd	C1
1997	June 22, 1997	Bourg St.-Maurice	2nd	C1
1997	July 28, 1997	Ocoee	3rd	C1
1997	August 3, 1997	Minden	3rd	C1
