= Eduard Wolffhardt =

Austrian canoeist

Medal record

Men's canoe slalom

Representing Austria

World Championships
Silver medal – second place	1977 Spittal	K-1 team
Silver medal – second place	1979 Jonquière	K-1
Silver medal – second place	1979 Jonquière	K-1 team

Eduard Wolffhardt is a former Austrian slalom canoeist who competed from the mid-1970s to the mid-1980s. He won three silver medals at the ICF Canoe Slalom World Championships, earning them in 1977 (K-1 team) and 1979 (K-1, K-1 team).
