= Chicoutimi =

Borough of Saguenay, Quebec, Canada

- Borough
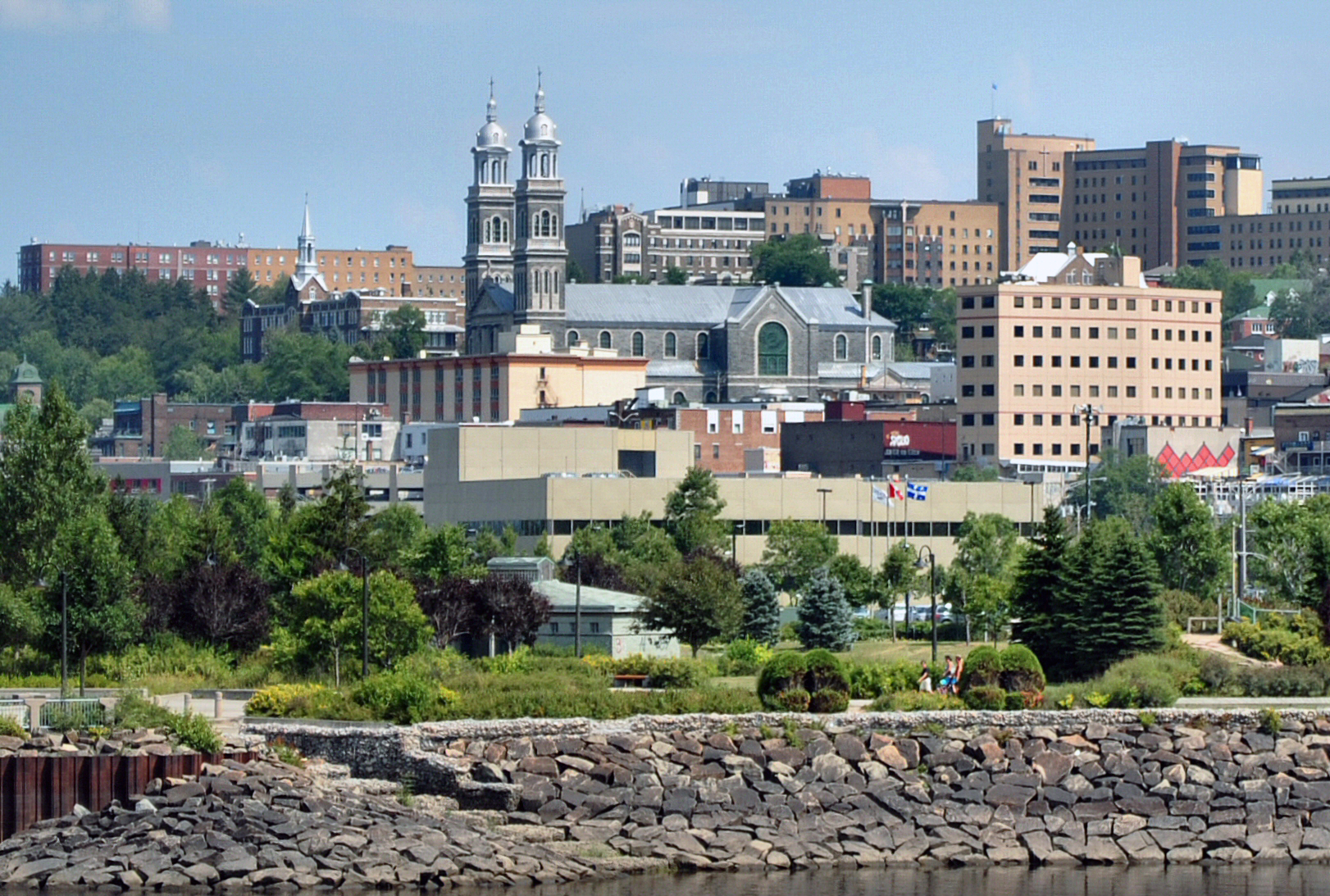
- Downtown Chicoutimi

- Coat of arms
- Nicknames: Queen of the North, Saguenay Queen, Saguenay metropolis, Saguenay kingdom capital, Conventions city (Reine du Nord, Reine du Saguenay, Métropole du Saguenay, Capitale du royaume du Saguenay, Ville des congrès)
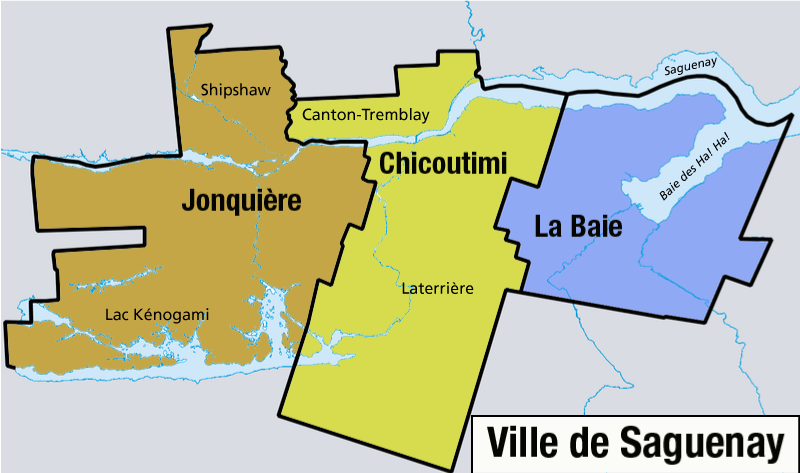
- Coordinates: 48°25′40″N 71°03′33″W
- Country: Canada
- Province: Quebec
- Region: Saguenay–Lac-Saint-Jean
- City: Saguenay

Government
  - Borough president: Michel Tremblay
- Website: Borough Council of Chicoutimi

Chicoutimi (/ʃɪˈkuːtɪmi/ shih-KOO-tim-ee, French: [ʃikutimi]) is the most populous borough (arrondissement) of the city of Saguenay in Quebec, Canada.

It is situated at the confluence of the Saguenay and Chicoutimi rivers. During the 20th century, it became the main administrative and commercial centre of the Saguenay–Lac-Saint-Jean region. In 2002 it merged into the new city of Saguenay and forms the heart of the 5th-largest urban area of the province of Quebec. At the 2021 census, its population was 69,004.

== History ==
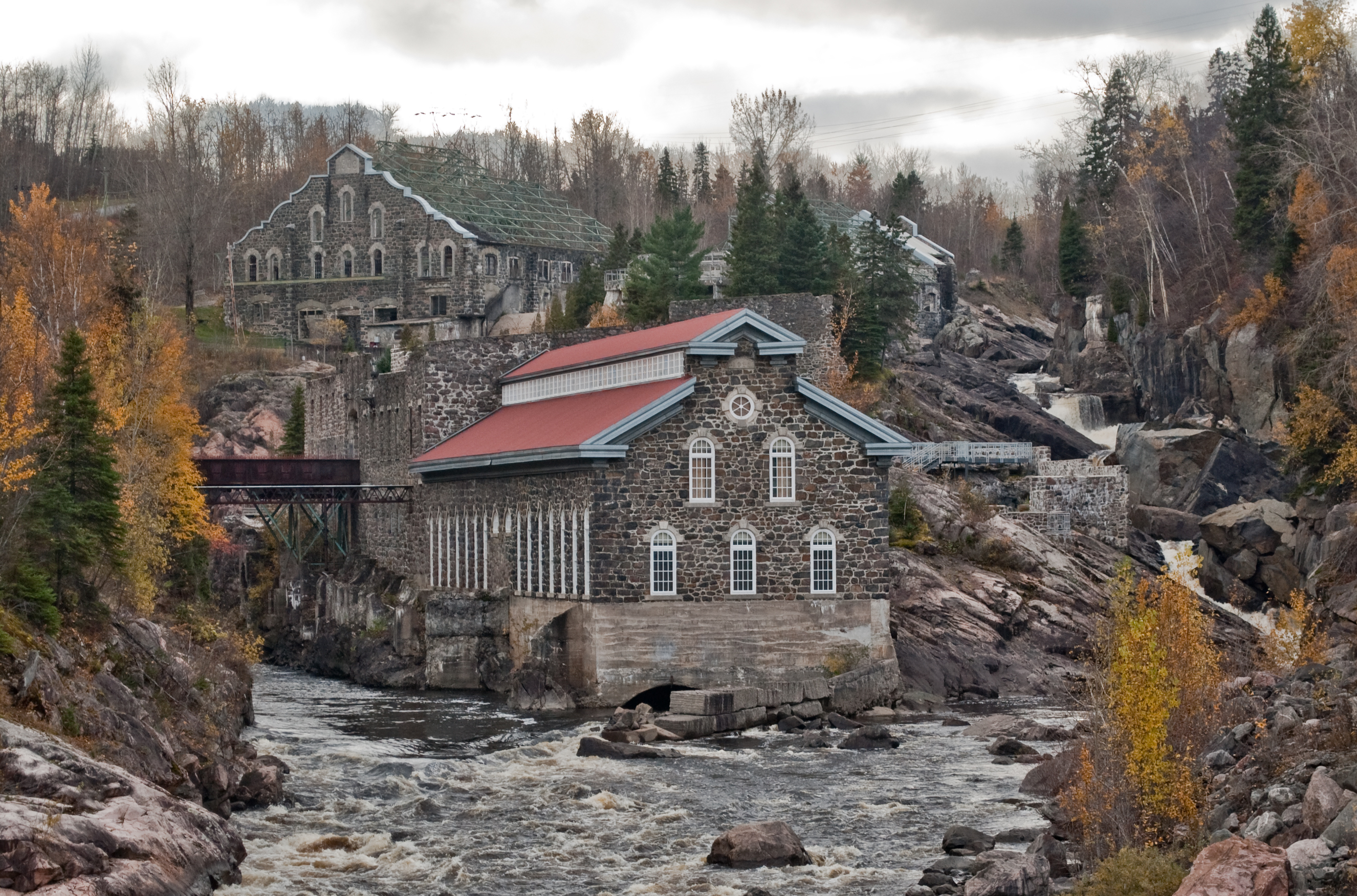
Old Chicoutimi Pulp Mill, an early 20th-century industrial complex in operation from 1898 to 1930

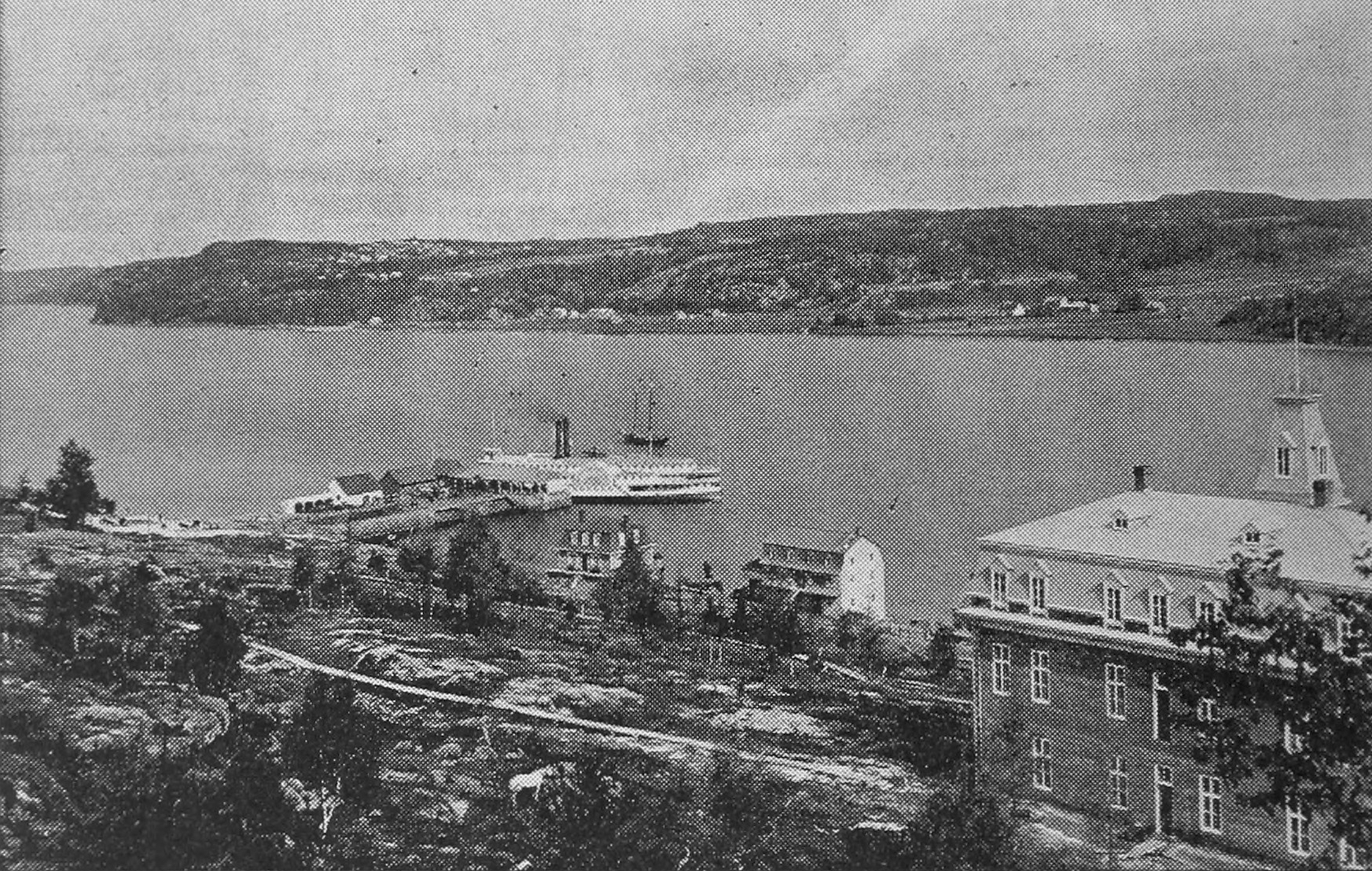
Chicoutimi, 1893

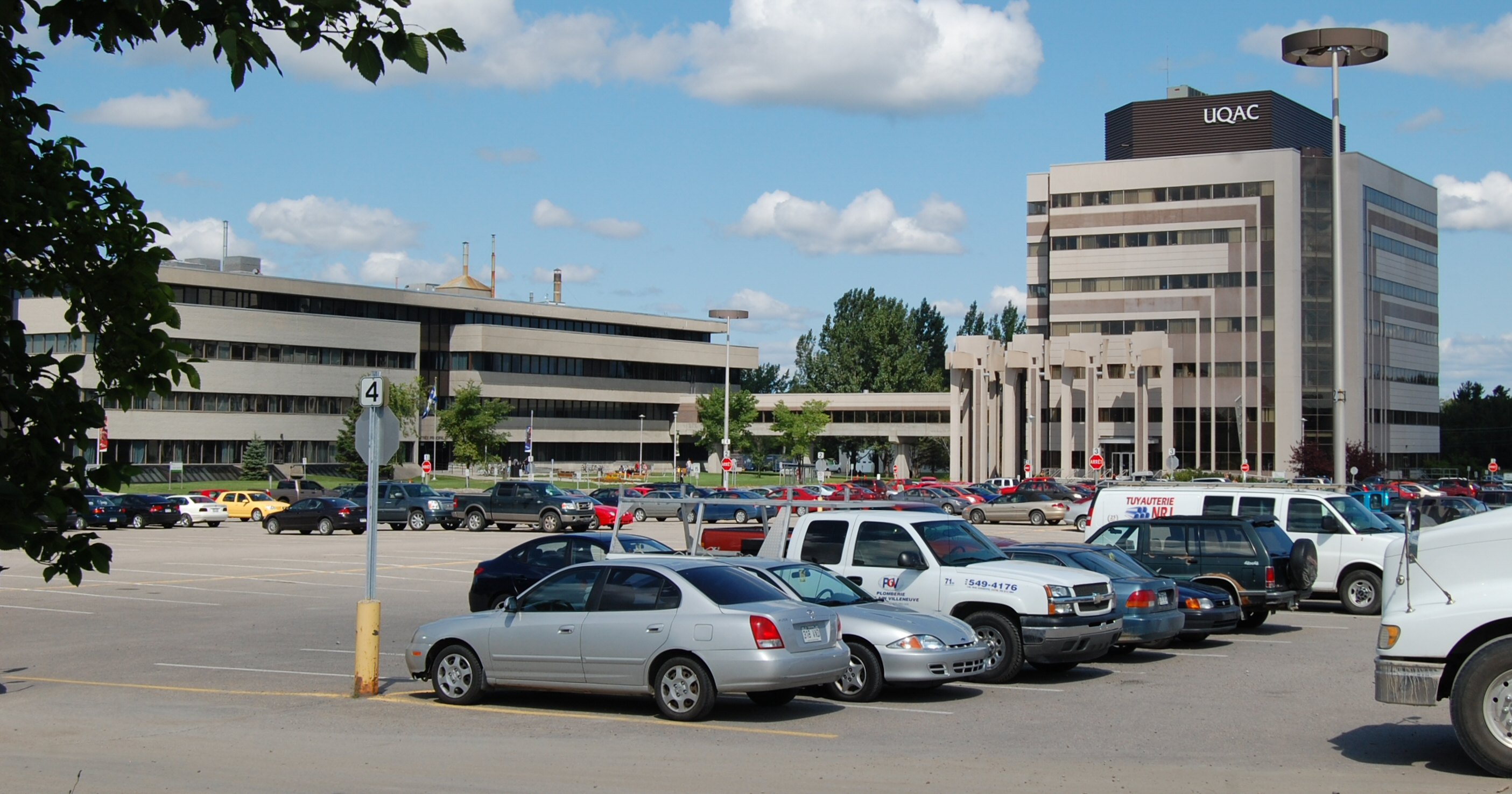
The Université du Québec à Chicoutimi main buildings

What was ultimately to become the centre of the borough of Chicoutimi was first settled by French colonists in 1676 as a trading post in the fur trade. At that time, the Saguenay and the Chicoutimi rivers had been used as waterways by the Montagnais tribes for centuries. The name Chicoutimi derives from the Innu for 'the end of the deep water'. After the British seized Lower Canada, the Chicoutimi trading post continued to operate only until 1782, as the fur trade had moved further west of the Great Lakes.

The city of Chicoutimi was officially incorporated in 1845 as a municipality by Peter McLeod, a Métis timber contractor who built a sawmill there in 1842. The town was designated in 1855 as the seat of Chicoutimi County and the seat of the Roman Catholic Diocese of Chicoutimi in 1878.

The arrival of the Canadian National Railway in 1893 stimulated the growth of Chicoutimi's pulp and paper industries, particularly mechanical pulp production. The railway also built Chicoutimi station, which served the city until 1988. The Chicoutimi Pulp Co. was founded in 1896 backed by French-Canadian investors. The Chicoutimi Pulp Mill became the biggest producer of mechanical pulp in Canada by 1910.

Since the Great Depression, the city has become an administrative and commercial centre. New centres of education and culture were established: in 1967, the Conservatoire de musique de Saguenay; and in 1969, the Université du Québec à Chicoutimi. The city also played host to the Quebec Summer Games in 1972.

In the municipal amalgamations of 1976, Chicoutimi annexed the neighbouring towns of Chicoutimi-Nord and Rivière-du-Moulin. In a much larger round of Municipal reorganization in Quebec in 2002, the cities of Chicoutimi, Jonquière, La Baie, Lac-Kénogami, Laterrière, Shipshaw and part of Tremblay merged to form the new city of Saguenay. Chicoutimi became a borough of Saguenay.

During the summer of 1996, a record rainfall in the region caused major flooding in the downtown, as well as outlying areas. Dams were overrun, many bridges were destroyed throughout the region. The total cost of the disaster was recorded as 1.5 billion Canadian dollars. The flood also killed seven people.

Chicoutimi is home to a large UPS facility serving the greater Quebec area.

Chicoutimi's sister city is Camrose, Alberta.

== Geography and cityscape ==
Chicoutimi is located in Saguenay–Lac-Saint-Jean region on the western end of the Saguenay Fjord; most of the borough, including the downtown section, is on the south shore of the Saguenay River. It is the geographical centre of the city of Saguenay; the Jonquière and La Baie boroughs adjoin on the west and east sides. Chicoutimi is about 200 kilometres (120 miles) north of Quebec City and 126 kilometres (78 miles) northwest upriver from Tadoussac, at the confluence of the St. Lawrence River. The former cities of Chicoutimi borough are Chicoutimi, Laterrière, Canton-Tremblay, Chicoutimi-Nord and Rivière-du-Moulin. They have maintained their names as wards in the amalgamated city.

The landscape of Chicoutimi consists of hills, valleys and plains, with the terrain becoming steeper near the Saguenay River. Its two major physical features are the Saguenay Graben, a rift valley of the Laurentian Highlands in which the city spreads, and the Saguenay Fjord, the glacier-carved steep shores of the Saguenay River. Mount Valin at 3,215 feet (980 metres) is the tallest mountain of the region, and overlooks Chicoutimi 30 kilometres (19 miles) north-east. The Chicoutimi, Du Moulin and Valin rivers all empty in the Saguenay river in Chicoutimi.

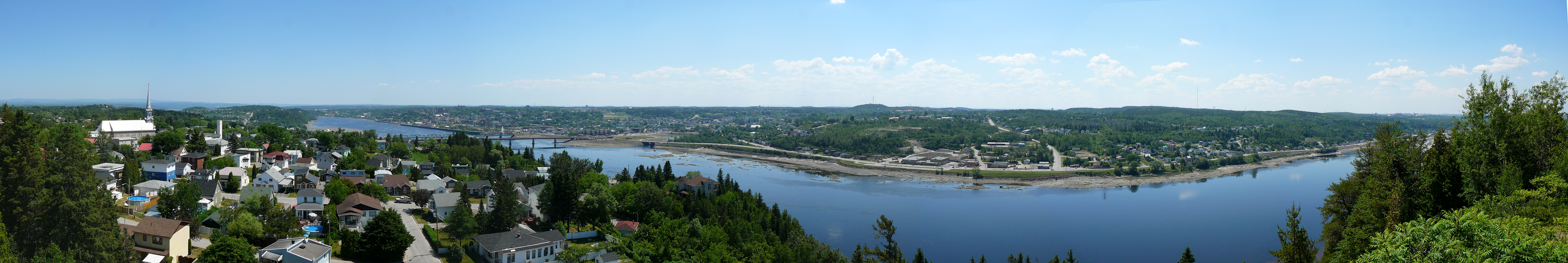
Panoramic view of the Saguenay River from St Anne's Cross (north shore) with downtown Chicoutimi in the background

== Culture ==
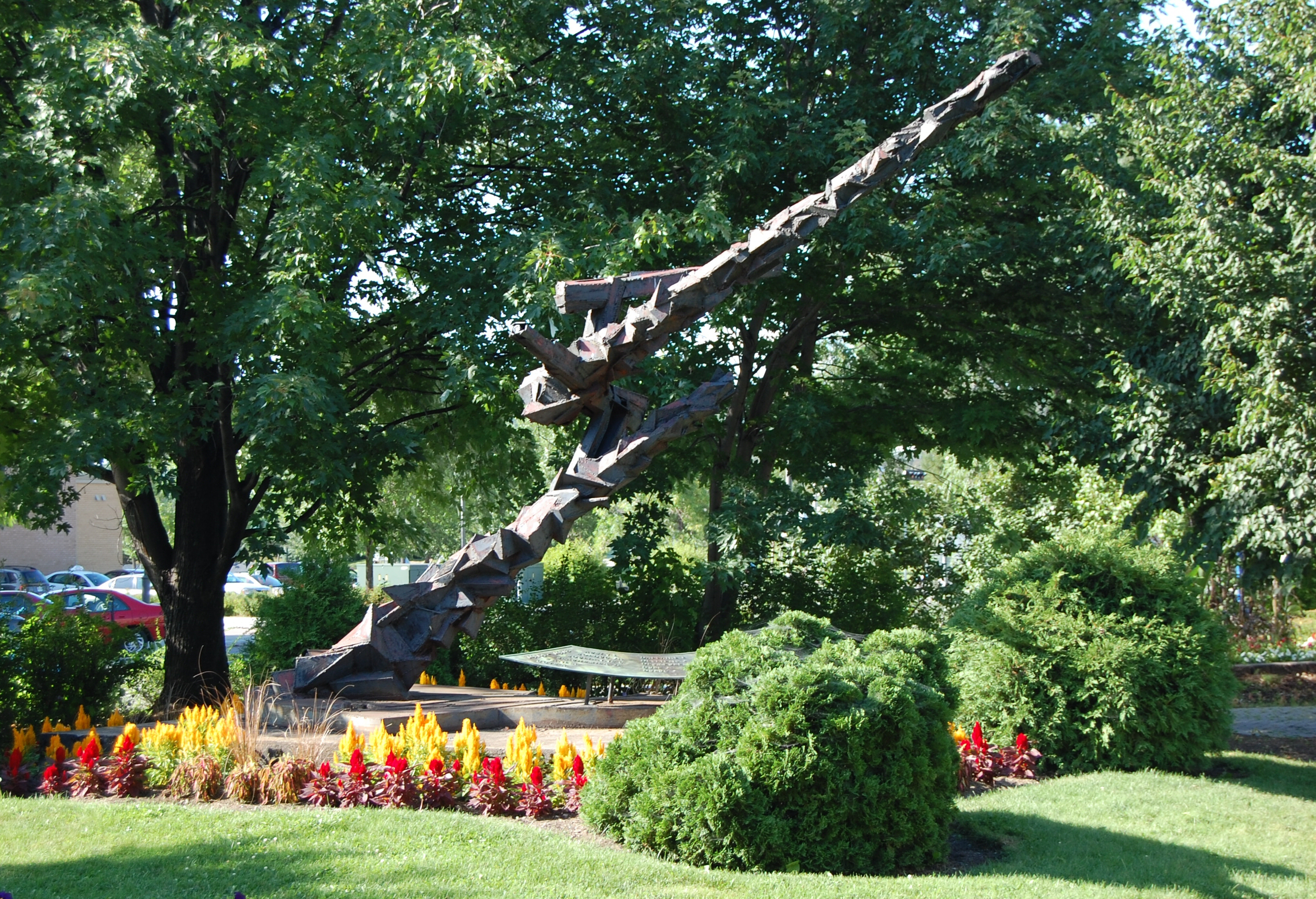
Armand Vaillancourt's Cenotaph in Chicoutimi

=== Sports ===
The city has been home to the QMJHL's Chicoutimi Saguenéens since 1973. They play at the Centre Georges-Vézina.

Cycles Devinci started here in 1987.

=== Professional hockey players from Chicoutimi ===
- Luc Dufour
- Johnny Gagnon
- Leo Gaudreault
- Sylvain Locas
- John Smrke
- Georges Vezina

== Law and government ==
Residents of Chicoutimi are represented by three tiers of government. The first are the city councillors elected from single-member districts and the mayor elected at-large for the city of Saguenay. At the provincial tier, two elected members serve in the National Assembly of Quebec for the provincial ridings of Chicoutimi and Dubuc. The federal representation consists of a members of parliament serving in the Parliament of Canada for the federal riding of Chicoutimi—Le Fjord.

== International relations ==
=== Twin towns – sister cities ===
Chicoutimi is twinned with:

- Angoulême, France

== Notable people ==
- Marilyn Bergeron
- Johnny Gagnon
- Christian Genest, Professor of Statistics, McGill University
- John Kricfalusi
- Kevin Lambert, writer
- René Simard
- Charles Sirois
- Larry Tremblay
- Thomas-Louis Tremblay
- Georges Vézina
- Arthur Villeneuve
- Élisabeth Vonarburg, author
- Jeanick Fournier, singer and winner of Canada's Got Talent (season 2)
- Angine de Poitrine
