= Lutz Körner =

German slalom canoeist

Medal record

Men's canoe slalom

Representing East Germany

World Championships
Gold medal – first place	1977 Spittal	C-1 team

Lutz Körner is a former East German slalom canoeist who competed in the 1970s. He won a gold medal in the K-1 team event at the 1977 ICF Canoe Slalom World Championships in Spittal.
