= Matthias Hirsch =

Swiss canoeist

Medal record

Men's canoe slalom

Representing Switzerland

World Championships
Silver medal – second place	1977 Spittal	C-2 team

Matthias Hirsch is a former Swiss slalom canoeist who competed in the 1970s. He won a silver medal in the C-2 team event at the 1977 ICF Canoe Slalom World Championships in Spittal.
