= Kazimierz Gawlikowski =

Polish canoeist

Medal record

Men's canoe slalom

Representing Poland

World Championships
Bronze medal – third place	1977 Spittal	K-1 team

Kazimierz Gawlikowski is a former Polish slalom canoeist who competed from the late 1970s to the late 1980s. He won a bronze medal in the K-1 team event at the 1977 ICF Canoe Slalom World Championships in Spittal.
