= Brandenberger =

Brandenberger is a surname. Notable people with the surname include:

- Erich Brandenberger (1892–1955), German general in the Wehrmacht of Nazi Germany during World War II
- Hans Brandenberger (1912–2003), Swiss sculptor
- Jacques E. Brandenberger (1872–1954), Swiss chemist and textile engineer
- Robert Brandenberger (born 1956), Swiss-Canadian theoretical cosmologist and a professor of physics

== See also ==
- Brandenberger Ache, a river of Bavaria (Germany)
- Brandenberger Alps, a sub-group of the Northern Limestone Alps (Austria)
- Brandenberger Bluff, a steep rock bluff (Marie Byrd Land, West Antarctica)
- Brandenburger (surname)
