= Bernd Kast =

German canoeist

Personal information
- Full name: Bernhard Kast
- Nationality: German
- Born: 8 September 1948 Augsburg, Germany
- Died: 30 November 2022 (aged 74) Ulm, Germany

Sport
- Sport: Canoeing
- Event: Wildwater canoeing
Medal record
Event	1st	2nd	3rd
World Championships	4	2	3

Bernhard "Bernd" Kast (8 September 1948 – 30 November 2022) was a West German male canoeist who won nine medals at senior level the Wildwater Canoeing World Championships.

== Achievements ==
Year	Competition	Venue	Rank	Event	Time
Representing West Germany
1969	World Championships	(France) Bourg-Saint-Maurice	1st	K1 classic team	
1971	World Championships	(Italy) Merano	1st	K1 classic	
1971	World Championships	(Italy) Merano	1st	K1 classic team	
1973	World Championships	(Switzerland) Muotathal	2nd	K1 classic	
1973	World Championships	(Switzerland) Muotathal	1st	K1 classic team	
1975	World Championships	(Socialist Federal Republic of Yugoslavia) Skopie	3rd	K1 classic	
1975	World Championships	(Socialist Federal Republic of Yugoslavia) Skopie	3rd	K1 classic team	
1977	World Championships	(Austria) Spittal	3rd	K1 classic	
1977	World Championships	(Austria) Spittal	2nd	K1 classic team	
