= Kym Purdy =

Australian canoeist

Medal record

Women's canoe slalom

Representing Australia

World Championships
Bronze medal – third place	1977 Spittal	Mixed C-2

Kym Purdy is a former Australian slalom canoeist who competed in the late 1970s. She won a bronze medal in the mixed C-2 event at the 1977 ICF Canoe Slalom World Championships in Spittal.
