= Miroslav Nedvěd =

Czechoslovak slalom canoeist

Medal record

Men's canoe slalom

Representing Czechoslovakia

World Championships
Gold medal – first place	1977 Spittal	C-2 team
Silver medal – second place	1977 Spittal	C-2

Miroslav Nedvěd is a former Czechoslovak slalom canoeist who competed in the 1970s. He won two medals at the 1977 ICF Canoe Slalom World Championships in Spittal with a gold in the C-2 team event and a silver in the C-2 event.
