= Samuel Hernanz =

French-born Spanish slalom canoeist (born 1986)

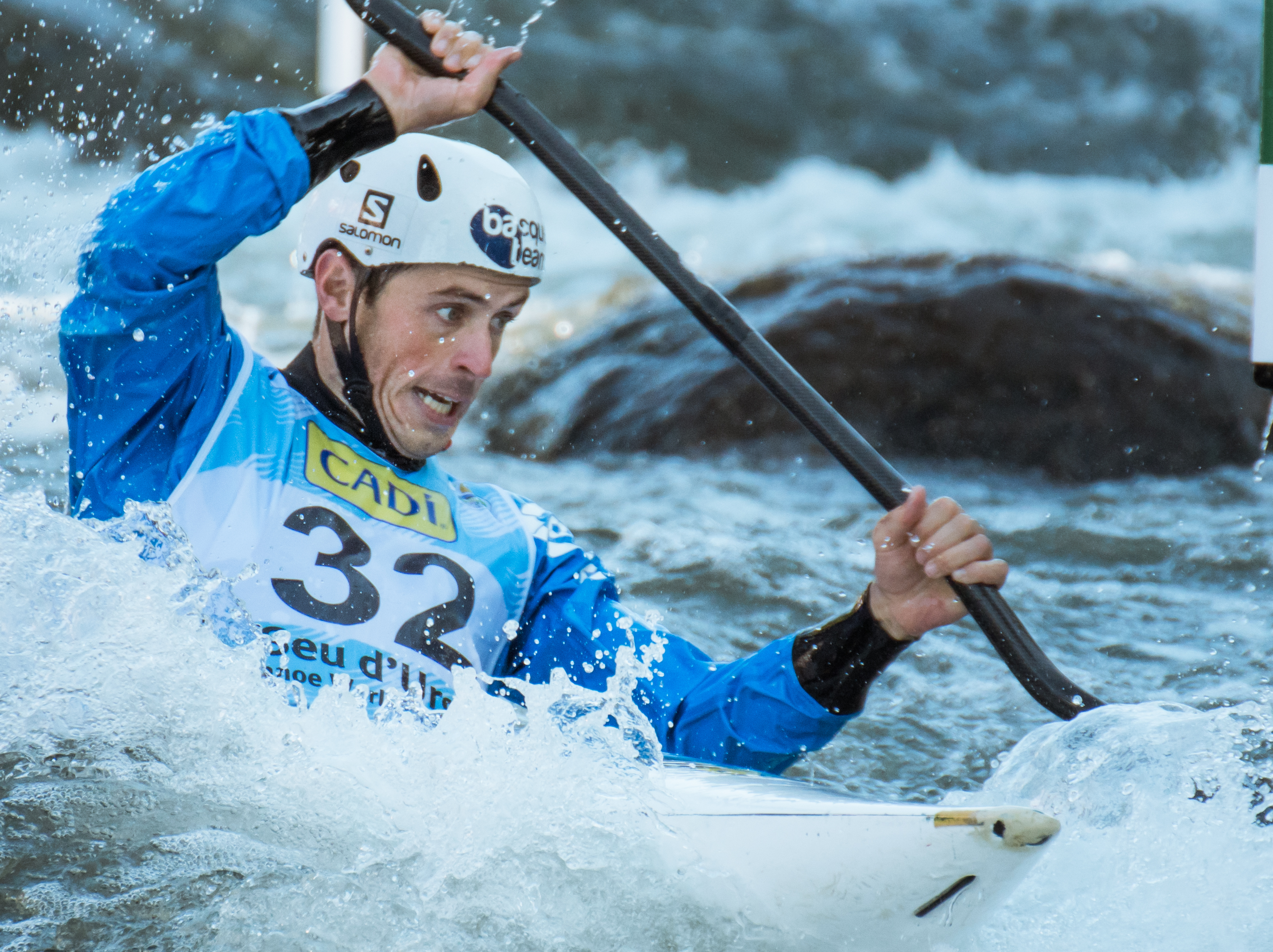

Personal information
- Nationality: Spanish
- Born: 15 April 1986 (age 40) Tarbes, France
- Height: 1.80 m (5 ft 11 in)
- Weight: 75 kg (165 lb)

Sport
- Country: Spain
- Sport: Canoe slalom
- Event: K1
- Club: Atlético San Sebastian
Medal record
Men's canoe slalom
Representing France
Junior World Championships
Gold medal – first place	2004 Lofer	K1 team
Representing Spain
World Championships
Gold medal – first place	2019 La Seu d'Urgell	K1 team
European Championships
Silver medal – second place	2011 La Seu d'Urgell	K1
Bronze medal – third place	2014 Vienna	K1
Bronze medal – third place	2016 Liptovský Mikuláš	K1 team
U23 European Championships
Bronze medal – third place	2008 Solkan	K1
Bronze medal – third place	2009 Liptovský Mikuláš	K1

Samuel Hernanz Obrador (Spanish pronunciation: [saˈmwel eɾˈnanθ oβɾaˈðoɾ]; born 15 April 1986) is a French-born Spanish slalom canoeist who has competed at the international level since 2004 He represented France in his first international season.

Hernanz won a gold medal in the K1 team event at the 2019 ICF Canoe Slalom World Championships in La Seu d'Urgell. He also won one silver and two bronzes at the European Championships.

At the 2012 Summer Olympics he competed in the K1 event where he finished in 5th place.

His father Richard represented France in canoe slalom.

== World Cup individual podiums ==
Season	Date	Venue	Position	Event
2011	2 Jul 2011	L'Argentière-la-Bessée	2nd	K1
2013	6 Jul 2013	La Seu d'Urgell	3rd	K1
2014	2 Aug 2014	La Seu d'Urgell	1st	K1
2015	8 Aug 2015	La Seu d'Urgell	2nd	K1
2016	18 Jun 2016	Pau	1st	K1
