= Martin Brandenburger =

Swiss slalom canoeist

Medal record

Men's canoe slalom

Representing Switzerland

World Championships
Bronze medal – third place	1979 Jonquière	K-1 team

Martin Brandenburger is a former Swiss slalom canoeist who competed in the 1970s. He won a bronze medal in the K-1 team event at the 1979 ICF Canoe Slalom World Championships in Jonquière.
