= Boroughs of Saguenay, Quebec =

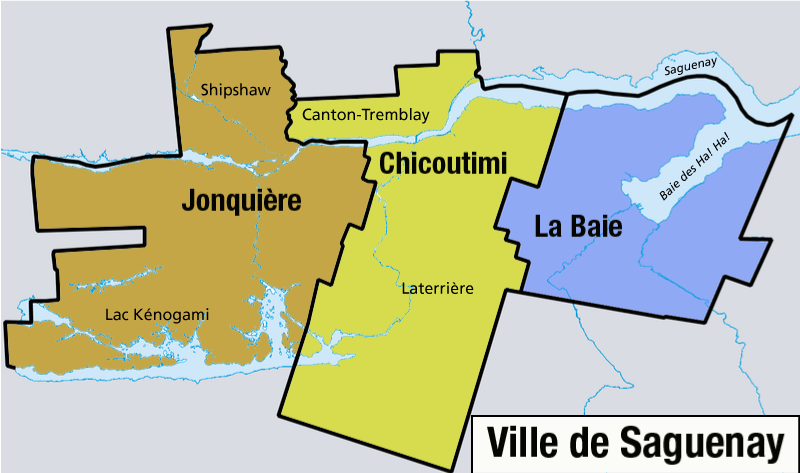
Map of the three boroughs of Saguenay, Quebec

Saguenay, Quebec is divided into three boroughs (French: arrondissements).

- Chicoutimi
- Jonquière
- La Baie

These were former cities which ceased to exist on February 18, 2002, when they were amalgamated into the expanded city of Saguenay.

The amalgamation involved the following cities and municipalities in addition to the above:

- the Municipality of Lac-Kénogami (now part of Jonquière borough)
- the City of Laterrière (now part of Chicoutimi borough)
- the Municipality of Shipshaw (now part of Jonquière borough)
- part of the Township of Tremblay (now part of Chicoutimi borough; the rest of it was annexed to Saint-Honoré)
