= Jon Lugbill =

American canoeist (born 1961)

Medal record

Men's canoe slalom

Representing United States

World Championships
Gold medal – first place	1979 Jonquière	C1
Gold medal – first place	1979 Jonquière	C1 team
Gold medal – first place	1981 Bala	C1
Gold medal – first place	1981 Bala	C1 team
Gold medal – first place	1983 Meran	C1
Gold medal – first place	1983 Meran	C1 team
Gold medal – first place	1985 Augsburg	C1 team
Gold medal – first place	1987 Bourg St.-Maurice	C1
Gold medal – first place	1987 Bourg St.-Maurice	C1 team
Gold medal – first place	1989 Savage River	C1
Gold medal – first place	1989 Savage River	C1 team
Gold medal – first place	1991 Tacen	C1 team
Silver medal – second place	1985 Augsburg	C1

Jon Phillip Lugbill (born 1961) is an American former slalom canoeist who competed at the international level from 1975 to 1995, specializing in the C1 event. He is the only slalom canoeist to ever appear on the Wheaties box.

== Career ==
Lugbill started canoeing in the 1970s in the Washington, D.C. area. He often trained daily in his C1 using slalom gates set up on a feeder canal next to the Potomac River near Great Falls. During the winter, Lugbill and his fellow paddlers also trained in the David Taylor Model Basin. He and some other fellow racers (notably David Hearn) developed new designs of low volume decked canoes, using nylon, kevlar and fiberglass cloths mixed with epoxy resin.

In 1979, Lugbill won the C1 men's individual World Championship in canoe slalom at the first World Championships to be held on the North American continent at Jonquière (Canada). This was the first time an American had won an individual gold medal in the world canoe slalom championships. Lugbill went on to win gold in his category several more times; 1981 at Bala (Wales), 1983 at Meran (Italy), 1987 at Bourg St. Maurice (France), and 1989 at the Savage River (USA). In 1985 at Augsburg (then in West Germany), Lugbill had to settle for the silver medal after David Hearn bested him for the gold. Lugbill also won seven consecutive world championship gold medals in the C1 team event (1979-1991). His older brother Ron was part of the gold medal winning C1 team in 1981.

Lugbill won three consecutive overall world cup titles in the C1 category including the inaugural edition in 1988.

During the peak of Lugbill's career, whitewater canoeing was not included on the competition program of the Summer Olympic Games. His only appearance on the Olympic stage came in 1992, when the sport returned to the Olympics after a 20-year absence. On the man-made course in La Seu d'Urgell, Spain, Lugbill placed fourth after being assessed for a five-second gate touch penalty at Gate 23 during his first run.

In 2025, Lugbill retired after 32 years as the executive director of Metropolitan Richmond Sports Backers.

== Personal life ==
Lugbill lived in Archbold, Ohio until he was three years old. Then he moved to Vienna and then Fairfax, Virginia. He attended Lanier Intermediate School in Fairfax and Oakton High School. He graduated from the University of Virginia. He has two daughters and he lives in Richmond, Virginia.

== World Cup individual podiums ==
	1st place, gold medalist(s)	2nd place, silver medalist(s)	3rd place, bronze medalist(s)	Total
C1	11	6	0	17

Season	Date	Venue	Position	Event
1988	19 June 1988	Wausau	1st	C1
1988	26 June 1988	Savage River	1st	C1
1988	7 August 1988	Dublin	2nd	C1
1988	14 August 1988	Nottingham	1st	C1
1988	21 August 1988	Augsburg	2nd	C1
1989			1st	C1
1989			1st	C1
1989	12 August 1989	Mezzana	1st	C1
1989	15 August 1989	Augsburg	1st	C1
1990	1 July 1990	Wausau	1st	C1
1990	1990	Savage River	1st	C1
1990	12 August 1990	Augsburg	1st	C1
1990	25 August 1990	Tacen	2nd	C1
1991	30 June 1991	Mezzana	2nd	C1
1991	10 July 1991	Reals	2nd	C1
1991	25 August 1991	Minden	2nd	C1
1991	1 September 1991	Wausau	1st	C1
