= Christiane Chabot =

French-Canadian artist (born 1950)

- Born: December 17, 1950 (age 75); Jonquière, Quebec, Canada
- Education: Cégep de Jonquière; Université Laval 1975; École des Beaux-Arts
- Known for: Painter; Sculptor; Installation artist Photographer; Graphic artist
- Website: www.christianechabot.com

Christiane Chabot (French: [kʁistjan ʃabo]; born 17 December 1950) is a French-Canadian artist. She is a multidisciplinary artist, working in the fields of painting, pastels, watercolors, sculpture, installation art, photography and also computer and video graphics.

== Life and work ==
Christiane Chabot was born in December 1950 in Jonquière, Quebec. Chabot studied plastic arts at the Cégep de Jonquière from 1969 until 1971, followed by studying visual art at the Université Laval from 1972 to 1975. She attended the École des Beaux-Arts twice, first in 1976–1977 and again in 1981–1982.

She holds a dual citizenship for France and Canada. She works and lives in Paris and Montreal.

The mix of work during the early years, drawing, painting, etching and photography, led towards the opening up of an interdisciplinary perspective that has progressively become firmly established in recent years, with the inclusion of such spheres as sculpture, installations, video and computer graphics.

== Notable collections ==
- Hommage à Raphaël, painting, 1979, Musée national des beaux-arts du Québec
