= Birgit Feydt =

Medal record

Women's canoe slalom

Representing East Germany

World Championships
| Silver medal – second place | 1977 Spittal | K-1 team |

Birgit Feydt is a former East German slalom canoeist who competed in the 1970s. She won a silver medal in the K-1 team event at the 1977 ICF Canoe Slalom World Championships in Spittal.
