= Lecky Haller =

American canoeist

Medal record

Men's canoe slalom

Representing United States

World Championships
Gold medal – first place	1983 Merano	C2
Silver medal – second place	1983 Meran	C2 team
Silver medal – second place	1987 Bourg St.-Maurice	C2
Bronze medal – third place	1985 Augsburg	C2 team

Jacob Alexander "Lecky" Haller (born 2 August 1957 in Glencoe, Maryland) is an American slalom canoeist who competed from the early 1980s to the early 2000s. He won four medals at the ICF Canoe Slalom World Championships with a gold (C2: 1983), two silvers (C2: 1987, C2 team: 1983) and a bronze (C2 team: 1985).

He first attended Johns Hopkins University as a freshman lacrosse recruit. However, he transferred to Washington College for his remaining three years where he continued his lacrosse career. Haller also pledged Phi Gamma Delta (Fiji) and was his class's PCP. In 1979 he became an All American honorable mention, and in 1980 he made the first team for All American Lacrosse. Lecky graduated from Washington College in 1981 with a bachelor's in history. After graduation, Haller started his paddling career until 1992. He worked briefly as a 7th grade teacher at French Broad River Academy in Asheville. He currently works at Asheville School, In Asheville, North Carolina. While working at this institution he has held many jobs including, football coach, ski team instructor, head men's lacrosse coach, and mountaineering staff. Currently, Haller works as the Assistant Director of the Mountaineering department and leads the ski team on their trips to the semi-local ski resort Cataloochee. He is a 15-time National Champion and a two-time Olympian.

Haller also competed in two Summer Olympics, earning his best finish of fourth in the C2 event in Barcelona in 1992. In 1996 he was ranked Number 1 in the world for men's C2. In 2000 at the Sydney Olympics Haller finished 12th with partner, Matt Taylor.

In 1988 he won the inaugural overall World Cup title in the C2 category partnering Jamie McEwan, who was his C2 partner until 1992. He was also partnered by his younger brother Fritz Haller and Matt Taylor during his career. He is arguably the best American C2 paddler ever and is the only one to win a world cup gold in Prague, Czech Republic and also the only American to ever win a medal in Japan, a world cup gold at the Asahi World Cup, both times partnering with his brother Fritz.

His ex-wife, Cathy Hearn, and his ex-brother-in-law, David Hearn, also competed in canoe slalom for the United States.

== World Cup individual podiums ==
	1st place, gold medalist(s)	2nd place, silver medalist(s)	3rd place, bronze medalist(s)	Total
C2	4	9	3	16

Season	Date	Venue	Position	Event
1988	26 June 1988	Savage River	2nd	C2
1988	2 July 1988	Minden	1st	C2
1988	4 July 1988	South Bend	1st	C2
1989			2nd	C2
1989	15 August 1989	Augsburg	2nd	C2
1989	20 August 1989	Tacen	2nd	C2
1990	26 August 1990	Tacen	2nd	C2
1991	25 August 1991	Minden	2nd	C2
1992	20 June 1992	Bourg St.-Maurice	2nd	C2
1993	31 August 1993	Ocoee	3rd	C2
1994	18 September 1994	Asahi, Aichi	1st	C2
1995	25 June 1995	Prague	1st	C2
1995	1 October 1995	Ocoee	2nd	C2
1996	16 June 1996	Augsburg	2nd	C2
1996	29 September 1996	Três Coroas	3rd	C2
1998	2 August 1998	Wausau	3rd	C2
