= Hardy Künzli =

Medal record

Men's canoe slalom

Representing Switzerland

World Championships
Bronze medal – third place	1979 Jonquière	C-2 team

Hardy Künzli is a former Swiss slalom canoeist who competed in the 1970s. He won a bronze medal in the C-2 team event at the 1979 ICF Canoe Slalom World Championships in Jonquière.
