= Bob Robison =

American canoeist

Medal record

Men's canoe slalom

Representing United States

World Championships
Gold medal – first place	1979 Jonquière	C-1 team
Bronze medal – third place	1979 Jonquière	C-1

Bob Robison is an American former slalom canoeist who competed from the late 1970s to the early 1990s. He won two medals at the 1979 ICF Canoe Slalom World Championships in Jonquière, Quebec, with a gold in the C-1 team event and a bronze in the C-1 event.

Robison co-founded travel management software company Outtask, Inc. which was subsequently acquired by Concur Technologies in January 2006. He remained with the merged company, leading Concur's global services until after the SAP- Concur acquisition in 2014. Robison currently resides in the Washington, D.C., area with his wife and three daughters.
