= Linda Aponte =

American slalom canoeist

Medal record

Women's canoe slalom

Representing United States

World Championships
Silver medal – second place	1977 Spittal	Mixed C-2

Linda Aponte is an American former slalom canoeist who competed in the late 1970s. She won a silver medal in the mixed C-2 event at the 1977 ICF Canoe Slalom World Championships in Spittal.
