= Jürgen Kalbitz =

East German canoeist

Medal record

Men's canoe slalom

Representing East Germany

World Championships
Gold medal – first place	1977 Spittal	C-2

Jürgen Kalbitz is a former East German slalom canoeist who competed in the 1970s. He won a gold medal in the C-2 event at the 1977 ICF Canoe Slalom World Championships in Spittal.
