= Roland Wyss =

Swiss canoeist

Medal record

Men's canoe slalom

Representing Switzerland

World Championships
Silver medal – second place	1977 Spittal	C-2 team
Bronze medal – third place	1979 Jonquière	C-2 team

Roland Wyss is a former Swiss slalom canoeist who competed in the 1970s. He won two medals in the C-2 team event at the ICF Canoe Slalom World Championships with a silver in 1977 and a bronze in 1979.
