= Ron Lugbill =

American canoeist

Medal record

Men's canoe slalom

Representing United States

World Championships
| Gold medal – first place | 1981 Bala | C-1 team |

Ron Lugbill is a former American slalom canoeist who competed from the mid-1970s to the early 1980s.

== Career ==
He won a gold medal in the C-1 team event at the 1981 ICF Canoe Slalom World Championships in Bala, Wales, UK.

== Personal life ==
Ron is the older brother of one of the sport's all-time greats Jon Lugbill.
