= Dagmar Stupp =

German canoeist

Personal information
- Nationality: German
- Born: West Germany

Sport
- Sport: Canoeing
- Event: Wildwater canoeing

Dagmar Stupp (married Volke, born ?) is a German former canoeist who won at senior level the Wildwater Canoeing World Championships.
