= 1977 ICF Canoe Slalom World Championships =

Canoe slalom event in Spittal, Austria

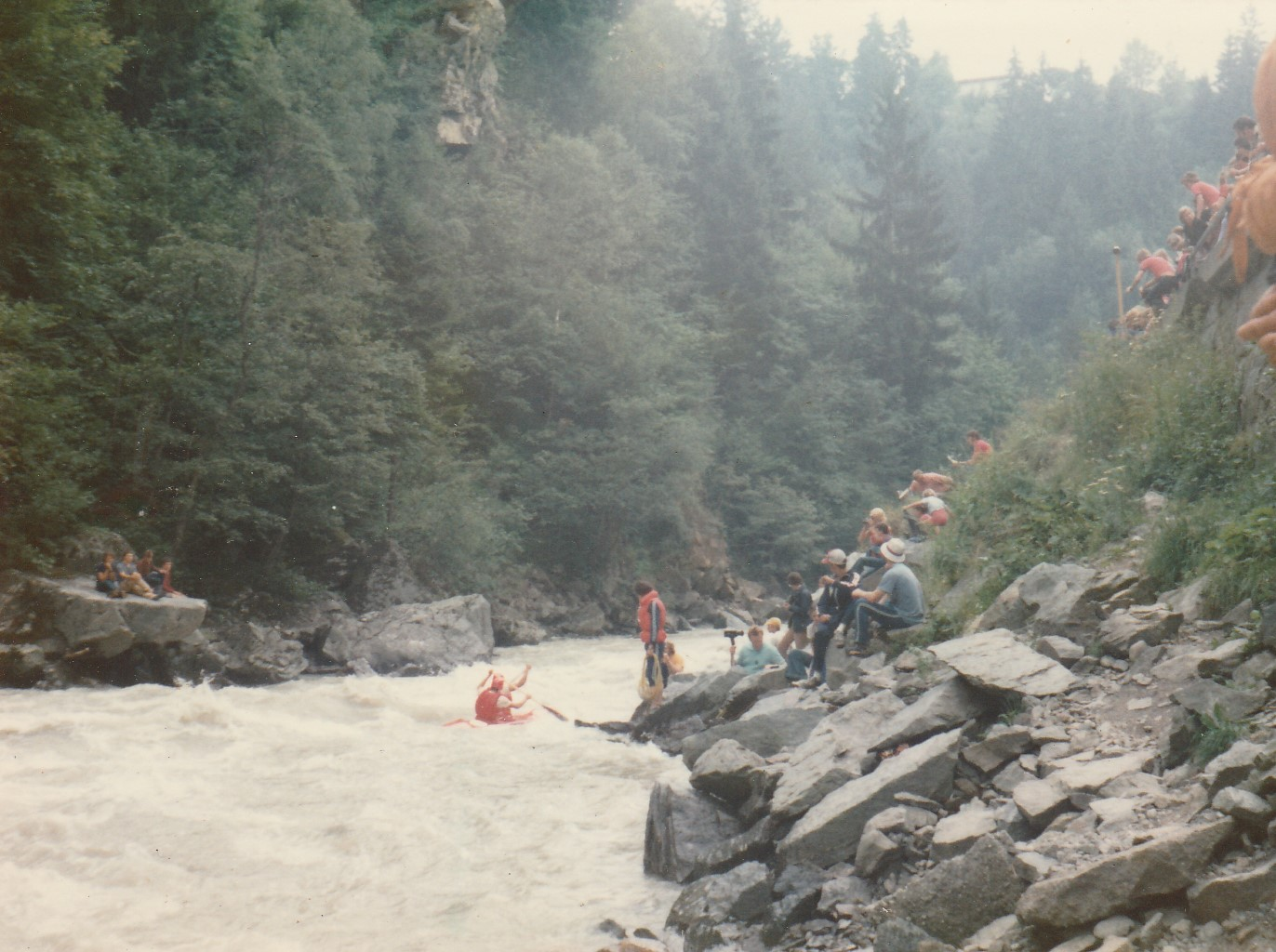
Competitors during the event

The 1977 ICF Canoe Slalom World Championships were held in Spittal, Austria under the auspices of International Canoe Federation for the record setting third time. It was the 15th edition. Spittal hosted the championships previously in 1963 and 1965. A record ten countries won medals at these championships, including the first for Australia.

== Medal summary ==
=== Men's ===
==== Canoe ====
Event	Gold	Points	Silver	Points	Bronze	Points
C1	Petr Sodomka (TCH)		Peter Massalski (GDR)		Karel Třešňák (TCH)	
C1 team	East Germany; Reinhard Eiben; Peter Massalski; Lutz Körner		West Germany; Dietmar Moos; Ernst Libuda; Walter Horn		Czechoslovakia; Jaroslav Radil; Karel Třešňák; Petr Sodomka	
C2	East Germany; Walter Hofmann; Jürgen Kalbitz		Czechoslovakia; Miroslav Nedvěd; Pavel Schwarc		East Germany; Michael Berek; Frank Kretschmer	
C2 team	Czechoslovakia; Jiří Benhák & Ladislav Benhák; Radomír Halfar & Svetomír Kmošťák; Miroslav Nedvěd & Pavel Schwarc		Switzerland; Martin Wyss & Roland Wyss; Matthias Hirsch & Manfred Walter; Jiří Krejza & Jan Karel		Poland; Jan Frączek & Ryszard Seruga; Wojciech Kudlik & Jerzy Jeż; Zbigniew Leśniak & Maciej Rychta	

==== Kayak ====
Event	Gold	Points	Silver	Points	Bronze	Points
K1	Albert Kerr (GBR)		Dieter Förstl (FRG)		Norbert Sattler (AUT)	
K1 team	France; Jean-Yves Prigent; Bernard Renault; Christian Frossard		Austria; Eduard Wolffhardt; Norbert Sattler; Peter Fauster		Poland; Wojciech Gawroński; Jerzy Stanuch; Kazimierz Gawlikowski	

=== Mixed ===
==== Canoe ====
Event	Gold	Points	Silver	Points	Bronze	Points
C2	United States; Marietta Gillman; Chuck Lyda		United States; Linda Aponte; John Kennedy		Australia; Kym Purdy; Stuart Dry	

=== Women's ===
==== Kayak ====
Event	Gold	Points	Silver	Points	Bronze	Points
K1	Angelika Bahmann (GDR)		Petra Krol (GDR)		Linda Harrison (USA)	
K1 team	Switzerland; Elisabeth Käser; Kathrin Weiss; Claire Costa		East Germany; Angelika Bahmann; Birgit Feydt; Petra Krol		United States; Cathy Hearn; Jean Campbell; Linda Harrison	

== Medals table ==
Rank	Nation	Gold	Silver	Bronze	Total
1	East Germany (GDR)	3	3	1	7
2	Czechoslovakia (TCH)	2	1	2	5
3	United States (USA)	1	1	2	4
4	Switzerland (SUI)	1	1	0	2
5	France (FRA)	1	0	0	1
5	Great Britain (GBR)	1	0	0	1
7	West Germany (FRG)	0	2	0	2
8	Austria (AUT)	0	1	1	2
9	Poland (POL)	0	0	2	2
10	Australia (AUS)	0	0	1	1
Totals (10 entries)		9	9	9	27
