= Jean Campbell (canoeist) =

American slalom canoeist

Medal record

Women's canoe slalom

Representing United States

World Championships
Bronze medal – third place	1977 Spittal	K-1 team

Jean Campbell is a former American slalom canoeist who competed in the 1970s. She won a bronze medal in the K-1 team event at the 1977 ICF Canoe Slalom World Championships in Spittal.
