= Christian Frossard =

French canoeist

Medal record

Men's slalom canoeing

Representing France

World Championships
Gold medal – first place	1977 Spittal	K-1 team

Christian Frossard is a French former slalom canoeist who competed in the 1970s.

He won a gold medal in the K-1 team event at the 1977 ICF Canoe Slalom World Championships in Spittal.
