= Chuck Lyda =

Medal record

Men's canoe slalom

Representing United States

World Championships
Gold medal – first place	1975 Skopje	Mixed C-2
Gold medal – first place	1977 Spittal	Mixed C-2

Charles Clinton Lyda (July 23, 1952 – June 12, 2010) was an American slalom and sprint canoeist who competed in the mid-to-late 1970s. He won two gold medals in the mixed C-2 event at the ICF Canoe Slalom World Championships, earning them in 1975 and 1977.

Lyda competed as a sprint canoeist in the C-2 1000 m event at the 1976 Summer Olympics in Montreal, but was eliminated in the repechage rounds. He also qualified for the 1980 Summer Olympics but was unable to compete because the United States boycotted that event.

He was born in San Diego. He died on June 12, 2010, in Folsom, California, from complications of gastric cancer.
