= Cathy Hearn =

American slalom kayaker (born 1958)

Personal information
- Full name: Catherine Ann Hearn-Röthenmund
- Born: June 1, 1958 (age 68) Bethesda, Maryland, U.S.
- Relative: David Hearn (brother)
Medal record
Women's canoe slalom
Representing United States
World Championships
Gold medal – first place	1979 Jonquière	K1
Gold medal – first place	1979 Jonquière	K1 team
Silver medal – second place	1981 Bala	K1
Silver medal – second place	1989 Savage River	K1 team
Silver medal – second place	1993 Mezzana	K1 team
Bronze medal – third place	1977 Spittal	K1 team
Bronze medal – third place	1981 Bala	K1 team
Bronze medal – third place	1987 Bourg St.-Maurice	K1 team
Bronze medal – third place	1989 Savage River	K1
Bronze medal – third place	1997 Três Coroas	K1

Catherine Ann "Cathy" Hearn-Röthenmund (born June 1, 1958) is an American slalom kayaker who competed from the late 1970s to the early 2000s.

== Career ==
She won ten medals at the ICF Canoe Slalom World Championships with two golds (K1: 1979, K1 team: 1979), three silvers (K1: 1981, K1 team: 1989, 1993), and five bronzes (K1: 1989, 1997, K1 team: 1977, 1981, 1987).

Hearn also competed in two Summer Olympics, earning her best finish of seventh in the K1 event in Atlanta in 1996.

Hearn later served as a kayaking coach from 2003, where she was technical director and Olympic coach for the Italian national team. From 2005 to 2010 she served as a coach for the United States Canoe Slalom National Team.

== Personal Life ==
According to Hearn's father, her decision to begin pursuing a career in canoe slalom came after hearing the news of Jamie McEwan's medal in whitewater slalom at the 1972 Summer Olympics.

Hearn graduated from Hampshire College with a degree in exercise physiology.

Her brother, David Hearn, and her ex-husband, Lecky Haller, also competed for the United States in canoe slalom. Her brother-in-law is former Swiss kayaker Mathias Röthenmund.

== World Cup individual podiums ==
Season	Date	Venue	Position	Event
1991	25 Aug 1991	Minden	3rd	K1
1993	18 Jul 1993	La Seu d'Urgell	2nd	K1
1997	29 Jun 1997	Björbo	2nd	K1
1997	3 Aug 1997	Minden	3rd	K1
1998	2 Aug 1998	Wausau	1st	K1
