= Rosine Roland =

Belgian retired slalom canoeist (born 1948)

Rosine Roland (born 6 October 1948 in Grâce-Berleur, Liège) is a Belgian retired slalom canoeist who competed in the 1970s and the 1980s. She finished 17th in the K-1 event at the 1972 Summer Olympics in Munich.
