= Claire Costa =

Swiss slalom canoeist

Medal record

Women's canoe slalom

Representing Switzerland

World Championships
Gold medal – first place	1977 Spittal	K-1 team

Claire Costa is a former Swiss slalom canoeist who competed from the late 1970s to the early 1980s.

She won a gold medal in the K-1 team event at the 1977 ICF Canoe Slalom World Championships in Spittal.
