= Josef Schumacher =

Medal record

Men's canoe slalom

Representing West Germany

World Championships
Bronze medal – third place	1973 Muotathal	C-1 team

Josef Schumacher is a former West German slalom canoeist who competed in the 1970s. He won a bronze medal in the C-1 team event at the 1973 ICF Canoe Slalom World Championships in Muotathal.
