= Kathrin Weiss =

Swiss slalom canoeist

Medal record

Women's canoe slalom

Representing Switzerland

World Championships
Gold medal – first place	1977 Spittal	K-1 team
Bronze medal – third place	1979 Jonquière	K-1 team

Kathrin Weiss is a former Swiss slalom canoeist who competed from the mid–1970s to the early 1980s.

She won two medals in the K–1 team event at the ICF Canoe Slalom World Championships with a gold in 1977 and a bronze in 1979.
