= Hans Schlecht =

Austrian canoeist (born 1948)

Medal record

Men's slalom canoeing

Representing Austria

World Championships
Gold medal – first place	1971 Meran	K-1 team

Hans Schlecht (born 23 January 1948) is an Austrian retired slalom canoeist who competed in the early-to-mid 1970s. He won a gold medal in the K-1 team event at the 1971 ICF Canoe Slalom World Championships in Meran.

Schlecht also finished 15th in the K-1 event at the 1972 Summer Olympics in Munich.
