= Jonquière =

Borough of Saguenay, Quebec, Canada

Coordinates: 48°25′N 71°15′W

- Borough
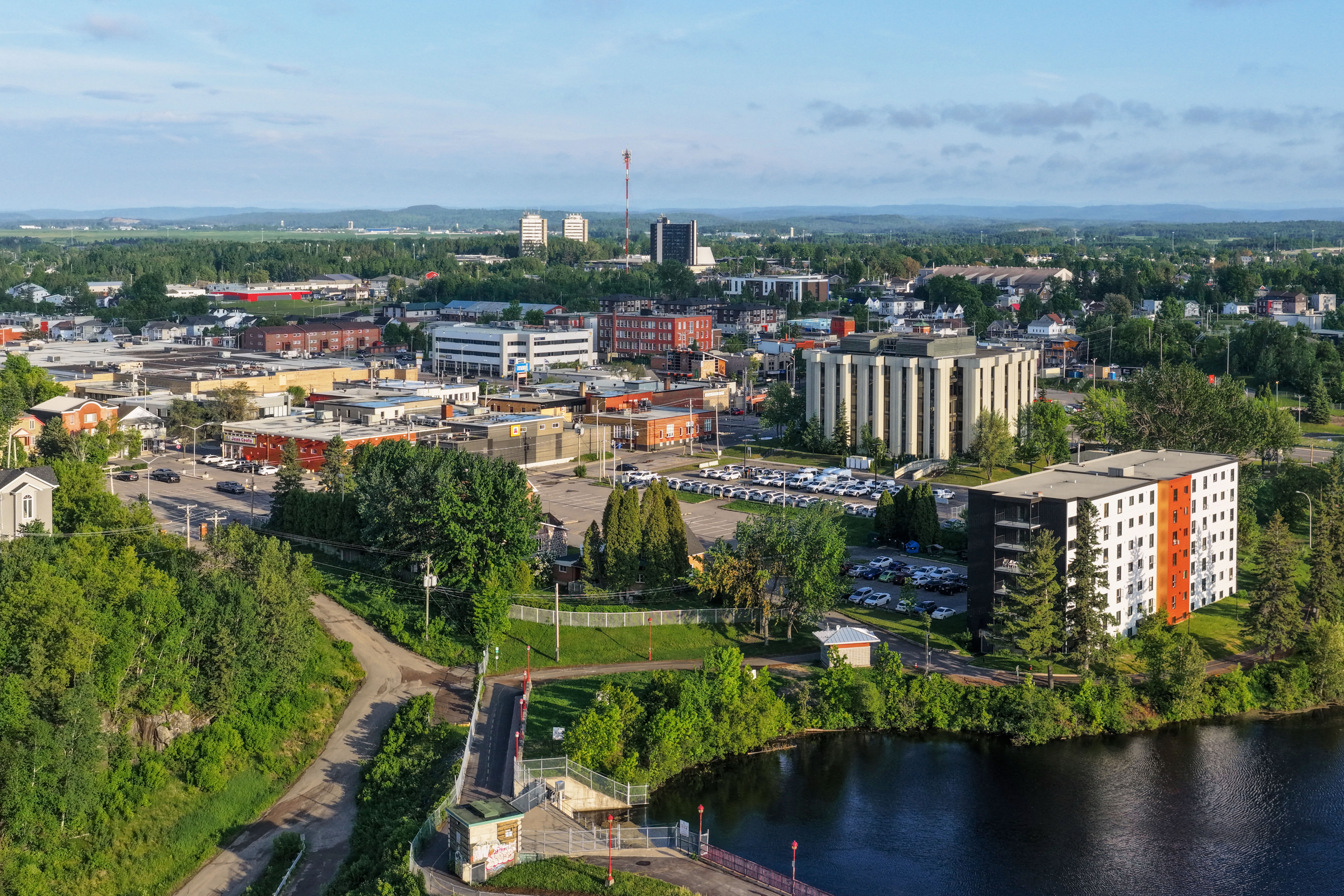
- Downtown Jonquière (2026)

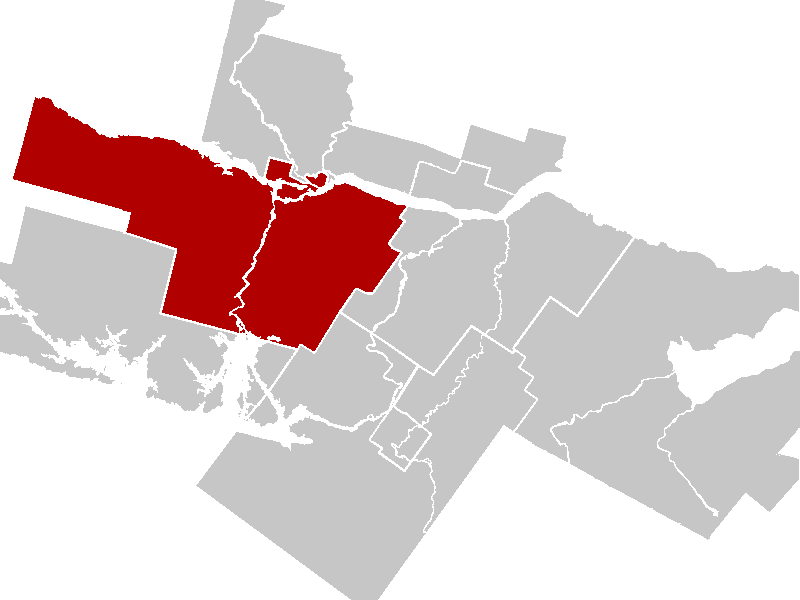
- Jonquière in red
- Country: Canada
- Province: Quebec
- Region: Saguenay–Lac-Saint-Jean
- City: Saguenay

Government
  - Borough president: Carl Dufour
- Website: Borough Council of Jonquière

Jonquière (/ʒɒŋˈkjɛər/; French pronunciation: [ʒɔ̃kjɛʁ]; 2021 population: 60,250) is a borough (arrondissement) of the city of Saguenay in the Saguenay–Lac-Saint-Jean region of Quebec, Canada. It is located on the Saguenay River, near the borough of Chicoutimi.

== History ==
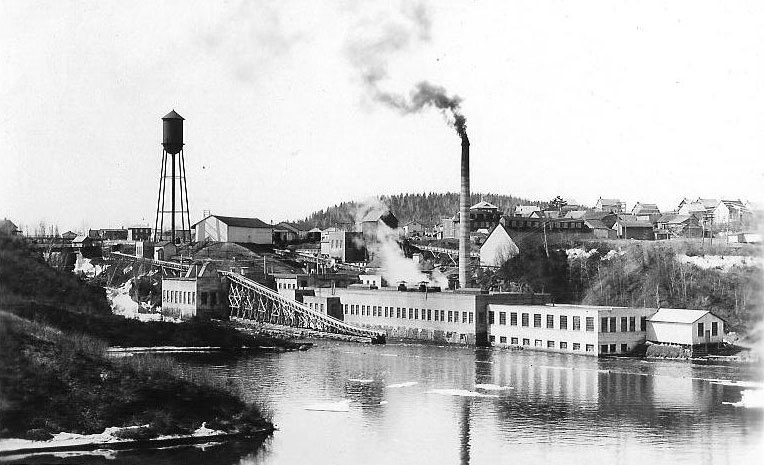
Pulp and paper mills in Jonquière, c. 1899–1901

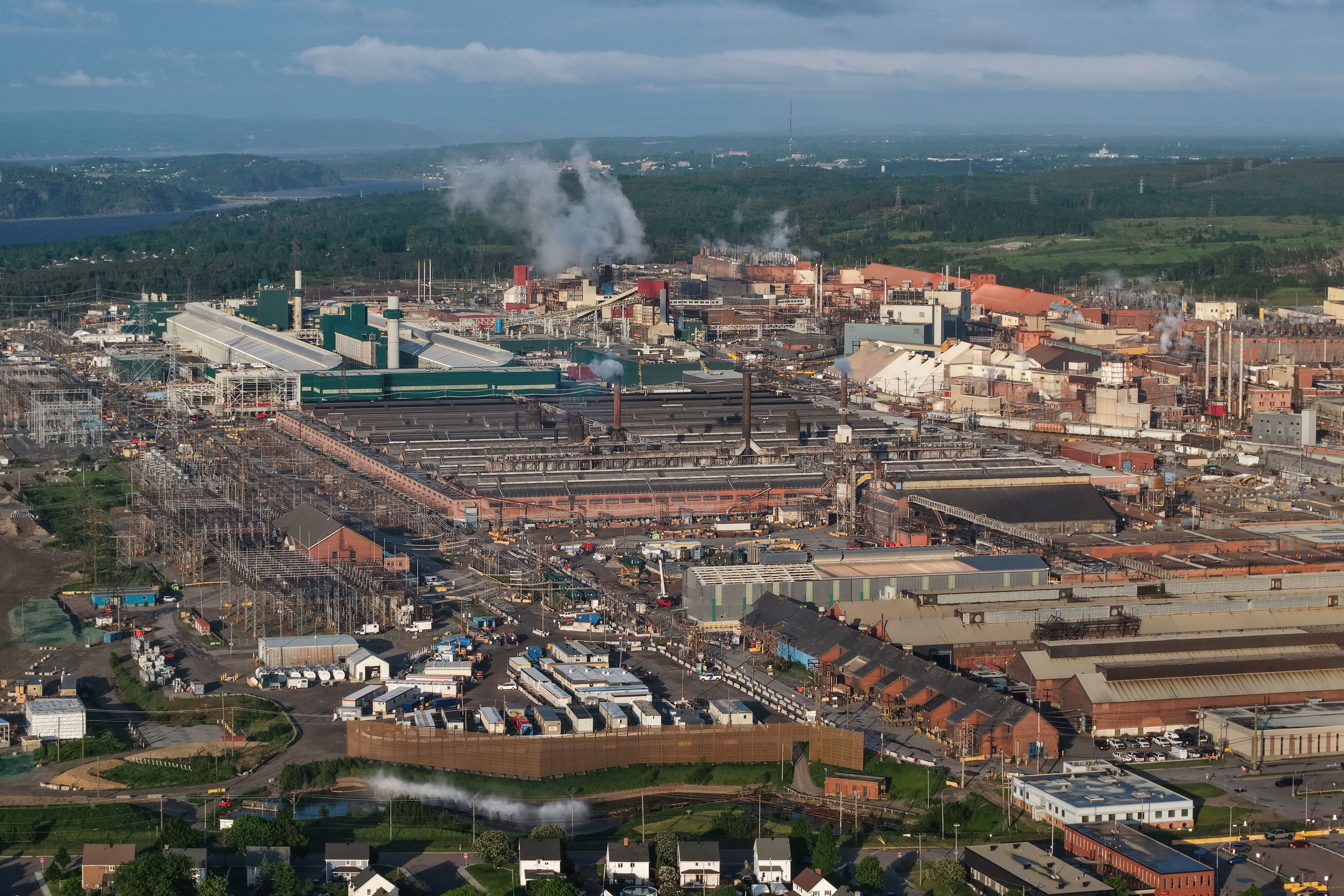
Aerial view of Rio Tinto Alcan's aluminum complex in Jonquière

Jonquière was founded in 1847 by Marguerite Belley, who came from La Malbaie to settle on the Rivière aux Sables. It was named after Jacques-Pierre de Taffanel de la Jonquière, Marquis de la Jonquière, governor of New France from 1749 to 1752.

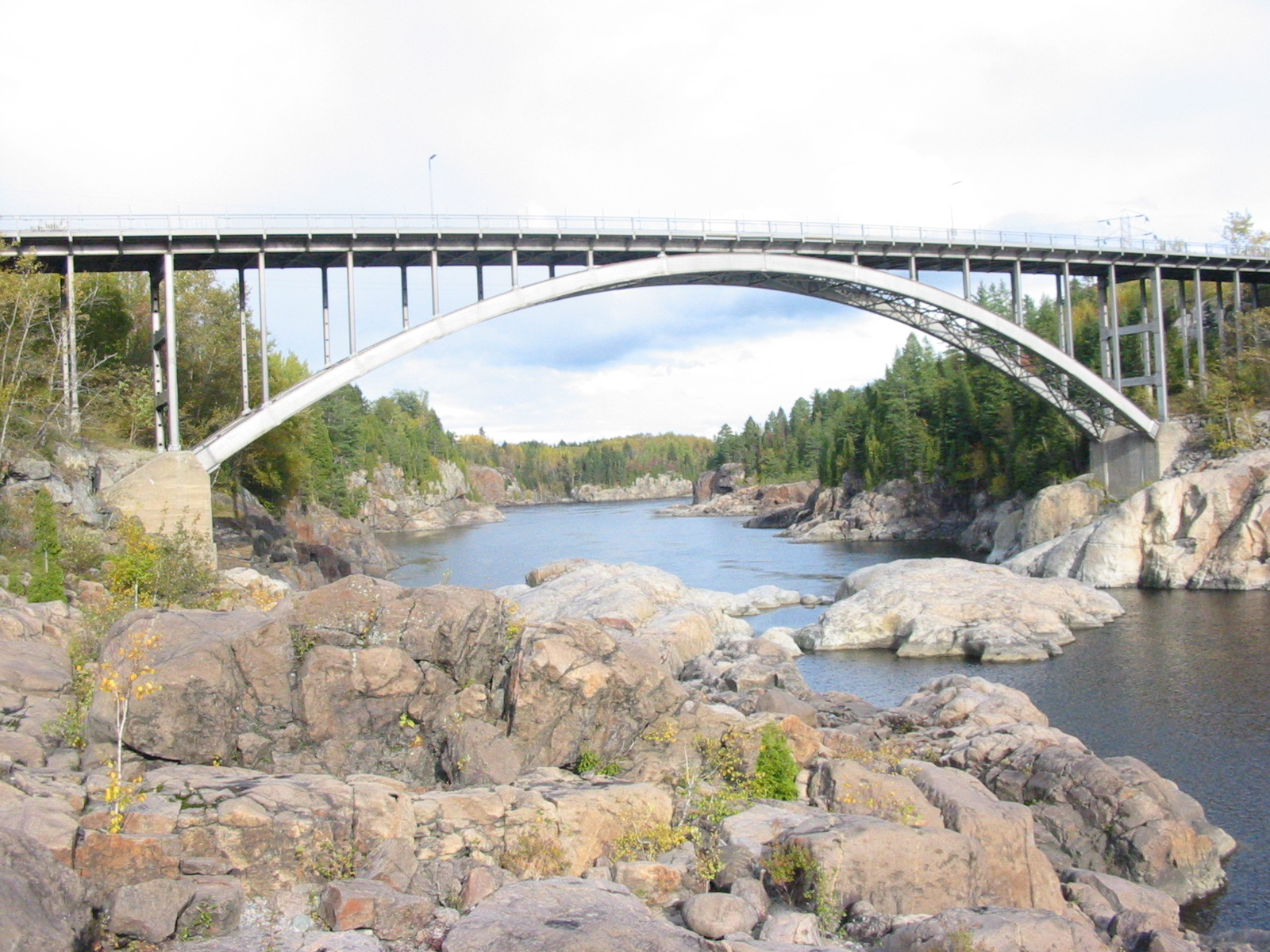
Arvida Bridge in Jonquière

Growth came from the construction of pulp and paper mills at the beginning of the 20th century. Between 1925 and 1928, the world's largest aluminum plant was built along with the city Arvida (then a separate town). In 1942, to supply power to the plant, Alcan built a hydroelectric station at Shipshaw that was the largest in the world at that time. Jonquière, Arvida and Kénogami were amalgamated into the single city of Jonquière in 1975. Jonquière was the host city for the Quebec Games in the winter of 1976 and for the Canoe/Kayak World Championships in slalom and whitewater racing in 1979.

Much of Jonquière's development owed its strength to the Price family, who ran a pulp and paper factory in Kénogami. Today that factory is owned by Resolute Forest Products. Arvida is the home of an aluminium plant owned by Rio Tinto Alcan.

When the city of Saguenay was constituted on February 18, 2002 by municipal amalgamation, the borough of Jonquière was created from a consolidation of the city of Jonquière and the former municipalities of Shipshaw and Lac-Kénogami. The former city of Jonquière had a population of 54,842 in the Canada 2001 Census, the last census in which Jonquière was counted as a separate city.

The heavy metal band Voivod formed in Jonquière.

The Rivière aux Sables runs through the centre of Jonquière. Significant damage to the city's buildings was caused by the 1996 Saguenay Flood.

== Transportation ==
=== Rail ===
Jonquière is the northern terminus of the Montreal–Jonquière passenger train operated by Via Rail. Three round-trip trains per week run between Jonquière station and Montreal Central Station, scheduled to take about nine hours each way. This route is shared by the Montreal–Senneterre train as far as Hervey station. From Montreal, passengers can connect to trains serving major destinations such as Quebec City, Ottawa, Toronto, Halifax, and New York City.

== Notable people ==
- Christiane Chabot, artist
- Bernard Jean, oboist, conductor, and music educator
- Pierre Pilote, NHL hall of famer
- Rafaël Harvey-Pinard, NHL player
- Annie Villeneuve, singer-songwriter
- Voivod, heavy metal band
- Guillaume Morissette, novelist

=== Mayors ===
- Jean Allard ( – January 20, 1868), (1872–1876) and (February 5, 1894 – August 26, 1895 Death)
- Jules Gauthier Me Jules Gauthier (1942 - bef 1949)
- Camille Gagné
- Francis Dufour (1975–1985) (Arvida 1967 – 1975)
- Gilles Marceau
- Marcel Martel ( – November 7, 1999)
- Daniel Giguère (November 7, 1999 – February 18, 2002)
