= Canoeing at the 1992 Summer Olympics =

Canoeing at the Games of the XXV Olympiad
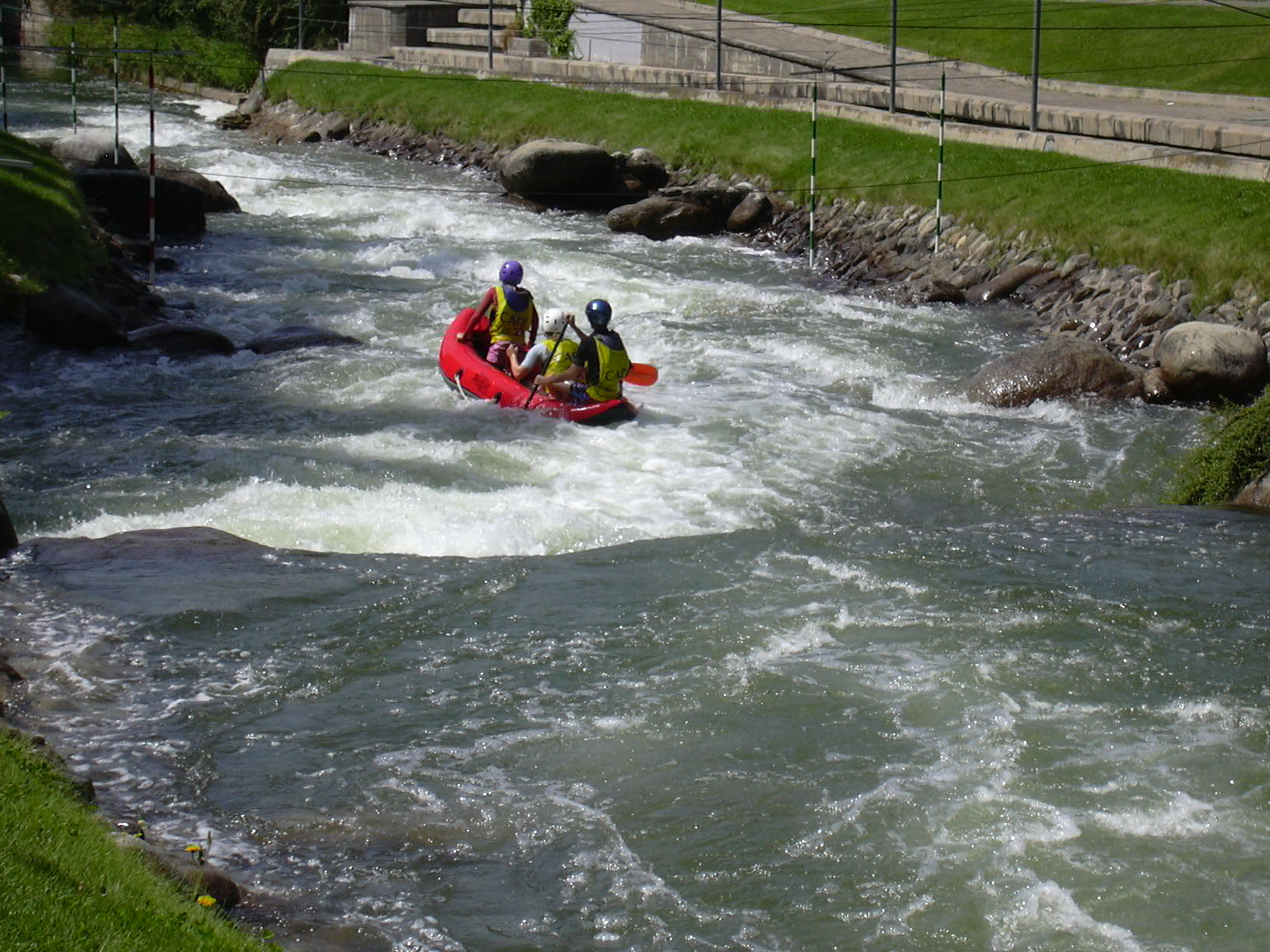
- Venue: Segre Olympic Park (slalom); Canal Olímpic de Catalunya (sprint)
- Dates: 1−8 August 1992
- No. of events: 16
- Competitors: 440 from 46 nations

The canoeing competition at the 1992 Summer Olympics in Barcelona was composed of 16 events (12 for men and 4 for women) in two disciplines, slalom and sprint. The slalom events returned to the Olympic program after a 20-year absence, since the 1972 Munich Games. Slalom events took place at La Seu d'Urgell while the sprint events took place at Castelldefels.

== Medal table ==
Rank	Nation	Gold	Silver	Bronze	Total
1	Germany	7	2	2	11
2	Bulgaria	2	0	1	3
3	Hungary	1	3	2	6
4	Australia	1	1	1	3
5	Czechoslovakia	1	1	0	2
5	Unified Team	1	1	0	2
7	United States	1	0	2	3
8	Italy	1	0	1	2
9	Finland	1	0	0	1
10	Sweden	0	2	1	3
11	France	0	1	3	4
12	Poland	0	1	2	3
13	Norway	0	1	1	2
14	Denmark	0	1	0	1
14	Great Britain	0	1	0	1
14	Latvia	0	1	0	1
Totals (16 entries)		16	16	16	48

== Medal summary ==
=== Slalom ===
Games	Gold	Silver	Bronze
Men's C-1	Lukáš Pollert; Czechoslovakia	Gareth Marriott; Great Britain	Jacky Avril; France
Men's C-2	Joe Jacobi and Scott Strausbaugh; United States	Jiří Rohan and Miroslav Šimek; Czechoslovakia	Frank Adisson and Wilfrid Forgues; France
Men's K-1	Pierpaolo Ferrazzi; Italy	Sylvain Curinier; France	Jochen Lettmann; Germany
Women's K-1	Elisabeth Micheler-Jones; Germany	Danielle Woodward; Australia	Dana Chladek; United States

=== Sprint ===
==== Men's events ====
Games	Gold	Silver	Bronze
C-1 500 metres	Nikolay Bukhalov; Bulgaria	Michał Śliwiński; Unified Team (Ukraine)	Olaf Heukrodt; Germany
C-1 1000 metres	Nikolay Bukhalov; Bulgaria	Ivans Klementjevs; Latvia	György Zala; Hungary
C-2 500 metres	Unified Team; Dmitri Dovgalenok; Aleksandr Maseikov (Belarus)	Germany; Ulrich Papke; Ingo Spelly	Bulgaria; Martin Marinov; Blagovest Stoyanov
C-2 1000 metres	Germany; Ulrich Papke; Ingo Spelly	Denmark; Arne Nielsson; Christian Frederiksen	France; Didier Hoyer; Olivier Boivin
K-1 500 metres	Mikko Kolehmainen; Finland	Zsolt Gyulay; Hungary	Knut Holmann; Norway
K-1 1000 metres	Clint Robinson; Australia	Knut Holmann; Norway	Greg Barton; United States
K-2 500 metres	Germany; Kay Bluhm; Torsten Gutsche	Poland; Maciej Freimut; Wojciech Kurpiewski	Italy; Bruno Dreossi; Antonio Rossi
K-2 1000 metres	Germany; Kay Bluhm; Torsten Gutsche	Sweden; Gunnar Olsson; Kalle Sundqvist	Poland; Grzegorz Kotowicz; Dariusz Białkowski
K-4 1000 metres	Germany; Mario von Appen; Oliver Kegel; Thomas Reineck; André Wohllebe	Hungary; Ferenc Csipes; Zsolt Gyulay; Attila Ábrahám; László Fidel	Australia; Ramon Andersson; Kelvin Graham; Ian Rowling; Steven Wood

==== Women's events ====
Games	Gold	Silver	Bronze
K-1 500 metres	Birgit Schmidt; Germany	Rita Kőbán; Hungary	Izabela Dylewska; Poland
K-2 500 metres	Ramona Portwich and Anke von Seck (GER)	Susanne Gunnarsson and Agneta Andersson (SWE)	Rita Kőbán and Éva Dónusz (HUN)
K-4 500 metres	Hungary; Rita Kőbán; Éva Dónusz; Erika Mészáros; Kinga Czigány	Germany; Katrin Borchert; Ramona Portwich; Birgit Schmidt; Anke von Seck	Sweden; Anna Olsson; Agneta Andersson; Maria Haglund; Susanne Rosenqvist

== Participating nations ==
- Argentina (5)
- Australia (17)
- Austria (4)
- Belgium (2)
- Bosnia and Herzegovina (1)
- Brazil (6)
- Bulgaria (11)
- Canada (18)
- China (4)
- Costa Rica (4)
- Croatia (4)
- Cuba (5)
- Czechoslovakia (27)
- Denmark (6)
- Estonia (1)
- Finland (2)
- France (31)
- Germany (29)
- Great Britain (25)
- Hong Kong (2)
- Hungary (14)
- Independent Olympic Participants (5)
- Indonesia (3)
- Ireland (5)
- Italy (18)
- Ivory Coast (2)
- Japan (6)
- Latvia (3)
- Lithuania (1)
- Mexico (4)
- Netherlands (4)
- New Zealand (8)
- Norway (7)
- Peru (1)
- Poland (18)
- Portugal (7)
- Romania (14)
- Slovenia (6)
- South Africa (11)
- South Korea (6)
- Spain (21)
- Sweden (13)
- Switzerland (6)
- Unified Team (19)
- United States (32)
- Uruguay (1)
