= 1993 Canoe Slalom World Cup =

The 1993 Canoe Slalom World Cup was a series of five races in 4 canoeing and kayaking categories organized by the International Canoe Federation (ICF). It was the 6th edition. The series consisted of 4 regular world cup races and the world cup final.

== Calendar ==
Label	Venue	Date
World Cup Race 1	(Spain) La Seu d'Urgell	17-18 July
World Cup Race 2	(Austria) Lofer	23-25 July
World Cup Race 3	(Germany) Augsburg	31 July – 1 August
World Cup Race 4	(Canada) Minden	20-21 August
World Cup Final	(United States) Ocoee	30-31 August

== Final standings ==
The winner of each world cup race was awarded 25 points. The points scale reached down to 1 point for 15th place. Only the best two results of each athlete from the first 4 world cups plus the result from the world cup final counted for the final world cup standings. Furthermore, an athlete or boat had to compete in the world cup final and two other world cup races in order to be classified in the world cup rankings. If two or more athletes or boats were equal on points, the ranking was determined by their positions in the world cup final.

=== C1 men ===
Pos	Athlete	Points
1	Lukáš Pollert (CZE)	65
2	David Hearn (USA)	58
3	Sören Kaufmann (GER)	47
4	Mike Corcoran (IRL)	42
5	Emmanuel Brugvin (FRA)	40
6	Martin Lang (GER)	39
7	Gareth Marriott (GBR)	36
8	Danko Herceg (CRO)	35
9	Carlo Faloci (FRA)	34
10	Jed Prentice (USA)	24

=== C2 men ===
Pos	Athletes	Points
1	Miroslav Šimek/Jiří Rohan (CZE)	75
2	Jérôme Daille/Gilles Lelievre (FRA)	47
3	Frank Adisson/Wilfrid Forgues (FRA)	44
4	Éric Biau/Bertrand Daille (FRA)	41
5	Manfred Berro/Michael Trummer (GER)	34
6	Fritz Haller/Lecky Haller (USA)	32
7	François Letourneau/Benoît Gauthier (CAN)	17

=== K1 men ===
Pos	Athlete	Points
1	Scott Shipley (USA)	60
2	Thomas Becker (GER)	40
3	Sylvain Curinier (FRA)	40
4	Melvyn Jones (GBR)	40
5	Pierpaolo Ferrazzi (ITA)	36
6	Albin Čižman (SLO)	36
7	Manuel Köhler (AUT)	35
8	Ian Wiley (IRL)	35
9	Shaun Pearce (GBR)	34
10	Ian Raspin (GBR)	29

=== K1 women ===
Pos	Athlete	Points
1	Kordula Striepecke (GER)	65
2	Myriam Jerusalmi (FRA)	65
3	Lynn Simpson (GBR)	61
4	Cathy Hearn (USA)	44
5	Elisabeth Micheler (GER)	38
6	Štěpánka Hilgertová (CZE)	33
7	Sheryl Boyle (CAN)	26
8	Zdenka Grossmannová (CZE)	26
9	Marianne Agulhon (FRA)	26
10	Jana Freeburn (USA)	23

== Results ==
=== World Cup Race 1 ===
The first world cup race of the season took place at the Segre Olympic Park in La Seu d'Urgell from 17 to 18 July.

Event	Gold	Score	Silver	Score	Bronze	Score
C1 men	Patrice Estanguet (FRA)	110.18	Mike Corcoran (IRL)	112.61	Pere Guerrero (ESP)	112.69
C2 men	France; Jérôme Daille; Gilles Lelievre	116.82	Czech Republic; Marek Jiras; Tomáš Máder	118.54	France; Frank Adisson; Wilfrid Forgues	118.96
K1 men	Ian Wiley (IRL)	103.90	Scott Shipley (USA)	104.53	Thomas Becker (GER)	104.61
K1 women	Lynn Simpson (GBR)	121.26	Cathy Hearn (USA)	121.69	Sheryl Boyle (CAN)	124.26

=== World Cup Race 2 ===
The second world cup race of the season took place in Lofer, Austria from 23 to 25 July.

Event	Gold	Score	Silver	Score	Bronze	Score
C1 men	Lukáš Pollert (CZE)	139.56	Martin Lang (GER)	141.35	Sören Kaufmann (GER)	141.55
C2 men	Czech Republic; Miroslav Šimek; Jiří Rohan	147.90	Poland; Krzysztof Kołomański; Michał Staniszewski	149.66	France; Frank Adisson; Wilfrid Forgues	151.80
K1 men	Sylvain Curinier (FRA)	129.61	Ian Raspin (GBR)	131.51	Shaun Pearce (GBR)	131.69
K1 women	Lynn Simpson (GBR)	147.26	Myriam Jerusalmi (FRA)	149.24	Štěpánka Hilgertová (CZE)	150.43

=== World Cup Race 3 ===
The third world cup race of the season took place at the Augsburg Eiskanal from 31 July to 1 August.

Event	Gold	Score	Silver	Score	Bronze	Score
C1 men	David Hearn (USA)	149.30	Sören Kaufmann (GER)	153.03	Emmanuel Brugvin (FRA)	154.15
C2 men	France; Thierry Saidi; Emmanuel del Rey	157.71	Czech Republic; Miroslav Šimek; Jiří Rohan	157.72	Poland; Michał Staniszewski; Krzysztof Kołomański	158.00
K1 men	Luboš Hilgert (CZE)	138.31	Manuel Köhler (AUT)	138.49	Oliver Fix (GER)	143.02
K1 women	Myriam Jerusalmi (FRA)	155.63	Kordula Striepecke (GER)	161.18	Elisabeth Micheler (GER)	164.66

=== World Cup Race 4 ===
The fourth world cup race of the season took place at the Minden Wild Water Preserve in Ontario from 20 to 21 August.

Event	Gold	Score	Silver	Score	Bronze	Score
C1 men	Lukáš Pollert (CZE)		Emmanuel Brugvin (FRA)		Carlo Faloci (FRA)	
C2 men	Czech Republic; Miroslav Šimek; Jiří Rohan		France; Frank Adisson; Wilfrid Forgues		United States; Elliot Weintrob; Martin McCormick	
K1 men	Melvyn Jones (GBR)				Scott Shipley (USA)	
K1 women	Lynn Simpson (GBR)		Kordula Striepecke (GER)		Marianne Agulhon (FRA)	

=== World Cup Final ===
The final world cup race of the season took place at the Ocoee Whitewater Center from 30 to 31 August.

Event	Gold	Score	Silver	Score	Bronze	Score
C1 men	David Hearn (USA)	134.67	Gareth Marriott (GBR)	139.52	Lukáš Pollert (CZE)	140.21
C2 men	Czech Republic; Miroslav Šimek; Jiří Rohan	143.27	France; Éric Biau; Bertrand Daille	144.79	United States; Fritz Haller; Lecky Haller	147.93
K1 men	Scott Shipley (USA)	122.76	Pierpaolo Ferrazzi (ITA)	126.27	Thomas Becker (GER)	126.34
K1 women	Kordula Striepecke (GER)	145.04	Myriam Jerusalmi (FRA)	146.97	Elisabeth Micheler (GER)	150.68
