= Canoeing at the 1992 Summer Olympics – Men's slalom C-2 =

These are the results of the men's C-2 slalom competition in canoeing at the 1992 Summer Olympics. The C-2 (canoe single) event is raced by two-man canoes through a whitewater course. The venue for the 1992 Olympic competition was in La Seu d'Urgell.

== Medalists ==
Gold	Silver	Bronze
Joe Jacobi and Scott Strausbaugh (USA)	Jiří Rohan and Miroslav Šimek (TCH)	Frank Adisson and Wilfrid Forgues (FRA)

== Results ==
The 17 teams each took two runs through the whitewater slalom course on August 2. The best time of the two runs counted for the event.

Rank	Name	Run 1			Run 2			Result
Rank	Name	Time	Points	Total	Time	Points	Total	Total
Gold	Scott Strausbaugh & Joe Jacobi (USA)	2:04.82	0	124.82	2:02.41	0	122.41	122.41
Silver	Miroslav Šimek & Jiří Rohan (TCH)	2:06.91	5	131.91	1:59.25	5	124.25	124.25
Bronze	Frank Adisson & Wilfrid Forgues (FRA)	2:04.09	20	144.09	2:04.38	0	124.38	124.38
4	Jamie McEwan & Lecky Haller (USA)	2:11.35	5	136.35	2:08.05	0	128.05	128.05
5	Ueli Matti & Peter Matti (SUI)	2:13.71	20	153.71	2:03.55	5	128.55	128.55
6	Pavel Štercl & Petr Štercl (TCH)	2:10.42	0	130.42	2:11.33	5	136.33	130.42
7	Jan Petříček & Tomáš Petříček (TCH)	2:07.25	5	132.25	2:06.86	5	131.86	131.86
8	Thierry Saïdi & Emmanuel del Rey (FRA)	2:07.29	5	132.29	2:07.96	10	137.96	132.29
9	Manfred Berro & Michael Trummer (GER)	2:20.60	30	170.60	2:07.83	5	132.83	132.83
10	Krzysztof Kołomański & Michał Staniszewski (POL)	2:07.76	15	142.76	2:08.75	5	133.75	133.75
11	Éric Biau & Bertrand Daille (FRA)	2:08.83	5	133.83	2:30.64	10	160.64	133.83
12	Andrew Clough & Iain Clough (GBR)	2:10.56	10	140.56	2:10.82	5	135.82	135.82
13	Thomas Loose & Frank Hemmer (GER)	2:09.47	14	144.47	2:11.03	5	136.03	136.03
14	Udo Raumann & Rüdiger Hübbers (GER)	2:16.05	10	146.05	2:21.51	165	306.51	146.05
15	Elliot Weintrob & Martin McCormick (USA)	2:20.59	10	150.59	2:27.08	5	152.08	150.59
16	Andrew Wilson & Matthew Pallister (AUS)	2:25.71	15	150.71	2:26.57	10	156.67	150.71
17	Chris Arrowsmith & Paul Brain (GBR)	2:24.50	30	174.50	2:21.89	70	211.89	174.50
