= 1995 Canoe Slalom World Cup =

The 1995 Canoe Slalom World Cup was a series of five races in 4 canoeing and kayaking categories organized by the International Canoe Federation (ICF). It was the 8th edition. The series consisted of 4 regular world cup races and the world cup final.

== Calendar ==
Label	Venue	Date
World Cup Race 1	(Czech Republic) Prague	24–25 June
World Cup Race 2	(Slovenia) Tacen	1–2 July
World Cup Race 3	(Italy) Mezzana	8–9 July
World Cup Race 4	(Austria) Lofer	15–16 July
World Cup Final	(United States) Ocoee	29 September - 1 October

== Final standings ==
The winner of each world cup race was awarded 25 points. The points scale reached down to 1 point for 15th place. Only the best two results of each athlete from the first 4 world cups plus the result from the world cup final counted for the final world cup standings.

=== C1 men ===
Pos	Athlete	Points
1	Gareth Marriott (GBR)	62
2	Emmanuel Brugvin (FRA)	52
3	Danko Herceg (CRO)	47
4	Lukáš Pollert (CZE)	46
5	Martin Lang (GER)	40
6	Carlo Faloci (FRA)	34
7	Patrice Estanguet (FRA)	32
8	Sören Kaufmann (GER)	30
9	Michal Martikán (SVK)	26
10	Simon Hočevar (SLO)	25

=== C2 men ===
Pos	Athletes	Points
1	Miroslav Šimek/Jiří Rohan (CZE)	75
2	Fritz Haller/Lecky Haller (USA)	53
3	Petr Štercl/Pavel Štercl (CZE)	46
4	Frank Adisson/Wilfrid Forgues (FRA)	45
5	André Ehrenberg/Michael Senft (GER)	36
6	Jaroslav Pospíšil/Jaroslav Pollert (CZE)	33
7	Krzysztof Kołomański/Michał Staniszewski (POL)	31
7	Marek Jiras/Tomáš Máder (CZE)	31
9	François Letourneau/Benoît Gauthier (CAN)	30
10	Roman Štrba/Roman Vajs (SVK)	25

=== K1 men ===
Pos	Athlete	Points
1	Scott Shipley (USA)	57
2	Thomas Becker (GER)	55
2	Manuel Köhler (AUT)	55
4	Fedja Marušič (SLO)	44
5	Andraž Vehovar (SLO)	41
6	Oliver Fix (GER)	40
7	Ian Wiley (IRL)	32
8	Pierpaolo Ferrazzi (ITA)	29
9	David Ford (CAN)	24
9	Shaun Pearce (GBR)	24

=== K1 women ===
Pos	Athlete	Points
1	Lynn Simpson (GBR)	70
2	Štěpánka Hilgertová (CZE)	62
3	Anne Boixel (FRA)	46
4	Kordula Striepecke (GER)	41
5	Elisabeth Micheler-Jones (GER)	35
6	Irena Pavelková (CZE)	32
7	Elena Kaliská (SVK)	29
7	Marcela Sadilová (CZE)	29
7	Brigitte Guibal (FRA)	29
10	Myriam Fox-Jerusalmi (FRA)	25

== Results ==
=== World Cup Race 1 ===
The first world cup race of the season took place at the Prague-Troja Canoeing Centre, Czech Republic from 24 to 25 June.

Event	Gold	Score	Silver	Score	Bronze	Score
C1 men	Danko Herceg (CRO)	112.75	Martin Lang (GER)	113.98	Vitus Husek (GER)	114.22
C2 men	United States; Fritz Haller; Lecky Haller	119.47	Czech Republic; Miroslav Šimek; Jiří Rohan	120.85	Czech Republic; Petr Štercl; Pavel Štercl	122.51
K1 men	Thomas Becker (GER)	104.97	Fedja Marušič (SLO)	105.91	Andraž Vehovar (SLO)	106.72
K1 women	Štěpánka Hilgertová (CZE)	122.66	Elisabeth Micheler-Jones (GER)	122.96	Danielle Woodward (AUS)	123.89

=== World Cup Race 2 ===
The second world cup race of the season took place at the Tacen Whitewater Course, Slovenia from 1 to 2 July.

Event	Gold	Score	Silver	Score	Bronze	Score
C1 men	Lukáš Pollert (CZE)	116.15	Michal Martikán (SVK)	116.81	Mark Delaney (GBR)	120.95
C2 men	Czech Republic; Miroslav Šimek; Jiří Rohan	121.89	Czech Republic; Petr Štercl; Pavel Štercl	123.31	Slovakia; Roman Štrba; Roman Vajs	129.19
K1 men	Andraž Vehovar (SLO)	109.30	Manuel Köhler (AUT)	109.78	Fedja Marušič (SLO)	110.03
K1 women	Kordula Striepecke (GER)	129.84	Irena Pavelková (CZE)	131.08	Elisabeth Micheler-Jones (GER)	132.33

=== World Cup Race 3 ===
The third world cup race of the season took place in Mezzana, Italy from 8 to 9 July.

Event	Gold	Score	Silver	Score	Bronze	Score
C1 men	Gareth Marriott (GBR)	121.26	Lukáš Pollert (CZE)	123.13	Patrice Estanguet (FRA)	123.41
C2 men	Czech Republic; Miroslav Šimek; Jiří Rohan	124.02	France; Frank Adisson; Wilfrid Forgues	124.61	France; Éric Biau; Bertrand Daille	126.78
K1 men	Manuel Köhler (AUT)	115.45	Pierpaolo Ferrazzi (ITA)	115.82	Oliver Fix (GER)	117.48
K1 women	Lynn Simpson (GBR)	126.17	Štěpánka Hilgertová (CZE)	128.40	Anne Boixel (FRA)	129.15

=== World Cup Race 4 ===
The fourth world cup race of the season took place in Lofer, Austria from 15 to 16 July.

Event	Gold	Score	Silver	Score	Bronze	Score
C1 men	Emmanuel Brugvin (FRA)	122.05	Carlo Faloci (FRA)	122.17	Danko Herceg (CRO)	123.57
C2 men	France; Frank Adisson; Wilfrid Forgues	126.28	Czech Republic; Miroslav Šimek; Jiří Rohan	128.26	Germany; André Ehrenberg; Michael Senft	130.22
K1 men	Oliver Fix (GER)	114.44	Scott Shipley (USA)	115.06	Vincent Fondeviole (FRA)	116.03
K1 women	Štěpánka Hilgertová (CZE)	129.73	Lynn Simpson (GBR)	130.01	Brigitte Guibal (FRA)	133.18

=== World Cup Final ===
The final world cup race of the season took place at the Ocoee Whitewater Center, Tennessee from 29 September to 1 October.

Event	Gold	Score	Silver	Score	Bronze	Score
C1 men	Gareth Marriott (GBR)	175.50	Martin Lang (GER)	181.03	Emmanuel Brugvin (FRA)	181.64
C2 men	Czech Republic; Miroslav Šimek; Jiří Rohan	184.36	United States; Fritz Haller; Lecky Haller	187.12	Poland; Krzysztof Kołomański; Michał Staniszewski	188.81
K1 men	Scott Shipley (USA)	163.01	Thomas Becker (GER)	164.26	David Ford (CAN)	167.28
K1 women	Lynn Simpson (GBR)	183.07	Anne Boixel (FRA)	187.49	Myriam Fox-Jerusalmi (FRA)	187.75
