= Frank Adisson =

French slalom canoeist (born 1969)

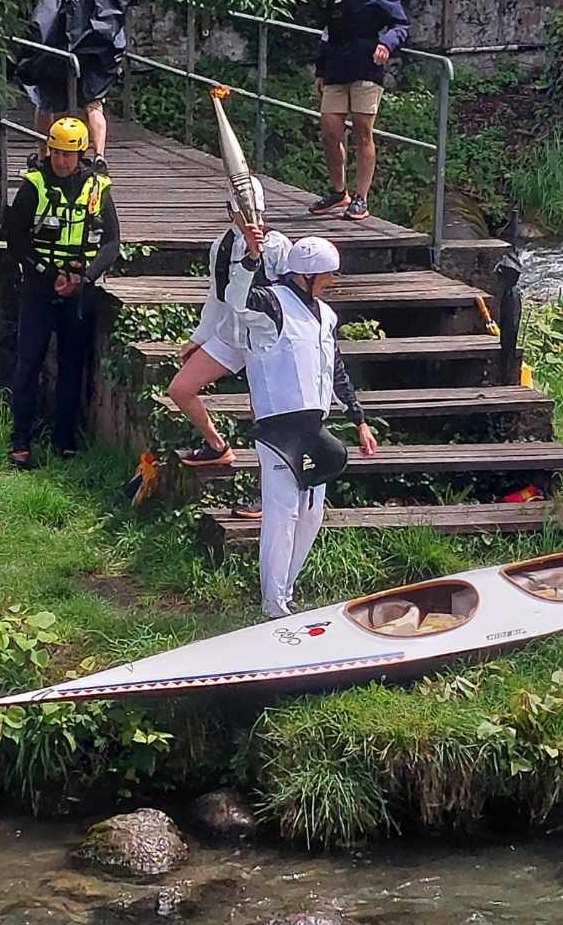
- Bearer of the Olympic flame in Bagnères-de-Bigorre on May 19, 2024
Medal record
Men's canoe slalom
Representing France
Olympic Games
Gold medal – first place	1996 Atlanta	C2
Bronze medal – third place	1992 Barcelona	C2
World Championships
Gold medal – first place	1991 Tacen	C2
Gold medal – first place	1991 Tacen	C2 team
Gold medal – first place	1997 Três Coroas	C2
Gold medal – first place	1997 Três Coroas	C2 team
Silver medal – second place	1993 Mezzana	C2 team
Silver medal – second place	1995 Nottingham	C2
Silver medal – second place	1995 Nottingham	C2 team
Bronze medal – third place	1993 Mezzana	C2
Bronze medal – third place	1999 La Seu d'Urgell	C2 team
European Championships
Silver medal – second place	2000 Mezzana	C2

Frank Adisson (born 24 July 1969, in Tarbes) is a French slalom canoeist. He competed from the late 1980s to the early 2000s, in three Summer Olympics. He won two medals in the C2 event with a gold medal in 1996 and a bronze medal in 1992.

Frank Adisson also won four medals in the C2 event at the ICF Canoe Slalom World Championships with two golds in (1991, 1997), a silver in (1995), and a bronze in (1993). He earned 5 more medals in the C2 team event (2 golds, 2 silvers and 1 bronze).

He won the World Cup series in C2 in 1996 and 1997. He also won a silver medal in the C2 event at the 2000 European Championships.

His partner in the boat throughout the whole of his career was Wilfrid Forgues (now known as Sandra Forgues).

Frank Adisson is also a graduate of the EM Lyon Business School.

== World Cup individual podiums ==
	1st place, gold medalist(s)	2nd place, silver medalist(s)	3rd place, bronze medalist(s)	Total
C2	11	6	6	23

Season	Date	Venue	Position	Event
1990	1 July 1990	Wausau	1st	C2
1990	1990	Savage River	3rd	C2
1990	11 August 1990	Augsburg	3rd	C2
1991	11 July 1991	Reals	3rd	C2
1992	31 May 1992	Nottingham	1st	C2
1993	18 July 1993	La Seu d'Urgell	3rd	C2
1993	25 July 1993	Lofer	3rd	C2
1993	21 August 1993	Minden	2nd	C2
1994	26 June 1994	Nottingham	1st	C2
1994	18 September 1994	Asahi, Aichi	2nd	C2
1995	9 July 1995	Mezzana	2nd	C2
1995	16 July 1995	Lofer	1st	C2
1996	21 April 1996	Ocoee	1st	C2
1996	16 June 1996	Augsburg	1st	C2
1996	29 September 1996	Três Coroas	1st	C2
1997	22 June 1997	Bourg St.-Maurice	1st	C2
1997	29 June 1997	Björbo	2nd	C2
1997	28 July 1997	Ocoee	1st	C2
1998	21 June 1998	Tacen	3rd	C2
1998	28 June 1998	Augsburg	1st	C2
1999	3 October 1999	Penrith	2nd	C2
2000	30 April 2000	Penrith	1st	C2
2000	2 July 2000	Saint-Pé-de-Bigorre	2nd	C2

== Bibliography ==
- DatabaseOlympics.com profile
- Evans, Hilary; Gjerde, Arild; Heijmans, Jeroen; Mallon, Bill; et al. "Frank Adisson". Olympics at Sports-Reference.com. Sports Reference LLC. Archived from the original on 3 February 2013.
