= 1996 Canoe Slalom World Cup =

The 1996 Canoe Slalom World Cup was a series of five races in 4 canoeing and kayaking categories organized by the International Canoe Federation (ICF). It was the 9th edition. The series consisted of 4 regular world cup races and the world cup final.

== Calendar ==
Label	Venue	Date
World Cup Race 1	(United States) Ocoee	19–21 April
World Cup Race 2	(Spain) La Seu d'Urgell	8–9 June
World Cup Race 3	(Germany) Augsburg	15–16 June
World Cup Race 4	(Czech Republic) Prague	24–25 August
World Cup Final	(Brazil) Três Coroas	23–29 September

== Final standings ==
The winner of each world cup race was awarded 25 points. The points scale reached down to 1 point for 15th place. Only the best two results of each athlete from the first 4 world cups plus the result from the world cup final counted for the final world cup standings. If two or more athletes or boats were equal on points, the ranking was determined by their positions in the world cup final.

=== C1 men ===
Pos	Athlete	Points
1	Patrice Estanguet (FRA)	65
2	Sören Kaufmann (GER)	42
3	Michal Martikán (SVK)	40
4	David Hearn (USA)	38
5	Lukáš Pollert (CZE)	38
6	Martin Lang (GER)	34
7	Tony Estanguet (FRA)	33
8	David Jančar (CZE)	32
9	Adam Clawson (USA)	31
10	Simon Hočevar (SLO)	28

=== C2 men ===
Pos	Athletes	Points
1	Frank Adisson/Wilfrid Forgues (FRA)	75
2	Ueli Matti/Peter Matti (SUI)	51
3	Marek Jiras/Tomáš Máder (CZE)	49
4	Fritz Haller/Lecky Haller (USA)	45
5	Milan Kubáň/Marián Olejník (SVK)	39
6	Éric Biau/Bertrand Daille (FRA)	32
7	Miroslav Šimek/Jiří Rohan (CZE)	31
8	Petr Štercl/Pavel Štercl (CZE)	23
9	Manfred Berro/Michael Trummer (GER)	20
9	Thierry Saidi/Emmanuel del Rey (FRA)	20

=== K1 men ===
Pos	Athlete	Points
1	Thomas Becker (GER)	60
2	Scott Shipley (USA)	57
3	Fedja Marušič (SLO)	55
4	Jochen Lettmann (GER)	39
5	Paul Ratcliffe (GBR)	38
6	Enrico Lazzarotto (ITA)	36
7	Ian Wiley (IRL)	25
7	Vincent Fondeviole (FRA)	25
9	Michael Reys (NED)	24
10	Andrew Raspin (GBR)	24

=== K1 women ===
Pos	Athlete	Points
1	Lynn Simpson (GBR)	59
2	Elisabeth Micheler-Jones (GER)	55
3	Štěpánka Hilgertová (CZE)	50
4	Cristina Giai Pron (ITA)	44
5	Marcela Sadilová (CZE)	43
6	Elena Kaliská (SVK)	42
7	Rachel Crosbee (GBR)	38
8	Evi Huss (GER)	32
9	Cathy Hearn (USA)	31
10	Brigitte Guibal (FRA)	30

== Results ==
=== World Cup Race 1 ===
The first world cup race of the season took place at the Ocoee Whitewater Center, Tennessee from 19 to 21 April.

Event	Gold	Score	Silver	Score	Bronze	Score
C1 men	Michal Martikán (SVK)	162.87	Patrice Estanguet (FRA)	165.87	Emmanuel Brugvin (FRA)	166.02
C2 men	France; Frank Adisson; Wilfrid Forgues	171.34	France; Thierry Saidi; Emmanuel del Rey	172.72	Czech Republic; Petr Štercl; Pavel Štercl	175.65
K1 men	Scott Shipley (USA)	148.70	Thomas Becker (GER)	149.18	Jochen Lettmann (GER)	154.41
K1 women	Štěpánka Hilgertová (CZE)	175.10	Elisabeth Micheler-Jones (GER)	175.61	Kordula Striepecke (GER)	179.69

=== World Cup Race 2 ===
The second world cup race of the season took place at the Segre Olympic Park in La Seu d'Urgell, Spain from 8 to 9 June.

Event	Gold	Score	Silver	Score	Bronze	Score
C1 men	Patrice Estanguet (FRA)		David Jančar (CZE)		Justin Boocock (AUS)	
C2 men	Czech Republic; Marek Jiras; Tomáš Máder		Switzerland; Ueli Matti; Peter Matti		France; Pierre Luquet; Christophe Luquet	
K1 men	Ian Wiley (IRL)		Scott Shipley (USA)		Jochen Lettmann (GER)	
K1 women	Lynn Simpson (GBR)		Cristina Giai Pron (ITA)		Marcela Sadilová (CZE)	

=== World Cup Race 3 ===
The third world cup race of the season took place at the Augsburg Eiskanal, Germany from 15 to 16 June.

Event	Gold	Score	Silver	Score	Bronze	Score
C1 men	Martin Lang (GER)	115.68	Sören Kaufmann (GER)	116.61	Michal Martikán (SVK)	118.21
C2 men	France; Frank Adisson; Wilfrid Forgues	124.96	United States; Fritz Haller; Lecky Haller	125.35	Germany; André Ehrenberg; Michael Senft	125.77
K1 men	Fedja Marušič (SLO)	110.37	Thomas Becker (GER)	110.55	Scott Shipley (USA)	110.98
K1 women	Elisabeth Micheler-Jones (GER)	127.72	Rachel Crosbee (GBR)	129.57	Evi Huss (GER)	130.75

=== World Cup Race 4 ===
The fourth world cup race of the season took place at the Prague-Troja Canoeing Centre, Czech Republic from 24 to 25 August.

Event	Gold	Score	Silver	Score	Bronze	Score
C1 men	Tony Estanguet (FRA)	121.53	Lukáš Pollert (CZE)	122.13	Yves Narduzzi (FRA)	123.31
C2 men	Slovakia; Milan Kubáň; Marián Olejník	134.32	Czech Republic; Miroslav Šimek; Jiří Rohan	139.55	France; Gérard Menissier; Claude Menissier	139.73
K1 men	Enrico Lazzarotto (ITA)	118.79	Vincent Fondeviole (FRA)	118.95	Fedja Marušič (SLO)	118.98
K1 women	Štěpánka Hilgertová (CZE)	132.19	Marcela Sadilová (CZE)	132.81	Elena Kaliská (SVK)	134.72

=== World Cup Final ===
The final world cup race of the season took place in Três Coroas, Brazil from 23 to 29 September.

Event	Gold	Score	Silver	Score	Bronze	Score
C1 men	Adam Clawson (USA)	126.03	Patrice Estanguet (FRA)	126.73	David Hearn (USA)	127.54
C2 men	France; Frank Adisson; Wilfrid Forgues	137.00	Switzerland; Ueli Matti; Peter Matti	138.21	United States; Fritz Haller; Lecky Haller	138.34
K1 men	Paul Ratcliffe (GBR)	116.70	Thomas Becker (GER)	117.33	Fedja Marušič (SLO)	119.14
K1 women	Lynn Simpson (GBR)	134.18	Brigitte Guibal (FRA)	135.70	Elena Kaliská (SVK)	136.15
