= Jiří Rohan =

Czechoslovak-Czech slalom canoeist

Medal record

Men's canoe slalom

Representing Czechoslovakia

Olympic Games
Silver medal – second place	1992 Barcelona	C2

World Championships
Gold medal – first place	1985 Augsburg	C2 team
Silver medal – second place	1987 Bourg St.-Maurice	C2 team
Silver medal – second place	1989 Savage River	C2 team
Silver medal – second place	1991 Tacen	C2
Silver medal – second place	1991 Tacen	C2 team

Representing Czech Republic

Olympic Games
Silver medal – second place	1996 Atlanta	C2

World Championships
Gold medal – first place	1993 Mezzana	C2
Gold medal – first place	1993 Mezzana	C2 team
Gold medal – first place	1995 Nottingham	C2 team
Silver medal – second place	1997 Três Coroas	C2 team
Bronze medal – third place	1997 Três Coroas	C2

European Championships
Silver medal – second place	1996 Augsburg	C2

Jiří Rohan (Czech pronunciation: [ˈjɪr̝iː ˈroɦan], born 13 December 1964 in Prague) is a Czechoslovak-Czech slalom canoeist who competed in the 1980s and 1990s. Competing in two Summer Olympics, he won two silver medals in the C2 event, earning them in 1992 and 1996.

Rohan also won a complete set of medals in the C2 event at the ICF Canoe Slalom World Championships with a gold in 1993, a silver in 1991, and a bronze in 1997. He earned seven other medals in the C2 team event (3 golds and 4 silvers).

He won the overall World Cup title in the C2 category six consecutive times between 1990 and 1995. He has also won a silver medal in the C2 event at the 1996 European Championships.

His partner in the boat during most of his active career was Miroslav Šimek.

== World Cup individual podiums ==
	1st place, gold medalist(s)	2nd place, silver medalist(s)	3rd place, bronze medalist(s)	Total
C2	20	10	2	32

Season	Date	Venue	Position	Event
1988	14 August 1988	Nottingham	1st	C2
1988	21 August 1988	Augsburg	2nd	C2
1989	15 Aug 1989	Augsburg	1st	C2
1989	20 Aug 1989	Tacen	1st	C2
1990	1990	Savage River	1st	C2
1990	11 Aug 1990	Augsburg	1st	C2
1990	18 Aug 1990	Bourg St.-Maurice	1st	C2
1990	26 Aug 1990	Tacen	1st	C2
1991	30 Jun 1991	Mezzana	1st	C2
1991	6 Jul 1991	Augsburg	1st	C2
1991	25 Aug 1991	Minden	1st	C2
1991	1 Sep 1991	Wausau	1st	C2
1992	16 Feb 1992	Murupara	1st	C2
1992	23 Feb 1992	Launceston	1st	C2
1992	7 Jun 1992	Merano	3rd	C2
1993	25 Jul 1993	Lofer	1st	C2
1993	1 Aug 1993	Augsburg	2nd	C2
1993	21 Aug 1993	Minden	1st	C2
1993	31 Aug 1993	Ocoee	1st	C2
1994	3 Jul 1994	Augsburg	2nd	C2
1994	10 Jul 1994	Bourg St.-Maurice	1st	C2
1994	17 Jul 1994	La Seu d'Urgell	2nd	C2
1994	18 Sep 1994	Asahi, Aichi	3rd	C2
1995	25 Jun 1995	Prague	2nd	C2
1995	2 Jul 1995	Tacen	1st	C2
1995	9 Jul 1995	Mezzana	1st	C2
1995	16 Jul 1995	Lofer	2nd	C2
1995	1 Oct 1995	Ocoee	1st	C2
1996	25 Aug 1996	Prague	2nd	C2
1997	22 Jun 1997	Bourg St.-Maurice	2nd	C2
1997	6 Jul 1997	Bratislava	2nd	C2
1997	3 Aug 1997	Minden	2nd	C2
