= 1990 Canoe Slalom World Cup =

The 1990 Canoe Slalom World Cup was a series of five races in 4 canoeing and kayaking categories organized by the International Canoe Federation (ICF). It was the 3rd edition. The series consisted of 4 regular world cup races and the world cup final.

== Calendar ==
Label	Venue	Date
World Cup Race 1	(United States) Wausau	30 June - 1 July
World Cup Race 2	(United States) Savage River	
World Cup Race 3	(West Germany) Augsburg	11–12 August
World Cup Race 4	(France) Bourg St.-Maurice	17–18 August
World Cup Final	(Socialist Federal Republic of Yugoslavia) Tacen	25–26 August

== Final standings ==
The winner of each world cup race was awarded 25 points. The points scale reached down to 1 point for 15th place. If two or more athletes or boats were equal on points, the ranking was determined by their positions in the world cup final.

=== C1 men ===
Pos	Athlete	Points
1	Jon Lugbill (USA)	107
2	Carlo Faloci (FRA)	72
3	David Hearn (USA)	70
4	Gareth Marriott (GBR)	59
5	Emmanuel Brugvin (FRA)	50
6	Thierry Humeau (FRA)	35
7	Hervé Delamarre (FRA)	31
8	Jože Vidmar (YUG)	31
9	Jed Prentice (USA)	30
10	Juraj Ontko (TCH)	28

=== C2 men ===
Pos	Athletes	Points
1	Miroslav Šimek/Jiří Rohan (TCH)	109
2	Thierry Saidi/Emmanuel del Rey (FRA)	79
3	Frank Adisson/Wilfrid Forgues (FRA)	77
4	Joe Jacobi/Scott Strausbaugh (USA)	68
5	Lecky Haller/Jamie McEwan (USA)	59
6
7
8
9
10

=== K1 men ===
Pos	Athlete	Points
1	Pierpaolo Ferrazzi (ITA)	81
2	Richard Fox (GBR)	77
3	Luboš Hilgert (TCH)	68
4	Martin Hemmer (FRG)	46
5	Janez Skok (YUG)	44
6	Melvyn Jones (GBR)	40
7	Peter Micheler (LUX)	31
8	Ian Wiley (IRL)	28
9	Marjan Štrukelj (YUG)	27
10	Vincent Fondeviole (FRA)	25

=== K1 women ===
Pos	Athlete	Points
1	Myriam Jerusalmi (FRA)	83
2	Elisabeth Micheler (FRG)	66
3	Štěpánka Hilgertová (TCH)	66
4	Anne Boixel (FRA)	65
5	Dana Chladek (USA)	59
6	Zdenka Grossmannová (TCH)	54
7	Cathy Hearn (USA)	48
8	Eva Roth (FRG)	32
9	Marcela Sadilová (TCH)	26
10	Maria Francis (GBR)	24

== Results ==
=== World Cup Race 1 ===
The first world cup race of the season took place in Wausau, Wisconsin from 30 June to 1 July.

Event	Gold	Score	Silver	Score	Bronze	Score
C1 men	Jon Lugbill (USA)	199.23	David Hearn (USA)	200.97	Carlo Faloci (FRA)	207.53
C2 men	France; Frank Adisson; Wilfrid Forgues		United States; Joe Jacobi; Scott Strausbaugh		Czechoslovakia; Jan Petříček; Tomáš Petříček	
K1 men	Shaun Pearce (GBR)	186.81	Janez Skok (YUG)	189.30	Richard Fox (GBR)	191.37
K1 women	Myriam Jerusalmi (FRA)	216.99	Dana Chladek (USA)	220.36	Štěpánka Hilgertová (TCH)	223.62

=== World Cup Race 2 ===
The second world cup race of the season took place in Savage River, Maryland.

Event	Gold	Score	Silver	Score	Bronze	Score
C1 men	Jon Lugbill (USA)		Gareth Marriott (GBR)		David Hearn (USA)	
C2 men	Czechoslovakia; Miroslav Šimek; Jiří Rohan		France; Thierry Saidi; Emmanuel del Rey		France; Frank Adisson; Wilfrid Forgues	
K1 men	Luboš Hilgert (TCH)		Pierpaolo Ferrazzi (ITA)		Richard Fox (GBR)	
K1 women	Myriam Jerusalmi (FRA)		Dana Chladek (USA)		Anne Boixel (FRA)	

=== World Cup Race 3 ===
The third world cup race of the season took place on the Augsburg Eiskanal from 11 to 12 August.

Event	Gold	Score	Silver	Score	Bronze	Score
C1 men	Jon Lugbill (USA)		David Hearn (USA)		Carlo Faloci (FRA)	
C2 men	Czechoslovakia; Miroslav Šimek; Jiří Rohan	198.40	France; Thierry Saidi; Emmanuel del Rey	200.61	France; Frank Adisson; Wilfrid Forgues	203.96
K1 men	Martin Hemmer (FRG)	177.23	Luboš Hilgert (TCH)	179.14	Peter Micheler (LUX)	179.88
K1 women	Elisabeth Micheler (FRG)	205.83	Kordula Striepecke (GDR)	208.59	Štěpánka Hilgertová (TCH)	211.25

=== World Cup Race 4 ===
The fourth world cup race of the season took place in Bourg St.-Maurice from 17 to 18 August.

Event	Gold	Score	Silver	Score	Bronze	Score
C1 men	Emmanuel Brugvin (FRA)	176.24	Carlo Faloci (FRA)	176.92	David Hearn (USA)	178.35
C2 men	Czechoslovakia; Miroslav Šimek; Jiří Rohan	189.32	France; Jérôme Daille; Gilles Lelievre	189.94	United States; Joe Jacobi; Scott Strausbaugh	190.74
K1 men	Pierpaolo Ferrazzi (ITA)	163.36	Richard Fox (GBR)	164.79	Luboš Hilgert (TCH)	165.34
K1 women	Anne Boixel (FRA)	189.40	Myriam Jerusalmi (FRA)	194.29	Štěpánka Hilgertová (TCH)	194.57

=== World Cup Final ===
The final world cup race of the season took place at the Tacen Whitewater Course from 25 to 26 August.

Event	Gold	Score	Silver	Score	Bronze	Score
C1 men	Martin Lang (FRG)	135.41	Jon Lugbill (USA)	135.45	Oliver Weist (FRG)	135.63
C2 men	Czechoslovakia; Miroslav Šimek; Jiří Rohan	144.46	United States; Jamie McEwan; Lecky Haller	148.59	France; Thierry Saidi; Emmanuel del Rey	149.35
K1 men	Pierpaolo Ferrazzi (ITA)	120.23	Martin Hemmer (FRG)	122.37	Richard Fox (GBR)	124.06
K1 women	Zdenka Grossmannová (TCH)	151.99	Elisabeth Micheler (FRG)	154.20	Eva Roth (FRG)	156.61
