= Anne Boixel =

French slalom canoeist

Medal record

Women's canoe slalom

Representing France

World Championships
Gold medal – first place	1989 Savage River	K1 team
Gold medal – first place	1993 Mezzana	K1 team
Gold medal – first place	1995 Nottingham	K1 team
Silver medal – second place	1993 Mezzana	K1
Silver medal – second place	1995 Nottingham	K1
Silver medal – second place	1997 Três Coroas	K1 team

Anne Boixel (born 12 April 1965 in Rennes) is a French slalom canoeist who competed from the mid-1980s to the late 1990s. She won six medals at the ICF Canoe Slalom World Championships with three golds (K1 team: 1989, 1993, 1995) and three silvers (K1: 1993, 1995; K1 team: 1997).

Boixel also competed in two Summer Olympics, earning her best finish of sixth in the K1 event in Atlanta in 1996.

== World Cup individual podiums ==
Season	Date	Venue	Position	Event
1990	1990	Savage River	3rd	K1
1990	18 Aug 1990	Bourg St.-Maurice	1st	K1
1992	31 May 1992	Nottingham	3rd	K1
1992	20 Jun 1992	Bourg St.-Maurice	1st	K1
1995	9 Jul 1995	Mezzana	3rd	K1
1995	1 Oct 1995	Ocoee	2nd	K1
1997	22 Jun 1997	Bourg St.-Maurice	1st	K1
