= Sandra Forgues =

French slalom canoeist (born 1969)

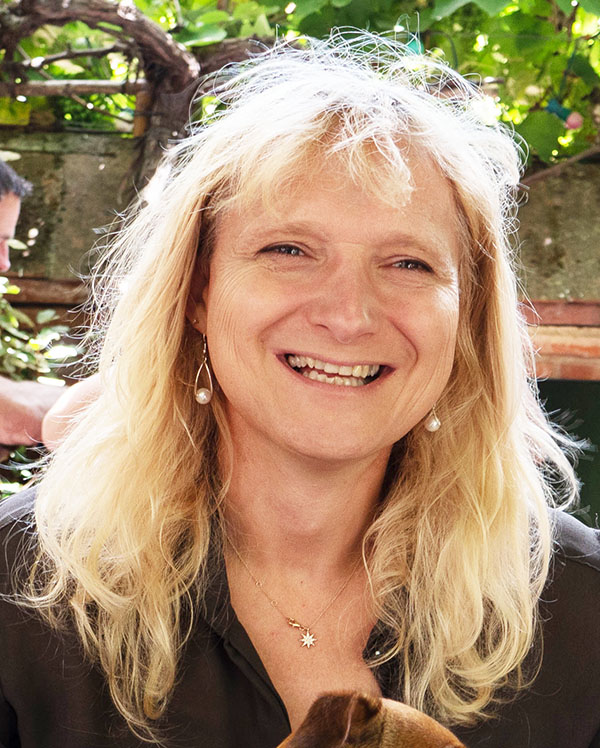
- Forgues in 2020

Medal record

Men's canoe slalom

Representing France

Olympic Games
| Gold medal – first place | 1996 Atlanta | C2 |
| Bronze medal – third place | 1992 Barcelona | C2 |

World Championships
| Gold medal – first place | 1991 Tacen | C2 |
| Gold medal – first place | 1991 Tacen | C2 team |
| Gold medal – first place | 1997 Três Coroas | C2 |
| Gold medal – first place | 1997 Três Coroas | C2 team |
| Silver medal – second place | 1993 Mezzana | C2 team |
| Silver medal – second place | 1995 Nottingham | C2 |
| Silver medal – second place | 1995 Nottingham | C2 team |
| Bronze medal – third place | 1993 Mezzana | C2 |
| Bronze medal – third place | 1999 La Seu d'Urgell | C2 team |

European Championships
| Silver medal – second place | 2000 Mezzana | C2 |

Sandra Forgues (born 22 December 1969, in Tarbes), formerly known as Wilfrid Forgues, is a French slalom canoeist who competed as a male athlete from the late 1980s to the early 2000s (decade). In 2018, Forgues revealed publicly her identity as a trans woman.

== Career ==
Competing in three Summer Olympics, she won two medals in the C2 event with a gold in 1996 and a bronze in 1992.

Forgues also won four medals in the C2 event at the ICF Canoe Slalom World Championships with two golds (1991, 1997), a silver (1995), and a bronze (1993). She earned 5 more medals in the C2 team event (2 golds, 2 silvers and 1 bronze).

Forgues won the World Cup series in C2 in 1996 and 1997. She also won a silver medal in the C2 event at the 2000 European Championships.

Her partner in the boat throughout the whole of her career was Frank Adisson.

== World Cup individual podiums ==
| | 1st place, gold medalist(s) | 2nd place, silver medalist(s) | 3rd place, bronze medalist(s) | Total |
| C2 | 11 | 6 | 6 | 23 |

| Season | Date | Venue | Position | Event |
|---|---|---|---|---|
| 1990 | 1 July 1990 | Wausau | 1st | C2 |
| 1990 | 1990 | Savage River | 3rd | C2 |
| 1990 | 11 August 1990 | Augsburg | 3rd | C2 |
| 1991 | 11 July 1991 | Reals | 3rd | C2 |
| 1992 | 31 May 1992 | Nottingham | 1st | C2 |
| 1993 | 18 July 1993 | La Seu d'Urgell | 3rd | C2 |
| 1993 | 25 July 1993 | Lofer | 3rd | C2 |
| 1993 | 21 August 1993 | Minden | 2nd | C2 |
| 1994 | 26 June 1994 | Nottingham | 1st | C2 |
| 1994 | 18 September 1994 | Asahi, Aichi | 2nd | C2 |
| 1995 | 9 July 1995 | Mezzana | 2nd | C2 |
| 1995 | 16 July 1995 | Lofer | 1st | C2 |
| 1996 | 21 April 1996 | Ocoee | 1st | C2 |
| 1996 | 16 June 1996 | Augsburg | 1st | C2 |
| 1996 | 29 September 1996 | Três Coroas | 1st | C2 |
| 1997 | 22 June 1997 | Bourg St.-Maurice | 1st | C2 |
| 1997 | 29 June 1997 | Björbo | 2nd | C2 |
| 1997 | 28 July 1997 | Ocoee | 1st | C2 |
| 1998 | 21 June 1998 | Tacen | 3rd | C2 |
| 1998 | 28 June 1998 | Augsburg | 1st | C2 |
| 1999 | 3 October 1999 | Penrith | 2nd | C2 |
| 2000 | 30 April 2000 | Penrith | 1st | C2 |
| 2000 | 2 July 2000 | Saint-Pé-de-Bigorre | 2nd | C2 |
