= Miroslav Šimek =

Czechoslovak-Czech slalom canoeist

Medal record

Men's canoe slalom

Representing Czechoslovakia

Olympic Games
| Silver medal – second place | 1992 Barcelona | C2 |

World Championships
| Gold medal – first place | 1985 Augsburg | C2 team |
| Silver medal – second place | 1987 Bourg St.-Maurice | C2 team |
| Silver medal – second place | 1989 Savage River | C2 team |
| Silver medal – second place | 1991 Tacen | C2 |
| Silver medal – second place | 1991 Tacen | C2 team |

Representing Czech Republic

Olympic Games
| Silver medal – second place | 1996 Atlanta | C2 |

World Championships
| Gold medal – first place | 1993 Mezzana | C2 |
| Gold medal – first place | 1993 Mezzana | C2 team |
| Gold medal – first place | 1995 Nottingham | C2 team |
| Silver medal – second place | 1997 Três Coroas | C2 team |
| Bronze medal – third place | 1997 Três Coroas | C2 |

European Championships
| Silver medal – second place | 1996 Augsburg | C2 |

Miroslav Šimek (Czech pronunciation: [ˈmɪroslaf ˈʃɪmɛk], born 27 January 1959 in Turnov) is a Czechoslovak-Czech slalom canoeist who competed from the late 1970s to the late 1990s. Competing in two Summer Olympics, he won two silver medals in the C2 event, earning them in 1992 and 1996.

Šimek also won a complete set of medals in the C2 event at the ICF Canoe Slalom World Championships with a gold in 1993, a silver in 1991, and a bronze in 1997. He earned seven other medals in the C2 team event (3 golds and 4 silvers).

He won the overall World Cup title in the C2 category six consecutive times between 1990 and 1995. He has also won a silver medal in the C2 event at the 1996 European Championships.

His partner in the boat during most of his active career was Jiří Rohan.

== World Cup individual podiums ==
| | 1st place, gold medalist(s) | 2nd place, silver medalist(s) | 3rd place, bronze medalist(s) | Total |
| C2 | 20 | 10 | 2 | 32 |

| Season | Date | Venue | Position | Event |
|---|---|---|---|---|
| 1988 | 14 August 1988 | Nottingham | 1st | C2 |
| 1988 | 21 August 1988 | Augsburg | 2nd | C2 |
| 1989 | 15 Aug 1989 | Augsburg | 1st | C2 |
| 1989 | 20 Aug 1989 | Tacen | 1st | C2 |
| 1990 | 1990 | Savage River | 1st | C2 |
| 1990 | 11 Aug 1990 | Augsburg | 1st | C2 |
| 1990 | 18 Aug 1990 | Bourg St.-Maurice | 1st | C2 |
| 1990 | 26 Aug 1990 | Tacen | 1st | C2 |
| 1991 | 30 Jun 1991 | Mezzana | 1st | C2 |
| 1991 | 6 Jul 1991 | Augsburg | 1st | C2 |
| 1991 | 25 Aug 1991 | Minden | 1st | C2 |
| 1991 | 1 Sep 1991 | Wausau | 1st | C2 |
| 1992 | 16 Feb 1992 | Murupara | 1st | C2 |
| 1992 | 23 Feb 1992 | Launceston | 1st | C2 |
| 1992 | 7 Jun 1992 | Merano | 3rd | C2 |
| 1993 | 25 Jul 1993 | Lofer | 1st | C2 |
| 1993 | 1 Aug 1993 | Augsburg | 2nd | C2 |
| 1993 | 21 Aug 1993 | Minden | 1st | C2 |
| 1993 | 31 Aug 1993 | Ocoee | 1st | C2 |
| 1994 | 3 Jul 1994 | Augsburg | 2nd | C2 |
| 1994 | 10 Jul 1994 | Bourg St.-Maurice | 1st | C2 |
| 1994 | 17 Jul 1994 | La Seu d'Urgell | 2nd | C2 |
| 1994 | 18 Sep 1994 | Asahi, Aichi | 3rd | C2 |
| 1995 | 25 Jun 1995 | Prague | 2nd | C2 |
| 1995 | 2 Jul 1995 | Tacen | 1st | C2 |
| 1995 | 9 Jul 1995 | Mezzana | 1st | C2 |
| 1995 | 16 Jul 1995 | Lofer | 2nd | C2 |
| 1995 | 1 Oct 1995 | Ocoee | 1st | C2 |
| 1996 | 25 Aug 1996 | Prague | 2nd | C2 |
| 1997 | 22 Jun 1997 | Bourg St.-Maurice | 2nd | C2 |
| 1997 | 6 Jul 1997 | Bratislava | 2nd | C2 |
| 1997 | 3 Aug 1997 | Minden | 2nd | C2 |
