= Pierpaolo Ferrazzi =

Italian canoeist (born 1965)

Medal record

Men's canoe slalom

Representing Italy

Olympic Games
Gold medal – first place	1992 Barcelona	K1
Bronze medal – third place	2000 Sydney	K1

World Championships
Silver medal – second place	1989 Savage River	K1 team
Silver medal – second place	2002 Bourg St.-Maurice	K1 team
Silver medal – second place	2005 Penrith	K1 team

European Championships
Gold medal – first place	2000 Mezzana	K1
Gold medal – first place	2000 Mezzana	K1 team
Bronze medal – third place	2005 Tacen	K1 team

Pierpaolo Ferrazzi (born 23 July 1965 in Bassano del Grappa) is an Italian slalom canoeist who competed from the late 1980s to the mid-2000s (decade). Competing in four Summer Olympics, he won two medals in the K1 event with a gold in 1992 and a bronze in 2000.

Ferrazzi also won three silver medals in the K1 team event at the ICF Canoe Slalom World Championships, earning them in 1989, 2002 and 2005.

He won the overall World Cup title in K1 twice (1990 and 1992). At the European Championships he has won a total of three medals (2 golds and 1 bronze).

== World Cup individual podiums ==
	1st place, gold medalist(s)	2nd place, silver medalist(s)	3rd place, bronze medalist(s)	Total
K1	2	11	1	14

Season	Date	Venue	Position	Event
1988	7 August 1988	Dublin	2nd	K1
1989	12 August 1989	Mezzana	3rd	K1
1990	1990	Savage River	2nd	K1
1990	18 August 1990	Bourg St.-Maurice	1st	K1
1990	26 August 1990	Tacen	1st	K1
1992	31 May 1992	Nottingham	2nd	K1
1992	7 June 1992	Merano	2nd	K1
1993	31 August 1993	Ocoee	2nd	K1
1994	10 July 1994	Bourg St.-Maurice	2nd	K1
1995	9 July 1995	Mezzana	2nd	K1
1998	14 June 1998	Liptovský Mikuláš	2nd	K1
2000	30 April 2000	Penrith	2nd	K1
2000	23 July 2000	Prague	2nd	K1
2001	28 July 2001	Augsburg	2nd	K1
