= Rebuilt: The Human Body Shop =

- Genre: Reality-tv
- Country of origin: United States
- Original language: English
- No. of seasons: 1
- No. of episodes: 8

Production
- Executive producers: Glenda Hersh; Alexandra Jewitt; Steven Weinstock
- Producers: Leah Bankston; Andrew Goldman; D.T. Slouffman; Chris Voos; Andrew Wagner; Andrew E. Wagner; Tommy Walker
- Running time: 60 Minutes
- Production companies: A-III Production; True Entertainment

Original release
- Network: Discovery Health Channel
- Release: January 18 – April 5, 2006

Rebuilt: The Human Body Shop was a Discovery Health Channel reality television series featuring the Orthotic Prosthetic Center, a prosthetics lab in Fairfax, Virginia.

== Plot ==
Rebuilt: The Human Body Shop focuses on the world of orthotics and prosthetics.

Each episode features three people in the process of acquiring prosthetic limbs and small side-stories about the goings-on within the office.

== Cast ==
- Elliot Weintrob as himself
- Joan Weintrob as herself
- Harry Weintrob as himself
- Mark Latta as himself
- Angela Boncz as herself

== Series overview ==
Season	Episodes	Originally released	
Season	Episodes	First released	Last released
1	8	January 18, 2006	March 22, 2006

== Episodes ==
=== Series 1 (2006) ===
No.	Title	Original release date
1	"Going for the Gold"	18 January 2006
A prosthetic bike leg is constructed; a teen born without hands or feet competes at a swim meet; a woman who lost her right hand gets a replacement glove.
2	"Game of Life"	25 January 2006
Elliot makes plans to redecorate the OPC (Orthotic Prosthetic Center) offices in secret, but his mother finds out and puts a stop to it.
3	"Breaking Down Barriers"	1 February 2006
Elliot challenges his staff to become physically fit and they agree, but only if there are rewards for getting in shape.
4	"A Child's Courage"	8 February 2006
Profiles of Joan and Harry Weintrob, founders of the family business. Also: a woman with sacral agenesis, a disorder of the lower spine and pelvis; an above-the-knee amputee.
5	"A Soldier's Triumph"	1 March 2006
The front-office girls challenge Elliot, Mark and Angela to a bowling showdown, and competitive qualities are revealed on both teams.
6	"A New Lease on Life"	8 March 2006
A father of two has his feet amputated because of chronic foot problems and gets a set of prosthetics, but he must learn to walk again.
7	"Failure's Not an Option"	15 March 2006
A woman missing both her legs has an emergency medical crisis. Also: Elliot tests one of his patients when they go kayaking.
8	"The Ultimate Survivors"	22 March 2006
American soldiers who lost limbs in the war come home and learn to ski; a man who lost his leg when he stepped on a land mine starts a network to help others.

== See also ==
- Elliot Weintrob
- Orthotic Prosthetic Center
