= Fritz Haller =

American slalom canoeist

Medal record

Men's canoe slalom

Representing United States

World Championships
Gold medal – first place	1981 Bala	Mixed C2
Gold medal – first place	1983 Meran	C2
Silver medal – second place	1983 Meran	C2 team
Bronze medal – third place	1985 Augsburg	C2 team

Fritz Haller is an American slalom canoeist who competed from the early 1980s to the mid-1990s. He won four medals at the ICF Canoe Slalom World Championships with two golds (C2: 1983; mixed C2: 1981) a silver (C2 team: 1983) and a bronze (C2 team: 1985).

Most of his career he was partnered by his older brother Lecky Haller.

== World Cup individual podiums ==
Season	Date	Venue	Position	Event
1993	31 Aug 1993	Ocoee	3rd	C2
1994	18 Sep 1994	Asahi, Aichi	1st	C2
1995	25 Jun 1995	Prague	1st	C2
1995	1 Oct 1995	Ocoee	2nd	C2
1996	16 Jun 1996	Augsburg	2nd	C2
1996	29 Sep 1996	Três Coroas	3rd	C2
