= 1993 ICF Canoe Slalom World Championships =

Canoe slalom event in Mezzana, Italy

The 1993 ICF Canoe Slalom World Championships were held in Mezzana, Italy under the auspices of International Canoe Federation. It was the 23rd edition. It was the first time that the Czech Republic and Slovakia competed as separate nations following the dissolution of Czechoslovakia earlier that year.

== Medal summary ==
=== Men's ===
==== Canoe ====
Event	Gold	Points	Silver	Points	Bronze	Points
C1	Martin Lang (GER)	140.44	Hervé Delamarre (FRA)	140.92	Sören Kaufmann (GER)	142.98
C1 team	Slovenia; Jože Vidmar; Boštjan Žitnik; Simon Hočevar	173.88	United Kingdom; Bill Horsman; Gareth Marriott; Mark Delaney	174.39	Italy; Francesco Stefani; Luca Dalla Libera; Renato de Monti	175.85
C2	Czech Republic; Jiří Rohan; Miroslav Šimek	144.63	France; Éric Biau; Bertrand Daille	148.53	France; Frank Adisson; Wilfrid Forgues	150.57
C2 team	Czech Republic; Marek Jiras & Tomáš Máder; Petr Štercl & Pavel Štercl; Jiří Rohan & Miroslav Šimek	172.85	France; Éric Biau & Bertrand Daille; Emmanuel del Rey & Thierry Saidi; Frank Adisson & Wilfrid Forgues	173.76	Slovakia; Roman Štrba & Roman Vajs; Juraj Ontko & Ladislav Čáni; Viktor Beneš & Milan Kučera	181.08

==== Kayak ====
Event	Gold	Points	Silver	Points	Bronze	Points
K1	Richard Fox (GBR)	119.95	Richard Weiss (USA)	120.52	Melvyn Jones (GBR)	122.37
K1 team	United Kingdom; Richard Fox; Melvyn Jones; Shaun Pearce	153.91	France; Manuel Brissaud; Vincent Fondeviole; Sylvain Curinier	156.20	Czech Republic; Vojtěch Bareš; Pavel Přindiš; Luboš Hilgert	157.61

=== Women's ===
==== Kayak ====
Event	Gold	Points	Silver	Points	Bronze	Points
K1	Myriam Jerusalmi (FRA)	144.89	Anne Boixel (FRA)	149.41	Marianne Agulhon (FRA)	150.04
K1 team	France; Myriam Jerusalmi; Sylvie Lepeltier; Anne Boixel	180.78	United States; Jana Freeburn; Cathy Hearn; Dana Chladek	189.25	United Kingdom; Maria Lund; Rachel Crosbee; Lynn Simpson	194.55

== Medals table ==
Rank	Nation	Gold	Silver	Bronze	Total
1	France (FRA)	2	5	2	9
2	Great Britain (GBR)	2	1	2	5
3	Czech Republic (CZE)	2	0	1	3
4	Germany (GER)	1	0	1	2
5	Slovenia (SLO)	1	0	0	1
6	United States (USA)	0	2	0	2
7	Italy (ITA)	0	0	1	1
7	Slovakia (SVK)	0	0	1	1
Totals (8 entries)		8	8	8	24
