= Sylvain Curinier =

French slalom canoeist

Medal record

Men's canoe slalom

Representing France

Olympic Games
Silver medal – second place	1992 Barcelona	K1

World Championships
Silver medal – second place	1993 Mezzana	K1 team

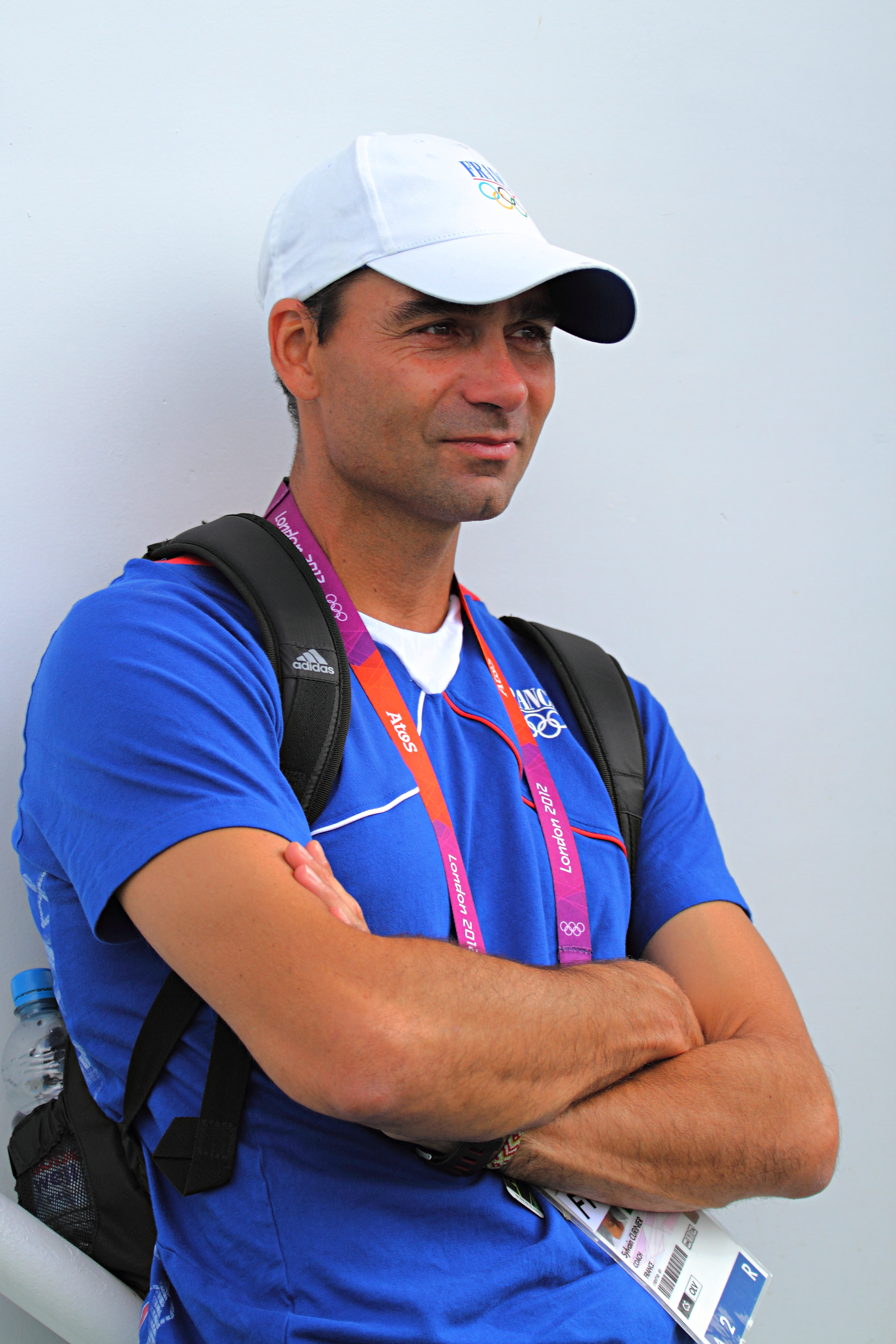
Sylvain Curinier Olympic games london 2012

Sylvain Curinier (born 15 March 1969 in Lons-le-Saunier) is a French slalom canoeist who competed from the mid-1980s to the mid-1990s. He won a silver medal in the K1 event at the 1992 Summer Olympics in Barcelona.

Curinier also won a silver medal in the K1 team event at the 1993 ICF Canoe Slalom World Championships in Mezzana.

== World Cup individual podiums ==
Season	Date	Venue	Position	Event
1993	25 Jul 1993	Lofer	1st	K1
