= Joe Jacobi =

American former slalom canoeist

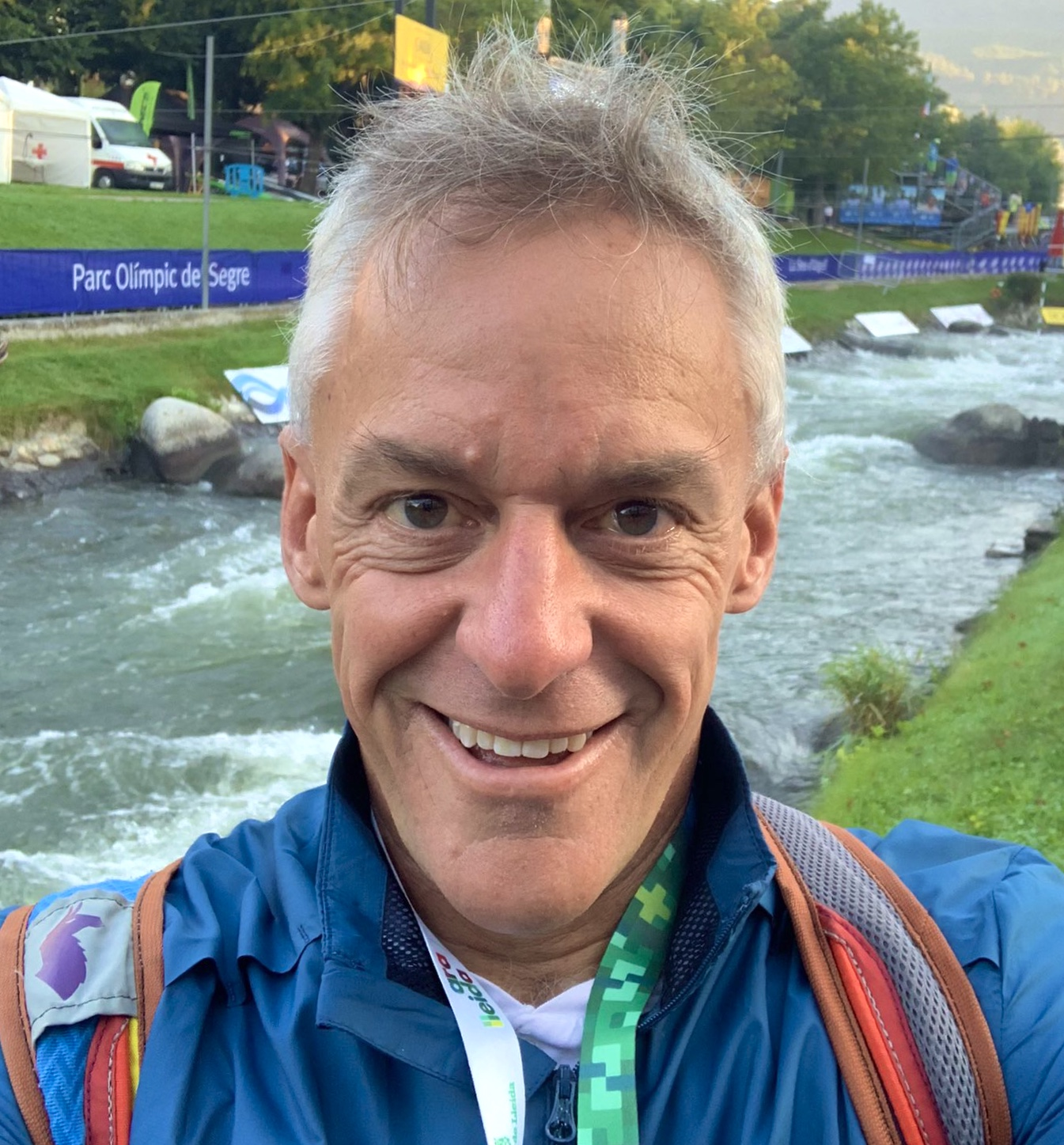
- Jacobi in 2021

Personal information
- Full name: Joseph Bennet Jacobi
- Born: September 26, 1969 (age 56) Washington, D.C., U.S.
Medal record
Men's canoe slalom
Representing the United States
Olympic Games
Gold medal – first place	1992 Barcelona	C2

Joseph Bennet Jacobi (born September 26, 1969 in Washington, D.C.) is an American former slalom canoeist who competed from the mid-1980s to the mid-2000s. Competing in two Summer Olympics, he won a gold medal in the C2 event at Barcelona in 1992.

== Biography ==
Jacobi began canoeing at a day camp in Maryland. After growing up paddling on the Potomac River, Jacobi took his talents to the international stage and competed in twenty countries, winning Whitewater National Championships in Australia, the Czech Republic, Costa Rica, Chile, and the U.S. Jacobi won the C2 U.S. National Championship for five consecutive years (1988–1992), and finished second in the overall standings of the C1 Champion International Whitewater series in 1991 and 1995 (he also placed fifth in 1992 and third in 1994).

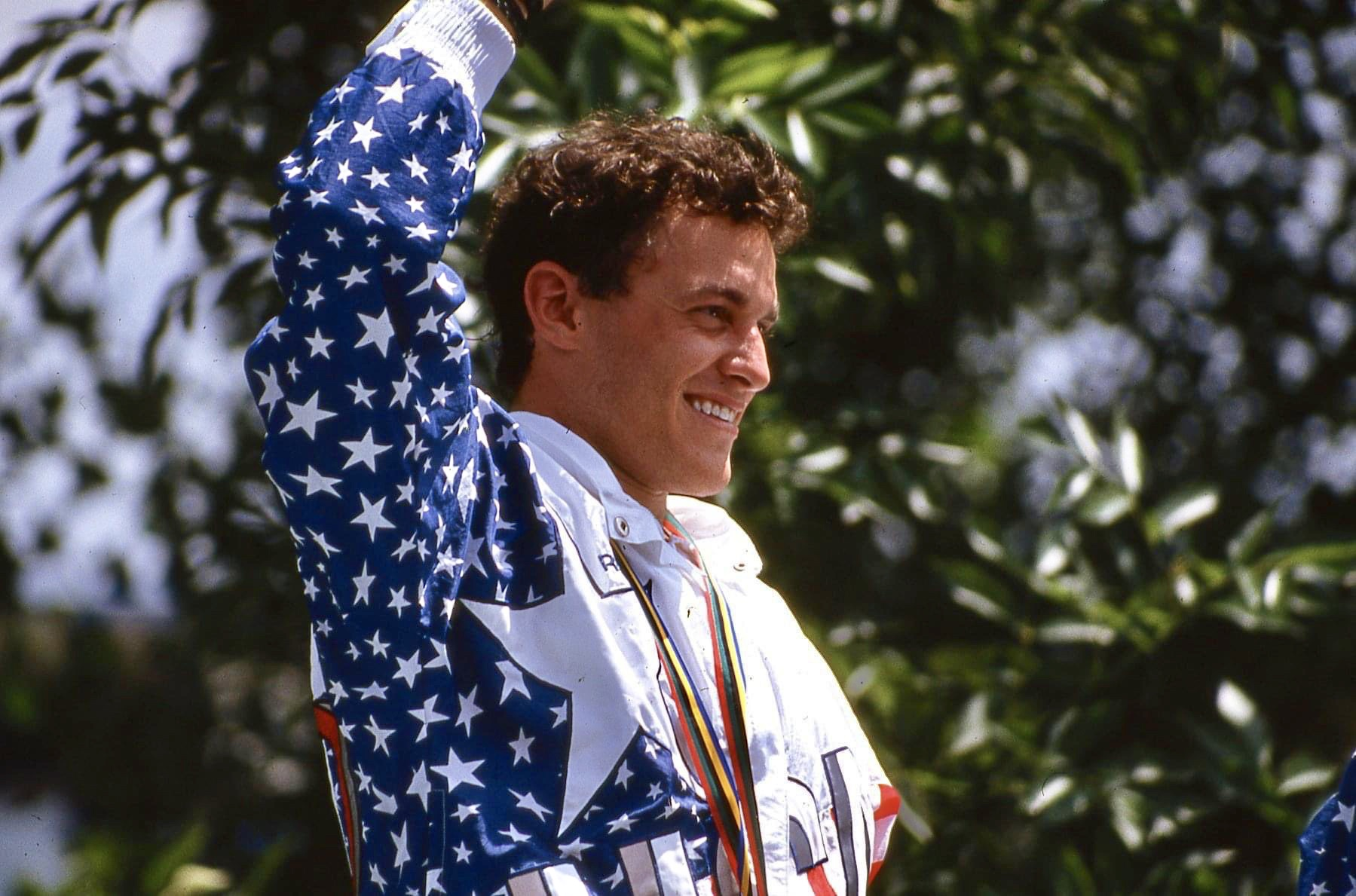
Jacobi in 1992

Jacobi was a member of the United States' canoe team at the 1992 Barcelona Olympics, competing in the C2 slalom event. He and his partner Scott Strausbaugh captured the gold medal, the first American team in Olympic history to capture a gold medal in whitewater slalom. Jacobi finished in second place in his single canoe class at the 2000 Olympic Trials and was an alternate for the American team; he did not compete in Sydney. After 2000, Jacobi continued to compete at a high level, he captured the U.S. Championship in 2002 and then finished ninth at the 2003 World Championships with teammate Matt Taylor. In 2000, Jacobi was named 'Paddler of the Century' by Paddler Magazine. On December 15, 2001, Jacobi carried the Olympic torch through Nashville, Tennessee as it made its way to Salt Lake City, Utah, for the 2002 Winter Games. Jacobi stated, "With the recent challenges confronting our society, the upcoming Winter Olympics in Salt Lake City not only offer a tremendous element of healing for our country, but also a source of inspiration for the entire world."

At the age of 34, Jacobi returned to the Olympic stage in 2004 at the Athens Games. With teammate Matt Taylor, Jacobi qualified for the Olympics via a ninth-place finish at the 2003 World Championships and a victory at the U.S. Olympic Trials. Jacobi and Taylor finished 9th in the first run of the C2 heats at Athens 2004 (116.01) held on August 19. They picked up the pace later that day in the second run, coming in 6th with a much better time (107.42). The duo qualified for the C2 doubles semifinals held on August 20, and started 5th. The Americans finished 8th (111.14), while only the top six results qualified for the final.

In 2010, Jacobi became the Chief Executive Officer for USA Canoe/Kayak, the national governing body for Olympic level paddle sports in the United States.

Jacobi served as an analyst for NBC Sports coverage of Canoeing at the 2008 Summer Olympics.

His gold medal was stolen out of his backpack in Atlanta, Georgia; it was found in 2016.

== World Cup individual podiums ==
Season	Date	Venue	Position	Event
1990	1 Jul 1990	Wausau	2nd	C2
1990	18 Aug 1990	Bourg St.-Maurice	3rd	C2
1991	30 Jun 1991	Mezzana	3rd	C2
2000	18 Jun 2000	Ocoee	2nd	C1

== See also ==
- List of notable Jewish canoeist
