= Francesco Stefani =

Italian canoeist

Medal record

Men's canoe slalom

Representing Italy

World Championships
Bronze medal – third place	1993 Mezzana	C-1 team

Francesco Stefani (born 17 April 1971 in Bassano del Grappa) is an Italian slalom canoeist who competed from the late 1980s to the mid-2000s. He won a bronze medal in the C-1 team event at the 1993 ICF Canoe Slalom World Championships in Mezzana.

Stefani also finished 26th in the C-1 event at the 1996 Summer Olympics in Atlanta.
