= Ladislav Čáni =

Slovak slalom canoeist

Medal record

Men's canoe slalom

Representing Slovakia

World Championships
Bronze medal – third place	1993 Mezzana	C2 team

Ladislav Čáni is a retired Slovak slalom canoeist who competed at the 1993 ICF Canoe Slalom World Championships in Mezzana, where he won a bronze medal in the C2 team event. He also finished 18th in the C2 event at the same championships while being partnered by Juraj Ontko. It was his only appearance in a major international competition.
