= Emmanuel del Rey =

French slalom canoeist

Medal record

Men's canoe slalom

Representing France

World Championships
Gold medal – first place	1989 Savage River	C2 team
Gold medal – first place	1991 Tacen	C2 team
Gold medal – first place	1997 Três Coroas	C2 team
Silver medal – second place	1985 Augsburg	C2 team
Silver medal – second place	1993 Mezzana	C2 team
Silver medal – second place	1995 Nottingham	C2 team
Bronze medal – third place	1989 Savage River	C2
Bronze medal – third place	1991 Tacen	C2

Emmanuel del Rey (born 18 May 1966, in Épinal) is a French slalom canoeist who competed from the mid-1980s to the late 1990s. He specialized in the C2 event with Thierry Saidi being his partner in the boat.

He won eight medals at the ICF Canoe Slalom World Championships with three golds (C2 team: 1989, 1991, 1997), three silvers (C2 team: 1985, 1993, 1995) and two bronzes (C2: 1989, 1991).

Del Rey also competed in two Summer Olympics, earning his best finish of fifth in the C2 event in Atlanta in 1996.

== World Cup individual podiums ==
	1st place, gold medalist(s)	2nd place, silver medalist(s)	3rd place, bronze medalist(s)	Total
C2	4	3	3	10

Season	Date	Venue	Position	Event
1988	7 August 1988	Dublin	3rd	C2
1989	12 Aug 1989	Mezzana	1st	C2
1990	1990	Savage River	2nd	C2
1990	11 Aug 1990	Augsburg	2nd	C2
1990	26 Aug 1990	Tacen	3rd	C2
1993	1 Aug 1993	Augsburg	1st	C2
1994	3 Jul 1994	Augsburg	1st	C2
1994	10 Jul 1994	Bourg St.-Maurice	3rd	C2
1994	17 Jul 1994	La Seu d'Urgell	1st	C2
1996	21 Apr 1996	Ocoee	2nd	C2
