= Ludovic Boulesteix =

French slalom canoeist

Medal record

Men's canoe slalom

Representing France

World Championships
Silver medal – second place	1997 Três Coroas	K1 team

Ludovic Boulesteix (born 13 July 1973) is a French slalom canoeist who competed in the 1990s. He won a silver medal in the K1 team event at the 1997 ICF Canoe Slalom World Championships in Três Coroas.

== World Cup individual podiums ==
Season	Date	Venue	Position	Event
1997	28 Jul 1997	Ocoee	3rd	K1
