= Anouk Loubie =

French slalom canoeist (born 1969)

Medal record

Women's canoe slalom

Representing France

World Championships
Gold medal – first place	1991 Tacen	K1 team
Silver medal – second place	1997 Três Coroas	K1 team

Junior World Championships
Gold medal – first place	1986 Spittal	K1

Anouk Loubie (born 1969) is a French slalom canoeist who competed at the international level from 1986 to 1998.

She won two medals in the K1 team event at the ICF Canoe Slalom World Championships with a gold in 1991 and a silver in 1997.

== World Cup individual podiums ==
Season	Date	Venue	Position	Event
1989	12 Aug 1989	Mezzana	1st	K1
1994	10 Jul 1994	Bourg St.-Maurice	1st	K1
