= Bill Horsman =

Bill Horsman may refer to:

- Bill Horsman (footballer)
- Bill Horsman (canoeist)
