= Udo Raumann =

German slalom canoeist (born 1969)

Medal record

Men's canoe slalom

Representing Germany

World Championships
Bronze medal – third place	1995 Nottingham	C-2 team

European Championships
Gold medal – first place	1996 Augsburg	C-2 team

Udo Raumann (born 1 May 1969 in Düren) is a German slalom canoeist who competed in the early-to-mid 1990s. He won a bronze medal in the C-2 team event at the 1995 ICF Canoe Slalom World Championships in Nottingham. He also won a gold medal in the same event at the 1996 European Championships in Augsburg.

He finished 14th in the C-2 event at the 1992 Summer Olympics in Barcelona.

His partner throughout the whole of his active career was Rüdiger Hübbers.
