= Jean-Michel Regnier =

French slalom canoeist

Medal record

Men's canoe slalom

Representing France

World Championships
| Gold medal – first place | 1991 Tacen | K-1 team |
| Silver medal – second place | 1997 Três Coroas | K-1 team |

Jean-Michel Regnier is a French slalom canoeist who competed from the late 1980s to the late 1990s. He won two medals in the K-1 team event at the ICF Canoe Slalom World Championships with a gold in 1991 and a silver in 1997.
