= Martin Hemmer =

German canoeist

Medal record

Men's canoe slalom

World Championships

Representing West Germany
Bronze medal – third place	1989 Savage River	K1 team

Representing Germany
Bronze medal – third place	1991 Tacen	K1

Martin Hemmer is a West German-German slalom canoeist who competed from the late 1980s to the early 1990s. He won two bronze medals at the ICF Canoe Slalom World Championships (K1: 1991, K1 team: 1989).

== World Cup individual podiums ==
Season	Date	Venue	Position	Event
1990	11 Aug 1990	Augsburg	1st	K1
1990	26 Aug 1990	Tacen	2nd	K1
