= Kirsten Venetta Brown =

American canoeist

Medal record

Women's canoe slalom

Representing United States

World Championships
Bronze medal – third place	1991 Tacen	K-1 team

Kirsten Venetta Brown, also known as Kirsten Brown-Fleshman (June 11, 1963 – October 21, 2006), was an American slalom canoeist who competed in the early and mid-1990s. She won a bronze medal in the K-1 team event at the 1991 ICF Canoe Slalom World Championships in Tacen. She missed out on competing in the 1992 Olympic Games after part of her kayak touched a gate.

She first kayaked as a child at Valley Mill Camp in Maryland. She studied political science at MIT, gaining a BA in 1986, and worked at Arthur Andersen from 1987-1989. She died, aged 43, from breast cancer, in Washington, D.C. She was married and divorced from George Michael Fleshman.
