= Isabelle Despres =

French slalom canoeist

Medal record

Women's canoe slalom

Representing France

World Championships
Gold medal – first place	1995 Nottingham	K1 team

Isabelle Despres (born 8. August 1973) is a French slalom canoeist who competed from the early 1990s to the early 2000s. She won a gold medal in the K1 team event at the 1995 ICF Canoe Slalom World Championships in Nottingham.

== World Cup individual podiums ==
Season	Date	Venue	Position	Event
1994	17 Jul 1994	La Seu d'Urgell	3rd	K1
