= Vincent Fondeviole =

French slalom canoeist

Medal record

Men's canoe slalom

Representing France

World Championships
Silver medal – second place	1993 Mezzana	K1 team
Silver medal – second place	1997 Três Coroas	K1 team

Vincent Fondeviole (born 17 February 1965 in Saint-Sever) is a French slalom canoeist who competed in the 1990s. He won two silver medals in the K1 team event at the ICF Canoe Slalom World Championships, earning them in 1993 and 1997.

Fondeviole also finished 14th in the K1 event at the 1992 Summer Olympics in Barcelona.

== World Cup individual podiums ==
Season	Date	Venue	Position	Event
1992	20 Jun 1992	Bourg St.-Maurice	3rd	K1
1994	3 Jul 1994	Augsburg	3rd	K1
1995	16 Jul 1995	Lofer	3rd	K1
1996	25 Aug 1996	Prague	2nd	K1
