= 1995 ICF Canoe Slalom World Championships =

Canoe slalom event in Nottingham, England

The 1995 ICF Canoe Slalom World Championships were held in Nottingham, United Kingdom under the auspices of International Canoe Federation at the Holme Pierrepont National Watersports Centre. It was the 24th edition. Nottingham became the first city to host the canoe slalom and canoe sprint world championships, having hosted the sprint championships previously in 1981.

== Medal summary ==
=== Men's ===
==== Canoe ====
Event	Gold	Points	Silver	Points	Bronze	Points
C1	David Hearn (USA)	134.86	Sören Kaufmann (GER)	135.72	Michal Martikán (SVK)	135.97
C1 team	Germany; Vitus Husek; Sören Kaufmann; Martin Lang	166.05	Croatia; Danko Herceg; Zlatko Sedlar; Stjepan Perestegi	171.25	Slovakia; Michal Martikán; Juraj Minčík; Juraj Ontko	173.23
C2	Poland; Krzysztof Kołomański; Michał Staniszewski	138.61	France; Frank Adisson; Wilfrid Forgues	139.09	France; Éric Biau; Bertrand Daille	140.25
C2 team	Czech Republic; Jiří Rohan & Miroslav Šimek; Petr Štercl & Pavel Štercl; Jaroslav Pospíšil & Jaroslav Pollert	178.87	France; Emmanuel del Rey & Thierry Saidi; Frank Adisson & Wilfrid Forgues; Éric Biau & Bertrand Daille	186.05	Germany; Michael Trummer & Manfred Berro; Rüdiger Hübbers & Udo Raumann; André Ehrenberg & Michael Senft	187.85

==== Kayak ====
Event	Gold	Points	Silver	Points	Bronze	Points
K1	Oliver Fix (GER)	125.72	Scott Shipley (USA)	127.09	Jiří Prskavec (CZE)	127.47
K1 team	Germany; Jochen Lettmann; Thomas Becker; Oliver Fix	145.27	Slovenia; Fedja Marušič; Marjan Štrukelj; Andraž Vehovar	152.31	United Kingdom; Andrew Raspin; Shaun Pearce; Ian Raspin	153.41

=== Women's ===
==== Kayak ====
Event	Gold	Points	Silver	Points	Bronze	Points
K1	Lynn Simpson (GBR)	140.81	Anne Boixel (FRA)	142.32	Kordula Striepecke (GER)	143.61
K1 team	France; Anne Boixel; Myriam Fox-Jerusalmi; Isabelle Despres	175.82	United Kingdom; Lynn Simpson; Rachel Crosbee; Heather Corrie	180.64	Germany; Evi Huss; Elisabeth Micheler-Jones; Kordula Striepecke	182.33

== Medals table ==
Rank	Nation	Gold	Silver	Bronze	Total
1	Germany (GER)	3	1	3	7
2	France (FRA)	1	3	1	5
3	Great Britain (GBR)	1	1	1	3
4	United States (USA)	1	1	0	2
5	Czech Republic (CZE)	1	0	1	2
6	Poland (POL)	1	0	0	1
7	Croatia (CRO)	0	1	0	1
7	Slovenia (SLO)	0	1	0	1
9	Slovakia (SVK)	0	0	2	2
Totals (9 entries)		8	8	8	24
