= Marianne Agulhon =

French slalom canoeist

Medal record

Women's canoe slalom

Representing France

World Championships
Gold medal – first place	1991 Tacen	K1 team
Bronze medal – third place	1993 Mezzana	K1

Marianne Agulhon (born 19 March 1966 in Oujda, Morocco) is a French slalom canoeist who competed from the late 1980s to the mid-1990s. She won two medals at the ICF Canoe Slalom World Championships with a gold (K1 team: 1991) and a bronze (K1: 1993).

Agulhon also finished fifth in the K1 event at the 1992 Summer Olympics in Barcelona.

== World Cup individual podiums ==
Season	Date	Venue	Position	Event
1992	31 May 1992	Nottingham	1st	K1
1992	20 Jun 1992	Bourg St.-Maurice	2nd	K1
1993	21 Aug 1993	Minden	3rd	K1
