= 1991 ICF Canoe Slalom World Championships =

Canoe slalom event in Tacen, Yugoslavia

The 1991 ICF Canoe Slalom World Championships were held in Tacen, Yugoslavia (now in Slovenia) under the auspices of International Canoe Federation at the Tacen Whitewater Course. It was the 22nd edition. This was one of the last events held in Yugoslavia prior to the Yugoslav wars and subsequent breakup. Slovenia would declare its independence on 25 June, just two days after the event ended. It also marked the first time Germany competed as a nation following the reunification of East Germany and West Germany the previous year.

== Medal summary ==
=== Men's ===
==== Canoe ====
Event	Gold	Points	Silver	Points	Bronze	Points
C1	Martin Lang (GER)	160.19	Adam Clawson (USA)	164.26	Jacky Avril (FRA)	166.27
C1 team	United States; Adam Clawson; Jon Lugbill; Jed Prentice	198.23	France; Jacky Avril; Hervé Delamarre; Emmanuel Brugvin	203.57	United Kingdom; Mark Delaney; Bill Horsman; Gareth Marriott	219.34
C2	France; Frank Adisson; Wilfrid Forgues	174.79	Czechoslovakia; Jiří Rohan; Miroslav Šimek	175.30	France; Emmanuel del Rey; Thierry Saidi	177.17
C2 team	France; Frank Adisson & Wilfrid Forgues; Thierry Saidi & Emmanuel del Rey; Gilles Lelievre & Jérôme Daille	211.15	Czechoslovakia; Jiří Rohan & Miroslav Šimek; Petr Štercl & Pavel Štercl; Viktor Beneš & Milan Kučera	224.01	Germany; Michael Trummer & Manfred Berro; Stephan Bittner & Volker Nerlich; Frank Hemmer & Thomas Loose	238.54

==== Kayak ====
Event	Gold	Points	Silver	Points	Bronze	Points
K1	Shaun Pearce (GBR)	143.65	Marjan Štrukelj (YUG)	146.40	Martin Hemmer (GER)	147.51
K1 team	France; Manuel Brissaud; Gilles Clouzeau; Jean-Michel Regnier	175.36	Germany; Thomas Becker; Michael Glöckle; Michael Seibert	181.23	Czechoslovakia; Luboš Hilgert; Peter Nagy; Pavel Přindiš	183.21

=== Women's ===
==== Kayak ====
Event	Gold	Points	Silver	Points	Bronze	Points
K1	Elisabeth Micheler (GER)	181.08	Dana Chladek (USA)	184.00	Kordula Striepecke (GER)	185.66
K1 team	France; Myriam Jerusalmi; Anouk Loubie; Marianne Agulhon	215.56	Czechoslovakia; Zdenka Grossmannová; Štěpánka Hilgertová; Marcela Sadilová	251.60	United States; Kirsten Brown-Fleshman; Dana Chladek; Kara Ruppel	272.12

== Medals table ==
Rank	Nation	Gold	Silver	Bronze	Total
1	France (FRA)	4	1	2	7
2	Germany (GER)	2	1	3	6
3	United States (USA)	1	2	1	4
4	Great Britain (GBR)	1	0	1	2
5	Czechoslovakia (TCH)	0	3	1	4
6	Yugoslavia (YUG)	0	1	0	1
Totals (6 entries)		8	8	8	24
