= Pavel Přindiš =

Czechoslovak-Czech slalom canoeist (born 1961)

Medal record

Men's canoe slalom

Representing Czechoslovakia

World Championships
Bronze medal – third place	1991 Tacen	K1 team

Representing Czech Republic

World Championships
Bronze medal – third place	1993 Mezzana	K1 team

Pavel Přindiš (born August 17, 1961 in Olomouc) is a Czechoslovak-Czech slalom canoeist who competed from the late 1980s to the mid-1990s. He won two bronze medals in the K1 team event at the ICF Canoe Slalom World Championships (1991 for Czechoslovakia, 1993 for the Czech Republic).

Přindiš also finished 24th in the K1 event at the 1992 Summer Olympics in Barcelona.

His son Vít is also a medalist from World Championships.

== World Cup individual podiums ==
Season	Date	Venue	Position	Event
1992	20 Jun 1992	Bourg St.-Maurice	2nd	K1
