= Scott Strausbaugh =

American slalom canoeist (born 1963)

Personal information
- Born: July 23, 1963 (age 63) York, Pennsylvania, U.S.
Medal record
Men's canoe slalom
Representing the United States
Olympic Games
Gold medal – first place	1992 Barcelona	C2

Scott D. Strausbaugh (born July 23, 1963, in York, Pennsylvania) is an American slalom canoeist who competed in the late 1980s and early 1990s. He won a gold medal in the C2 event at the 1992 Summer Olympics in Barcelona, partnering Joe Jacobi.

== World Cup individual podiums ==
Season	Date	Venue	Position	Event
1990	1 Jul 1990	Wausau	2nd	C2
1990	18 Aug 1990	Bourg St.-Maurice	3rd	C2
1991	30 Jun 1991	Mezzana	3rd	C2
