= Mark Delaney (canoeist) =

British whitewater slalom canoeist

Medal record

Men's canoe slalom

Representing Great Britain

World Championships
Silver medal – second place	1993 Mezzana	C1 team
Bronze medal – third place	1991 Tacen	C1 team

European Championships
Bronze medal – third place	1998 Roudnice nad Labem	C1 team

Mark Delaney (born 13 July 1964 in Cambridge) is a British whitewater slalom canoeist who competed from the mid-1980s to the early 2000s. He won two medals in the C1 team event at the ICF Canoe Slalom World Championships with a silver in 1993 and a bronze in 1991. He also has a bronze from the same event from the 1998 European Championships in Roudnice nad Labem.

== Career ==
Delaney also competed in two Summer Olympic Games, earning his best finish of 14th in the C1 event in Atlanta in 1996.

He also won a bronze medal at the 1995 World Cup race in Tacen.

Working for British Canoe Union World Class from Nottingham as a Performance Canoe Coach he's had numerous successes with C2 and C1 paddlers, most significantly as the personal coach to David Florence, Silver Beijing Olympic Games 2008.

== World Cup individual podiums ==
Season	Date	Venue	Position	Event
1995	2 Jul 1995	Tacen	3rd	C1

== Personal life ==
At the 1992 Olympics, he was a welder. He comes from Broxburn, on Cardross Crescent. He married September in 1991.

In 1993 he lived at 16 Harthill Road, Blackridge.
