= Matthew Pallister =

Australian canoeist

Matthew John Pallister (born 31 January 1969 in Camperdown Hospital, Sydney) is an Australian slalom canoeist who competed from the mid-1980s to the late 2000s. He finished 16th in the C-2 event at the 1992 Summer Olympics in Barcelona. Four years later in Atlanta, Pallister finished 38th in the K-1 event.
