= Kara Weld =

American slalom kayaker

Medal record

Women's canoe slalom

Representing United States

World Championships
Bronze medal – third place	1991 Tacen	K1 team

Kara Weld is an American slalom canoeist who competed from the mid-1980s to the late 1990s. She won a bronze medal in the K1 team event at the 1991 ICF Canoe Slalom World Championships in Tacen. She is the co-owner of the company Immersion Research.
