= Vitus Husek =

German canoeist

Medal record

Men's canoe slalom

Representing West Germany

Junior World Championships
Bronze medal – third place	1990 Tavanasa	C1 team

Representing Germany

World Championships
Gold medal – first place	1995 Nottingham	C1 team

European Championships
Gold medal – first place	1996 Augsburg	C1 team

Vitus Husek (later known as Vitus Gesser, born 2 February 1973 in Augsburg) is a German slalom canoeist who competed at the international level from 1990 to 2000.

He won a gold medal in the C1 team event at the 1995 ICF Canoe Slalom World Championships in Nottingham and at the 1996 European Championships in Augsburg. Husek also finished 12th in the C1 event at the 1996 Summer Olympics in Atlanta.

== World Cup individual podiums ==
Season	Date	Venue	Position	Event
1995	25 Jun 1995	Prague	3rd	C1
