= 1997 ICF Canoe Slalom World Championships =

Canoe slalom event in Três Coroas, Brazil

The 1997 ICF Canoe Slalom World Championships were held in Três Coroas, Brazil under the auspices of International Canoe Federation. It was the 25th edition. It was the first time the championships were held in South America.

== Medal summary ==
=== Men's ===
==== Canoe ====
Event	Gold	Points	Silver	Points	Bronze	Points
C1	Michal Martikán (SVK)	267.61	Lukáš Pollert (CZE)	270.99	Gareth Marriott (GBR)	271.36
C1 team	Slovakia; Michal Martikán; Juraj Minčík; Juraj Ontko	151.63	France; Patrice Estanguet; Tony Estanguet; Yves Narduzzi	152.42	Slovenia; Simon Hočevar; Gregor Terdič; Sebastjan Linke	154.01
C2	France; Frank Adisson; Wilfrid Forgues	289.43	Germany; Michael Senft; André Ehrenberg	290.47	Czech Republic; Jiří Rohan; Miroslav Šimek	290.64
C2 team	France; Frank Adisson & Wilfrid Forgues; Emmanuel del Rey & Thierry Saidi; Éric Biau & Bertrand Daille	163.27	Czech Republic; Jiří Rohan & Miroslav Šimek; Petr Štercl & Pavel Štercl; Marek Jiras & Tomáš Máder	164.32	Germany; Michael Trummer & Manfred Berro; André Ehrenberg & Michael Senft; Kay Simon & Robby Simon	166.04

==== Kayak ====
Event	Gold	Points	Silver	Points	Bronze	Points
K1	Thomas Becker (GER)	254.60	Scott Shipley (USA)	255.23	Paul Ratcliffe (GBR)	255.64
K1 team	United Kingdom; Paul Ratcliffe; Ian Raspin; Shaun Pearce	141.35	France; Vincent Fondeviole; Jean-Michel Regnier; Ludovic Boulesteix	142.47	Germany; Thomas Becker; Jochen Lettmann; Holger Häffner	143.97

=== Women's ===
==== Kayak ====
Event	Gold	Points	Silver	Points	Bronze	Points
K1	Brigitte Guibal (FRA)	288.07	Štěpánka Hilgertová (CZE)	289.79	Cathy Hearn (USA)	290.38
K1 team	Germany; Evi Huss; Kordula Striepecke; Mandy Planert	163.79	France; Anouk Loubie; Anne Boixel; Brigitte Guibal	164.45	United Kingdom; Rachel Crosbee; Lynn Simpson; Heather Corrie	166.97

== Medals table ==
Rank	Nation	Gold	Silver	Bronze	Total
1	France (FRA)	3	3	0	6
2	Germany (GER)	2	1	2	5
3	Slovakia (SVK)	2	0	0	2
4	Great Britain (GBR)	1	0	3	4
5	Czech Republic (CZE)	0	3	1	4
6	United States (USA)	0	1	1	2
7	Slovenia (SLO)	0	0	1	1
Totals (7 entries)		8	8	8	24
