= Jana Freeburn =

American canoeist

Medal record

Women's canoe slalom

Representing United States

World Championships
Silver medal – second place	1993 Mezzana	K-1 team

Jana Freeburn (born Jana Babková) is a Czechoslovak-born American slalom canoeist who competed from the mid-1980s to the mid-1990s. She won a silver medal in the K-1 team event at the 1993 ICF Canoe Slalom World Championships in Mezzana.
