= Maria Francis =

British and Welsh slalom canoeist (born 1969)

Medal record

Women's canoe slalom

Representing Great Britain

World Championships
Bronze medal – third place	1993 Mezzana	K1 team

Maria Francis (Lund) (born 1969) is a British and Welsh slalom canoeist who competed in the 1980s and 1990s. She was women's K1 British Champion in 1989, silver medalist at the 1990 Europa Cup in Merano and went on to win a bronze medal in the K1 team event at the 1993 ICF Canoe Slalom World Championships in Mezzana.
