= Adam Clawson =

American canoeist

Medal record

Men's Canoe slalom

Representing United States

World Championships
Gold medal – first place	1991 Tacen	C1 team
Silver medal – second place	1991 Tacen	C1

Junior World Championships
Bronze medal – third place	1988 La Seu d'Urgell	C1
Bronze medal – third place	1990 Tavanasa	C1

Adam Clawson (28 December 1972 – 10 July 2017) was an American slalom canoeist who competed at the international level from 1988 to 1996.

He won two medals at the 1991 ICF Canoe Slalom World Championships in Tacen with a gold in the C1 team event and a silver in the C1 event.

Clawson also competed in two Summer Olympics, earning his best finish of 19th in the C1 event in Atlanta in 1996.

Clawson was born in Salt Lake City. He died in Whittier, North Carolina.

== World Cup individual podiums ==
Season	Date	Venue	Position	Event
1996	29 Sep 1996	Três Coroas	1st	C1
