= Matt Taylor (canoeist) =

American canoeist

Matthew McLeod "Matt" Taylor (born 23 April 1970 in Atlanta) is an American slalom canoeist who competed from the mid-1990s to the mid-2000s. Competing in two Summer Olympics, he earned his best finish of eighth in the C-2 event in Athens in 2004.

During his career in C2 he was partnered by several different paddlers including Lecky Haller (1997-2000) and Joe Jacobi (2002-2004).

== World Cup individual podiums ==
| Season | Date | Venue | Position | Event |
|---|---|---|---|---|
| 1998 | 2 Aug 1998 | Wausau | 3rd | C2 |
