= Holger Häffner =

German canoeist (born 1901)

Medal record

Men's canoe slalom

Representing Germany

World Championships
Bronze medal – third place	1997 Três Coroas	K-1 team

Holger Häffner is a German slalom canoeist who competed in the late 1990s. He won a bronze medal in the K-1 team event at the 1997 ICF Canoe Slalom World Championships in Três Coroas.
