= Yves Narduzzi =

French canoeist

Medal record

Men's canoe slalom

Representing France

World Championships
Silver medal – second place	1997 Três Coroas	C1 team

Yves Narduzzi (born 1969) is a French slalom canoeist who competed from the mid-1980s to the late 1990s. He won a silver medal in the C1 team event at the 1997 ICF Canoe Slalom World Championships in Três Coroas.

== World Cup individual podiums ==
Season	Date	Venue	Position	Event
1996	25 Aug 1996	Prague	3rd	C1
1997	29 Jun 1997	Björbo	3rd	C1
