= Michael Glöckle =

German slalom canoeist

Medal record

Men's canoe slalom

Representing Germany

World Championships
Silver medal – second place	1991 Tacen	K-1 team

Michael Glöckle is a German slalom canoeist who competed in the late 1980s and early 1990s. He won a silver medal in the K-1 team event at the 1991 ICF Canoe Slalom World Championships in Tacen.
