= Zlatko Sedlar =

Croatian canoeist

Medal record

Men's canoe slalom

Representing Croatia

World Championships
Silver medal – second place	1995 Nottingham	C-1 team

Zlatko Sedlar (born 7 March 1972) is a Croatian slalom canoeist who competed from the mid-1990s to the early 2000s. He won a silver medal in the C-1 team event at the 1995 ICF Canoe Slalom World Championships in Nottingham.
