= Manuel Brissaud =

French slalom canoeist

Medal record

Men's canoe slalom

Representing France

World Championships
Gold medal – first place	1991 Tacen	K-1 team
Silver medal – second place	1985 Augsburg	K-1 team
Silver medal – second place	1993 Mezzana	K-1 team
Bronze medal – third place	1987 Bourg St.-Maurice	K-1 team

Manuel Brissaud is a French slalom canoeist who competed in the 1980s and 1990s. He won four medals in the K-1 team event at the ICF Canoe Slalom World Championships with a gold (1991), two silvers (1985, 1993) and a bronze (1987).
