= Sheryl Boyle =

Canadian slalom canoeist

Dr. Sheryl Boyle (born November 13, 1965, in Renfrew, Ontario) is an Associate Professor at Carleton University at the Azrieli School of Architecture & Urbanism. She is director of the Carleton Sensory Architecture & Liminal Technology lab (CSALT) where she conducts research on technological innovation with materials and innovative Design for Manufacturing and Assembly (DFMA) approaches. Dr. Boyle is the lead author on a new book, Sense-Making: New Sensory Methods for Exploring the Past and Imagining Possible Futures, published in 2025 by Routledge.

She is also an Olympian. Dr. Boyle is a Canadian slalom canoeist who competed from the late 1980s to the late 1990s. Competing in two Summer Olympics, she earned her best finish of 22nd in the K1 event in Barcelona in 1992.

== World Cup individual podiums ==
| Season | Date | Venue | Position | Event |
|---|---|---|---|---|
| 1992 | 31 May 1992 | Nottingham | 2nd | K1 |
| 1993 | 18 Jul 1993 | La Seu d'Urgell | 3rd | K1 |
