= Sebastjan Linke =

Slovenian slalom canoeist

Medal record

Men's canoe slalom

Representing Slovenia

World Championships
Bronze medal – third place	1997 Três Coroas	C-1 team

European Championships
Bronze medal – third place	1996 Augsburg	C-1 team

Sebastjan Linke is a Slovenian slalom canoeist who competed from the mid-1990s to the mid-2000s. He won a bronze medal in the C-1 team event at the 1997 ICF Canoe Slalom World Championships in Três Coroas and at the 1996 European Championships in Augsburg.
