= Martin McCormick =

American canoeist

Martin Edward "Marty" McCormick (born June 19, 1964 in Cleveland) is an American slalom canoeist who competed from the mid-1980s to the mid-1990s. He finished 15th in the C2 event at the 1992 Summer Olympics in Barcelona.

He started off his career as a K1 paddler, but later started competing in C2 together with Elliot Weintrob.

== World Cup individual podiums ==
Season	Date	Venue	Position	Event
1993	21 Aug 1993	Minden	3rd	C2
