= Bill Horsman (canoeist) =

British slalom canoeist

Medal record

Men's canoe slalom

Representing Great Britain

World Championships
Silver medal – second place	1993 Mezzana	C-1 team
Bronze medal – third place	1991 Tacen	C-1 team

Bill Horsman is a British slalom canoeist who competed from the late 1980s to the mid-1990s. He won two medals in the C-1 team event at the ICF Canoe Slalom World Championships with a silver in 1993 and a bronze in 1991.
