= Zdenka Grossmannová =

Czechoslovak-Czech slalom canoeist (born 1965)

Medal record

Women's canoe slalom

Representing Czechoslovakia

World Championships
Silver medal – second place	1991 Tacen	K1 team
Bronze medal – third place	1989 Savage River	K1 team

Zdenka Grossmannová (born 17 November 1965 in Jindřichův Hradec) is a Czech slalom canoeist. She competed for Czechoslovakia and the Czech Republic from the early 1980s to the mid-1990s. She won two medals in the K1 team event at the ICF Canoe Slalom World Championships with a silver in 1991 and a bronze in 1989.

Grossmanová also finished seventh in the K1 event at the 1992 Summer Olympics in Barcelona.

== World Cup individual podiums ==
Season	Date	Venue	Position	Event
1988	19 June 1988	Wausau	1st	K1
1989	15 Aug 1989	Augsburg	1st	K1
1989	20 Aug 1989	Tacen	2nd	K1
1990	25 Aug 1990	Tacen	1st	K1
1992	16 Feb 1992	Murupara	2nd	K1
1992	7 Jun 1992	Merano	2nd	K1
1992	20 Jun 1992	Bourg St.-Maurice	3rd	K1
