= Elliot Weintrob =

American canoeist

Elliot Weintrob (born March 2, 1965, in Washington, D.C.) is an American slalom canoeist who competed in the early-to-mid 1990s in the C2 class together with Martin McCormick. He finished 15th in the C2 event at the 1992 Summer Olympics in Barcelona.

== World Cup individual podiums ==
Season	Date	Venue	Position	Event
1993	21 Aug 1993	Minden	3rd	C2
