= Lofer =

- Municipality
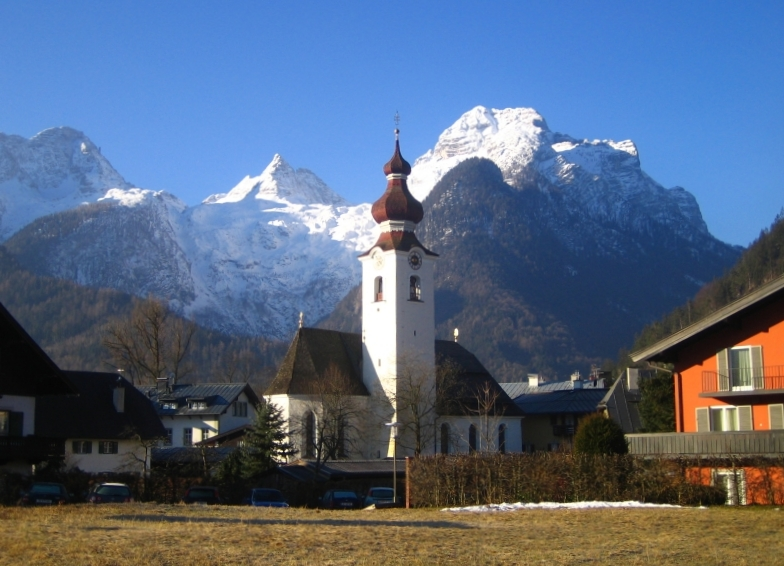
- Parish church

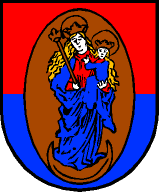
- Coat of arms

- Location within Austria
- Coordinates: 47°35′09″N 12°41′37″E
- Country: Austria
- State: Salzburg
- District: Zell am See

Government
  - Mayor: Norbert Meindl (ÖVP)

Area
  - Total: 55.64 km^{2} (21.48 sq mi)
- Elevation: 626 m (2,054 ft)

Population (2018-01-01)
  - Total: 2,037
  - Density: 36.61/km^{2} (94.82/sq mi)
- Time zone: UTC+1 (CET)
  - Summer (DST): UTC+2 (CEST)
- Postal code: 5090
- Area code: 06588
- Vehicle registration: ZE
- Website: www.lofer.salzburg.at

Lofer (German pronunciation: [ˈloːfɐ]) is a market town in the district of Zell am See in the Austrian state of Salzburg.

== Geography ==
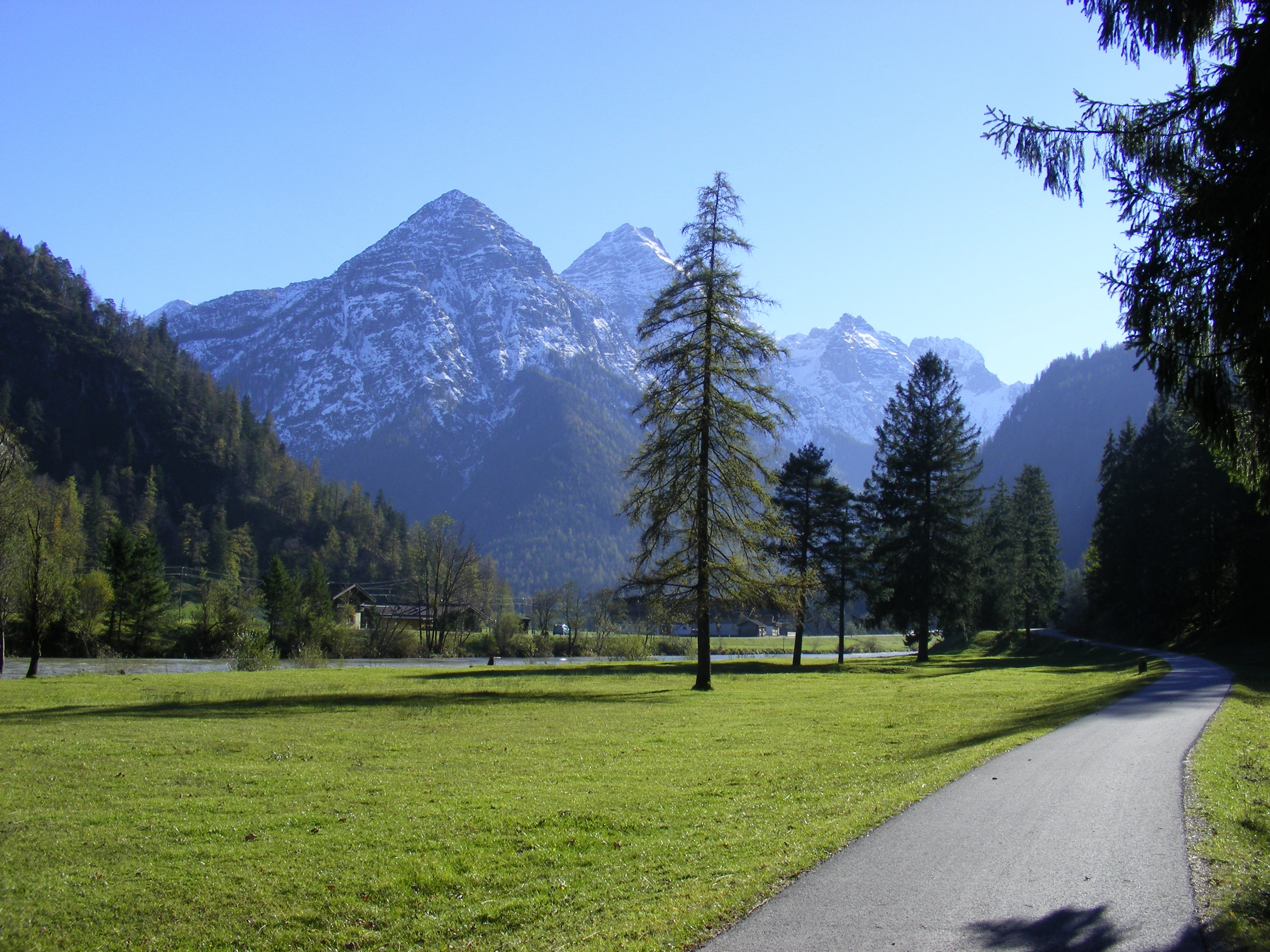
Saalach valley

Lofer is located in the historic Pinzgau region, in the valley of the Saalach river between the Chiemgau Alps and Reiter Alpe in the north and east, and the Lofer Mountains in the southwest. In the west, the road leads to the municipality of Waidring in Tyrol, while in the north the Kleines Deutsches Eck highway connection, part of the European route E641, runs along the Saalach river to the southwestern outskirts of Salzburg via neighbouring Unken and over the border with Germany.

The municipal area comprises the cadastral communities of Au, Hallenstein, Lofer, and Scheffsnoth.

== History ==
Due to its location on the road to Tyrol, Lofer was an important post station. Its citizens were vested with market rights by the Prince-Bishops of Salzburg in 1473. The present-day parish church was erected around 1500.

The border with Tyrol at Strub Pass in the west was the site of several fortifications erected from the 13th century onwards. During the Napoleonic War of the Third Coalition in 1805, Austrian troops fought here against the French invaders. During the Tyrolean Rebellion four years later, Bavarian troops stormed the fortress, which soon after was demolished.

== Population ==
Historical population
| Year | Pop. | ±% |
|---|---|---|
| 1869 | 777 | — |
| 1880 | 821 | +5.7% |
| 1890 | 906 | +10.4% |
| 1900 | 944 | +4.2% |
| 1910 | 1,014 | +7.4% |
| 1923 | 985 | −2.9% |
| 1934 | 1,053 | +6.9% |
| 1939 | 1,135 | +7.8% |
| 1951 | 1,438 | +26.7% |
| 1961 | 1,519 | +5.6% |
| 1971 | 1,687 | +11.1% |
| 1981 | 1,690 | +0.2% |
| 1991 | 1,855 | +9.8% |
| 2001 | 1,943 | +4.7% |
| 2011 | 1,922 | −1.1% |

== Economy ==
The local businesses are mainly agriculture and tourism. The Saalach river running through the town it is a popular white water destination during the summer, and in the winter months its newly extended 58 km of groomed ski runs attract many family oriented ski parties. The season is late December - early March. 37 km away is the large resort of Kitzbühel.

== Politics ==
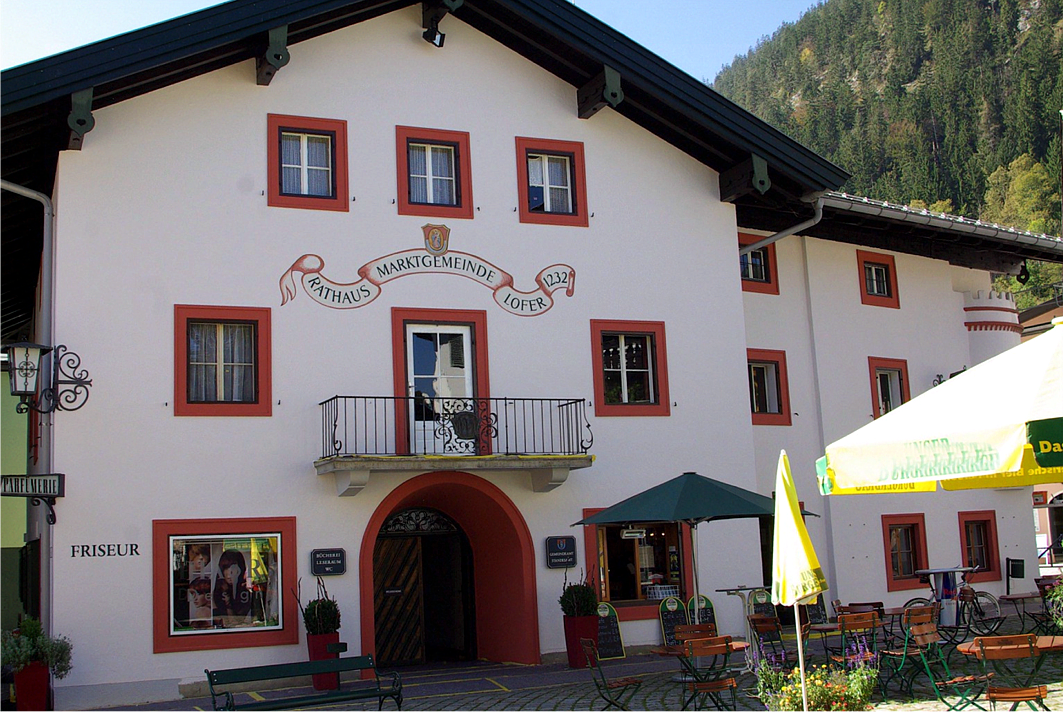
Town hall

Seats in the municipal assembly (Gemeiderat) as of 2014 local elections:

- Austrian People's Party (ÖVP): 10
- Freedom Party of Austria (FPÖ): 5
- Social Democratic Party of Austria (SPÖ): 2

== Media ==
Parts of the film Where Eagles Dare (1968) were filmed in Lofer.
