= Ocoee Whitewater Center =

Sports venue in Tennessee, United States

About
- Locale: Ducktown, Tennessee, United States
- Managing agent: U S Forest Service
- Designer: McLaughlin Whitewater Design Group
- Main shape: Riverbed
- Water source: Ocoee River Dam release
- Surf wave: Yes
- Canoe lift: No
- Facilities: Yes, limited due to fire
- Construction: 1993-95
- Opening date: 1996

Stats
- Length: 1,640 feet (500 m)
- Drop: 37 feet (11 m)
- Slope: 2.2% (120 ft/mile)
- Flowrate: 1,400 cu ft/s (40 m^{3}/s) to 1,600 cu ft/s (45 m^{3}/s)

The Ocoee Whitewater Center, near Ducktown, Tennessee, United States, was the canoe slalom venue for the 1996 Summer Olympics in Atlanta, and it is the only in-river course to be used for Olympic slalom competition. A 1,640-foot (500 m) stretch of the Upper Ocoee River was narrowed by two-thirds to create the drops and eddies needed for a slalom course. Today, the course is watered only on summer weekends, 34 days a year, for use by guided rafts and private boaters. When the river has water, 24 commercial rafting companies take more than 750 raft passengers through the course each day.

Because the river is dry most of the year, the Center, now operated by the U.S. Forest Service, also serves as a site for hiking, mountain biking, conferences, weddings, and receptions. It receives about 300,000 visitors a year.

The Ocoee Whitewater Center visitor center was destroyed by a fire early on the morning of April 26, 2022, and the main structure was completely destroyed. As of June 2023, investigators hadn't determined the cause of the fire. On May 27, 2023, a little over a year after the fire, the day use area of the Center opened to the public, and the U.S. Forest Service sought public input for developing a masterplan for the Center.

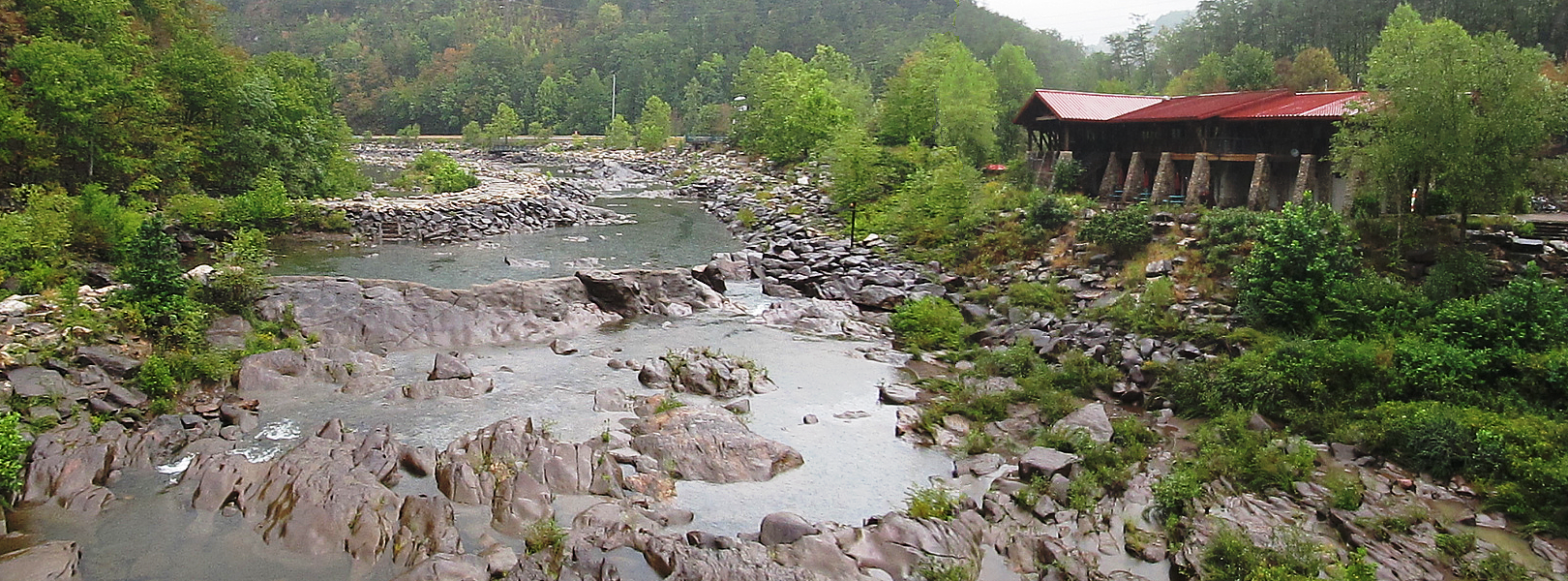
Ocoee Whitewater Center from pedestrian bridge, altered riverbed without water. "Best ledge" crosses the river in the middle of the picture.

== Design and construction ==
Map of Ocoee River altered riverbed used as the canoe slalom venue for the 1996 Olympic Games.

Since most Olympic host cities are located far from usable whitewater, canoe slalom is a relatively recent addition to the Olympic games. The first two Olympic canoe slalom venues were canals built around dams on small rivers in nearby mountains: Augsburg Eiskanal for the 1972 Munich Games, and Segre Olympic Park for the 1992 Barcelona Games. The 1996 Atlanta Games produced the third such venue by modifying the then-dry streambed of the Upper Ocoee River. As the only in-river Olympic venue, it had the greatest water volume, the highest drop, and the steepest slope. The more recent Olympic venues, built closer to their host cities, rely entirely on pumped water and use smaller concrete channels designed to minimize the energy cost of running the pumps.

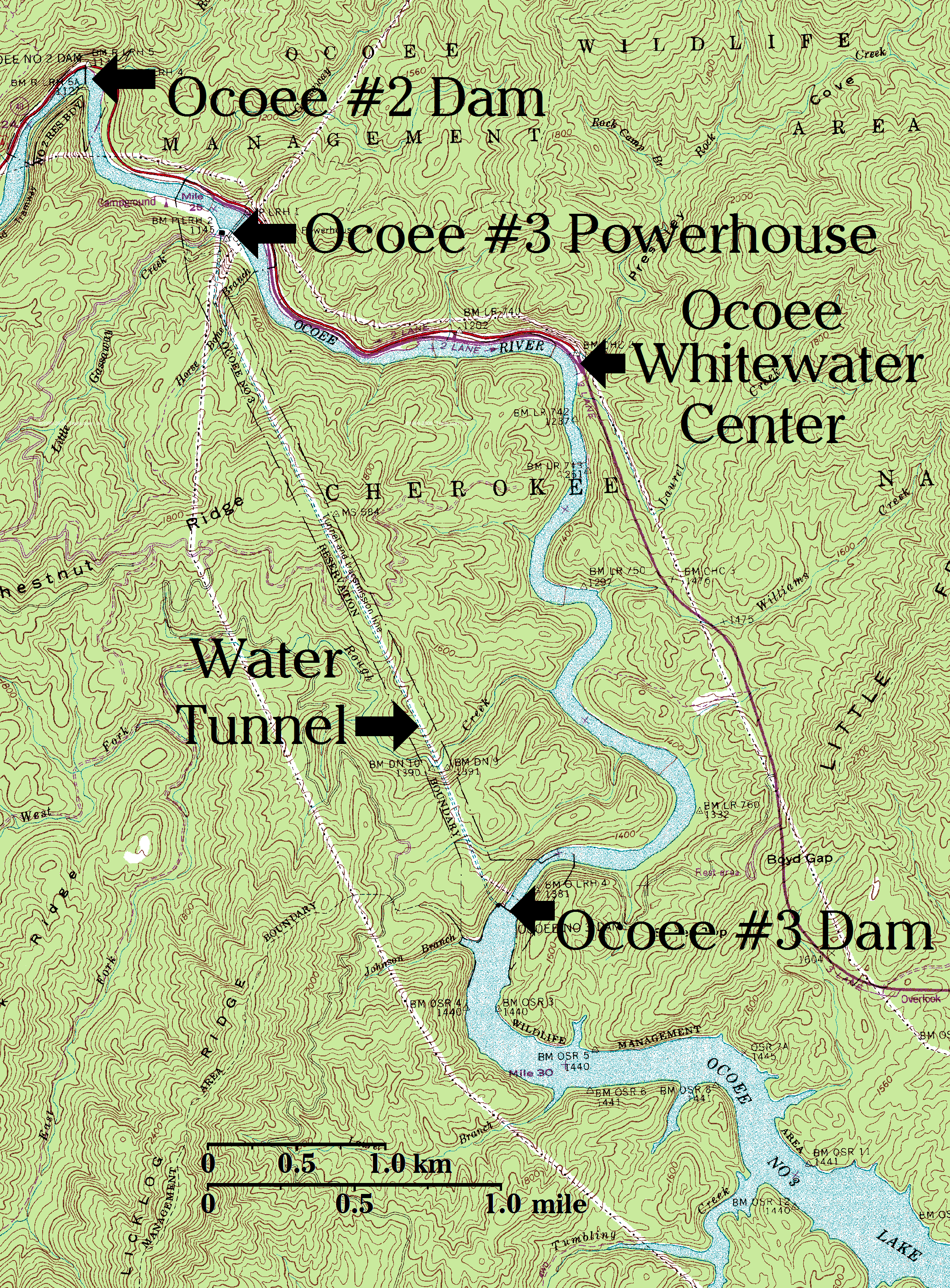
Upper Ocoee River Topographical Map.

Levees built along the shore of the Ocoee River, and covered with natural rock, reduced its width from 200 feet (61 m) to 70 feet (21 m), which is still twice the width of most artificial whitewater channels. Even at this reduced width, for the water surface to have the desired dynamics the streamflow needed to be 1,400 cu ft/s (40 m^{3}/s), which is two or three times greater than the flow of most artificial whitewater channels. The proposed river modifications were tested on a 1-to-10 scale model, with water, constructed outdoors near the base of Ocoee Dam #1, at 35.0967°N 84.652°W.

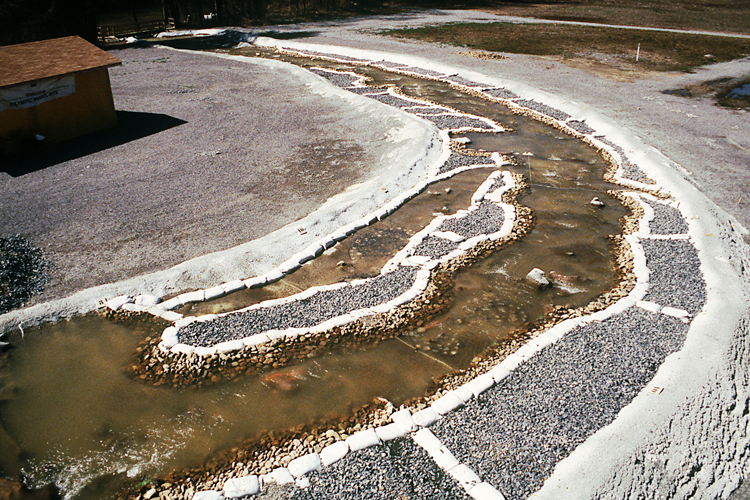
Scale model, 1:10, built to study proposed narrowing of the Upper Ocoee River for the 1996 Olympic games.

Despite the fact that the Ocoee is watered by rainfall and gravity, the energy cost of putting water in the river is high in terms of sacrificed electricity production. The Upper Ocoee, the 3.5 mi (5.6 km) section of the river between Dam #3 and its powerhouse, is normally dewatered except during flood control releases, usually during the winter and spring. Lake water is taken by tunnel and penstock, at the rate of 1,050 cu ft/s (30 m^{3}/s), to the power house 300 feet (91 m) lower than the lake surface. This water flow and vertical drop generate 23 megawatts of electricity. Any water in the river must come directly from the dam and bypass the power house. The Olympic Games dam release of 1,400 cu ft/s (40 m^{3}/s) represented an electricity sacrifice of 31 megawatts, and today's recreational releases of 1,600 cu ft/s (45 m^{3}/s) represent an electricity sacrifice of 35 megawatts, or $2100/hour at 6¢/kilowatt-hour.

The popular rafting industry generates enough revenue to partially compensate the Tennessee Valley Authority for lost electricity, but slalom athletes need a cheaper place to practice. In 2006, the U.S. National Whitewater Center was built in Charlotte, North Carolina, with an Olympic-standard whitewater course watered by three half-megawatt pumps.

The Media and VIP building for the whitewater events was designed by TWH Architects of Chattanooga, Tennessee. The building now contains a visitors center and gift shop.

== Olympic Course ==

For the final slalom race of the 1996 Olympic games, there were 25 gates, 6 upstream (red) and 19 downstream (green). The 500 meter course was twice the length of the Lee Valley course used in the 2012 London Olympics, but with a similar number of gates. At Ocoee, racers had to sprint between the widely separated gates at the top and then maneuver through the closely spaced gates around the Humongous rapid at the bottom.

The named rapids are Best Ledge, the drop above Olympic gate #1; Smiley’s, where a midstream boulder splits the stream below gate #3; Slam Dunk, the ledge between gates #8 and #9; the Conveyor Belt wave train, gates #10 - #17; Callihan Ledge at gate #18; and Humongous, gates #21 - #24.

Humongous is the steepest and most constricted rapid, with a wave train on the left side of a midstream boulder and two big drops on the right side, Godzilla and Humongous Hole. Olympic upstream gate #23 was placed on the right bank in the small eddy between the two drops. To avoid getting stuck in Humongous Hole and missing the rest of the gates, slalom racers needed to catch the Godzilla wave to stop their downstream momentum when entering the eddy, and catch it again to surf across the current toward the boulder and upstream gate #24.

Commercial rafts often go down the right side at Humongous for the two-drop roller coaster ride, sometimes flipping and dumping their occupants in the water at the second drop.

The course was scheduled to host the ICF Canoe Slalom World Championships in 2001, but those were cancelled in the wake of the September 11, 2001 attacks.

== Ocoee whitewater rafting ==
Whitewater rafting on the Middle Ocoee, downstream from the Whitewater Center, first became a thriving industry in 1976, when the wooden flume between Dam #2 and its powerhouse was shut down for renovation. The power generation system for Dam #2 is similar to that for Dam #3. In both cases water is drained from the lake behind the dam and transported with little loss in elevation to a penstock and powerhouse several miles downstream. From Dam #2 the water travels through an above-ground wooden flume, rather than through a tunnel. In both cases, the riverbed between the dam and powerhouse, which drops about 250 feet (76 m) in elevation, is deprived of all the water used in power generation.

From 1913, when Dam #2 and its flume were completed, until 1976, when the flume was shut down for repair, the 4.5-mile (7.2 km) section of river below the flume was waterless most of the time, especially in summer. In 1976, the sudden appearance of water in the long-dry Middle Ocoee river attracted private canoers and kayakers and commercial rafting operators, who by 1983, when the flume was put back in service, had enough political clout and money to strike a deal with TVA for regular recreational releases during the summer months. Thirteen years later, when the 1996 Olympic Games came to the Upper Ocoee, recreational releases were scheduled for the upper section of the river as well.

According to a 13-year agreement now in force, the Upper Ocoee, below Dam #3 and flowing past the Whitewater Center, has mid-day water 34 days a year, on summer weekends. The Middle Ocoee, below Dam #2, has water 106 days a year and contains 26 Adventure Class rapids. On the days when the Upper Ocoee is also watered, the Middle Ocoee has water into the early evening (its own release plus the extra water from upstream). Most rafting activity takes place on the Middle Ocoee, which has a 1% slope of 50 ft/mile (9.5 m/km). Rafting down the Upper Ocoee, and through the steeper Olympic course, is offered as a more challenging alternative.

Whenever the Ocoee River has water, private boaters are free to use the river without charge.

A large fire destroyed the Ocoee Whitwater Center's main building in the early morning hours of April 26, 2022.

== Hiking, biking, and camping ==
The Tanasi Trail System Mountain Bike Trail offers 30 miles (48 km) of trails centered on the Whitewater Center. The Thunder Rock Campground is located at Powerhouse #3, one mile (1.6 km) west (downstream) of the Center. The Ocoee Scenic Byway (U.S. 64) provides access to the center and is usually open year-round. The westbound lanes of the road were originally constructed as the parking and staging area for the Olympics, later allowing it to become a divided highway at this point to handle summertime traffic.

== Gallery ==
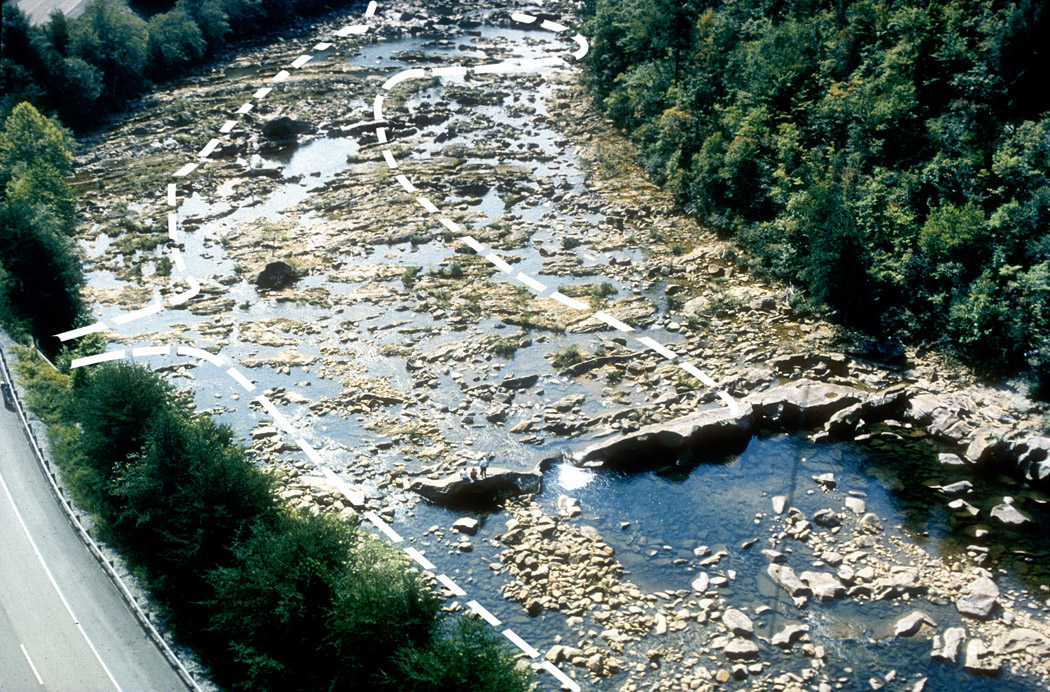
Riverbed before construction, with lines showing proposed new shorelines.

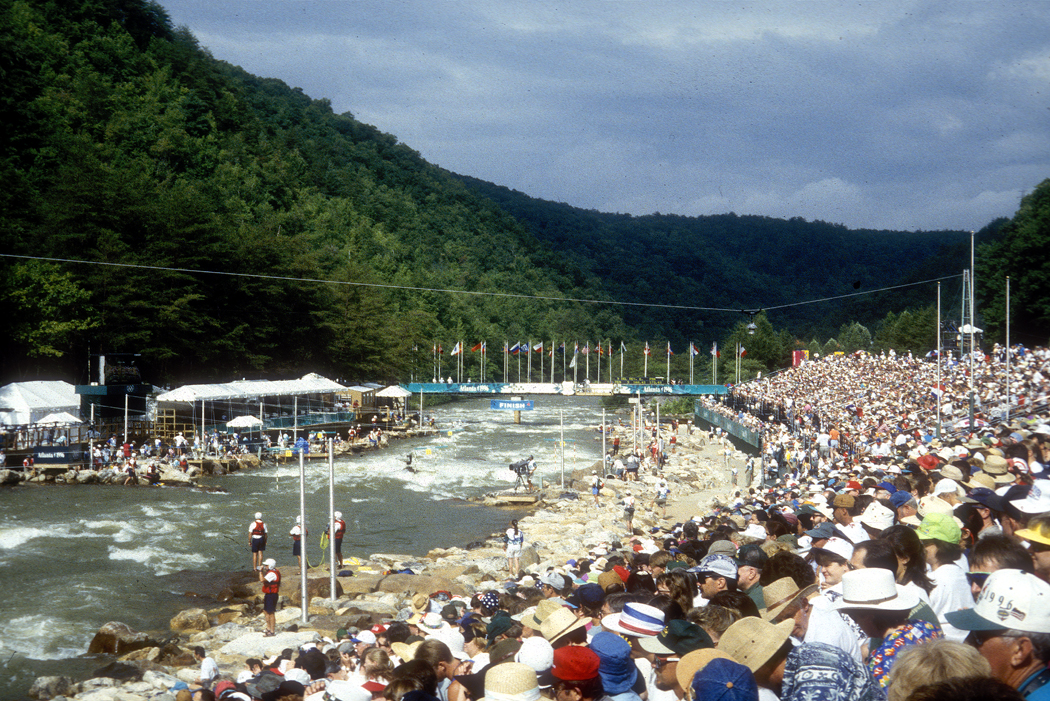
Finish line for 1996 Olympics. Midstream camera is mounted on the boulder in Humongous Rapid.

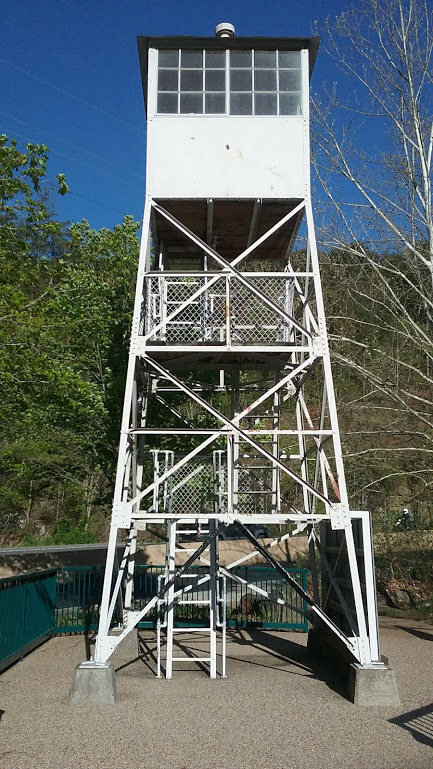
Fire tower at the museum formerly located on Oswald Dome. This tower was moved to its current location in 2004.
