= Mezzana, Trentino =

Mezzana
- Comune
- Comune di Mezzana
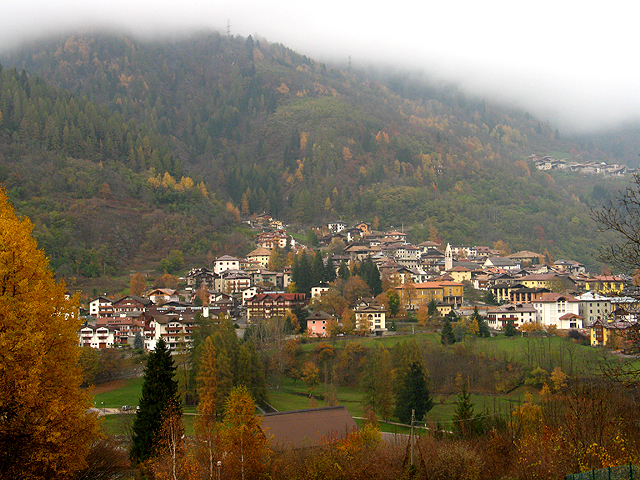

- Coat of arms

- Location within Italy Location within Trentino-Alto Adige/Südtirol
- Coordinates: 46°19′N 10°48′E
- Country: Italy
- Region: Trentino-Alto Adige/Südtirol
- Province: Trentino (TN)
- Frazioni: Marilleva, Menàs, Ortisé, Roncio

Government
  - Mayor: Giacomo Redolfi

Area
  - Total: 27.3 km^{2} (10.5 sq mi)
- Elevation: 947 m (3,107 ft)

Population (2026)
  - Total: 883
  - Density: 32.3/km^{2} (83.8/sq mi)
- Time zone: UTC+1 (CET)
  - Summer (DST): UTC+2 (CEST)
- Postal code: 38020
- Dialing code: 0463
- Website: Official website

Mezzana (Solandro: Mezanå) is a comune (municipality) in Trentino in the northern Italian region Trentino-Alto Adige/Südtirol, located about 35 kilometres (22 mi) northwest of Trento.
