= Nantahala Outdoor Center =

River outfitter in western North Carolina

Coordinates: 35.3312°N 83.5918°W

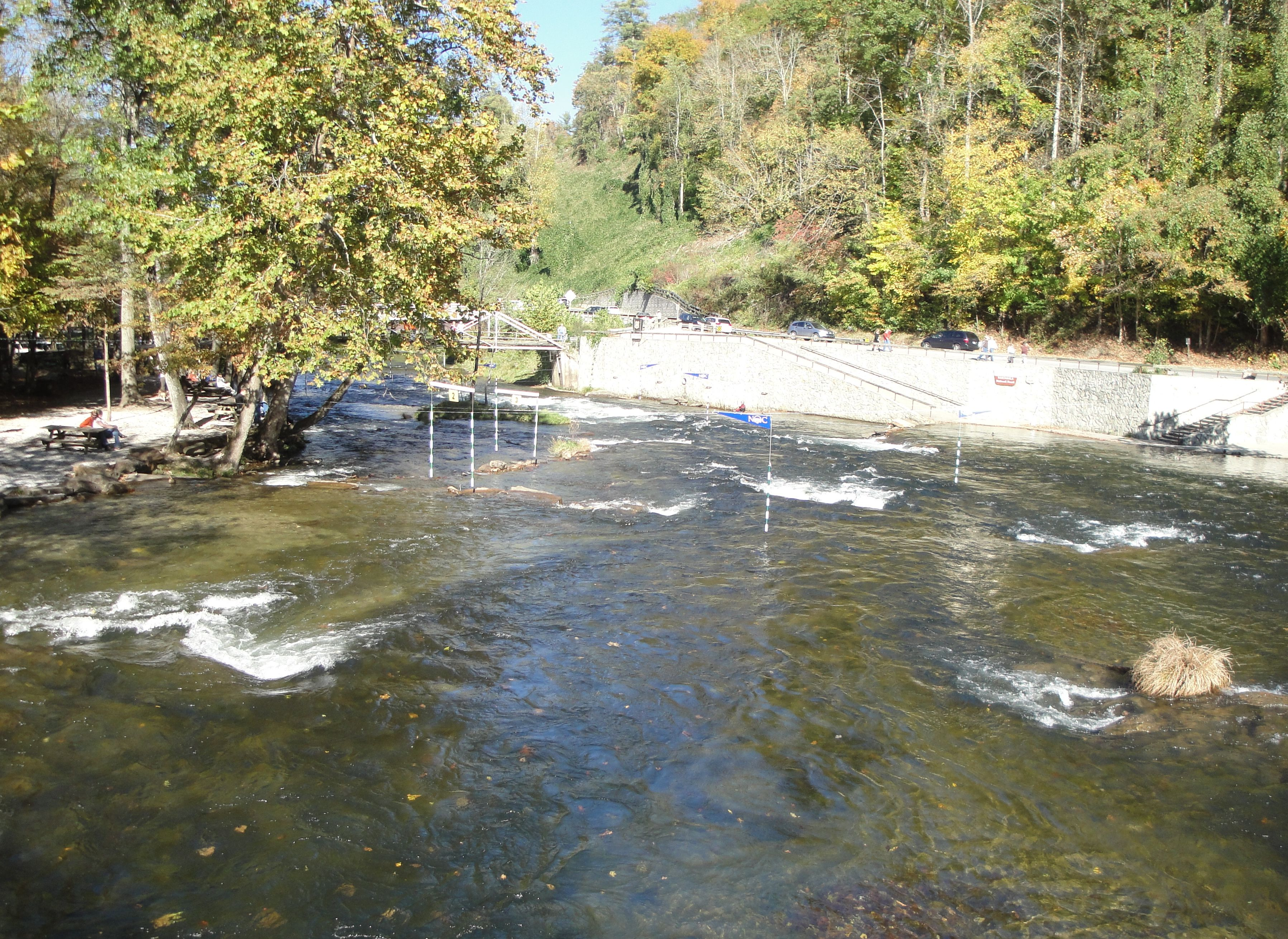
Nantahala Outdoor Center

Nantahala Outdoor Center (NOC) is a commercial outdoor guide service and retail store located at 13077 Highway 19 West, Bryson City, NC 28713. It opened in 1972 when Payson, Aurelia Kennedy, and Horace Holden Sr. took over the old Tote 'N Tarry Motel. NOC is based in western North Carolina near Bryson City, near the Great Smoky Mountains on the Nantahala River. Nantahala National Forest surround the service. The Appalachian Trail crosses the Nantahala River on a bridge next to the outfitter. NOC offers whitewater rafting, ziplining, guided hiking, and mountain biking in the Southeastern United States.

== History ==
NOC was founded in 1972 by Payson Kennedy. In 1990, the company became 100% worker-owned, with the assistance of a $400,000 loan from a subsidiary of the Center for Community Self-Help.

== Activities ==
NOC operates whitewater rafting trips on six Southeastern rivers: the Chattahoochee, Chattooga, French Broad, Nantahala, Ocoee, and Pigeon. NOC offers paddling trips down each of these rivers. NOC offers tubing trips down the Chattahoochee River. NOC collaborates with government and environmental organizations, including the United States Forest Service, on river and land conservation efforts.

NOC also teaches people to paddle in its canoe and kayak paddling school and also offers mountain bike rentals, ziplining, group programs, ropes courses, kayak touring, and guided hiking at the flagship Bryson City location. NOC offers a variety of outdoor education courses to the public. In addition to their different paddling classes, NOC also offers wilderness medicine and swiftwater rescue courses. The wilderness medicine course offerings include wilderness first aid, wilderness first responder, wilderness EMT, and a course for healthcare professionals. All participants of their wilderness medicine classes can receive certification through SOLO Southeast, leaders in wilderness medicine training.

== Lodging and Dining ==
In addition to outdoor adventure and education, NOC offers various lodging options year-round. Lodging options include the Hemlocks Mountain Bungalows, Trailside Cabins, the Dogwood Motel, and Basecamp, a hostel-style facility.

On-site dining options include the River's End Restaurant, Big Wesser Riverside Pub, and Slow Joe's Donut Bus.

== International Presence ==
From 2022, NOC started offering international trips with a wide variety of excursions to choose from at each location. Some of the locations include British Columbia, Argentina, Iceland, and Africa. They include a variety of trips to accommodate for different ages and experience levels. Destinations for these international excursions include Mount Kilimanjaro, Machu Picchu, and Iceland.

Former NOC president John Burton (who, until recently, was an owner/operator of nearby Nantahala Village Resort) was a member of the original 1972 Olympic slalom team. His teammate Angus Morrison, currently a head guide for Nantahala River Guided Trips, was also on the Olympic team that year, as well as in 1976 and 1980. More recently, Olympians Lecky and Fritz Haller, Horace Holden Jr., Wayne Dickert (currently head of NOC Instruction), Joe Jacobi, Scott Strausbaugh and Scott Shipley have all trained with the Nantahala Racing Club at NOC on the Nantahala River. Bryson City native Adam Clawson is a two-time U.S. Olympian and a 1991 World Championship silver medalist.

Jacobi and Strausbaugh, paddling C-2, are the only Americans ever to have won an Olympic gold medal for the US in whitewater, which they did in Barcelona in 1992. NOC remains a training site for whitewater athletes in the US. Paddlers have come from all over to experience the Nantahala river and the NOC alike.
