= 1992 Canoe Slalom World Cup =

The 1992 Canoe Slalom World Cup was a series of five races in 4 canoeing and kayaking categories organized by the International Canoe Federation (ICF). It was the 5th edition. The series consisted of 4 regular world cup races and the world cup final.

== Calendar ==
| Label | Venue | Date |
|---|---|---|
| World Cup Race 1 | (New Zealand) Murupara | 15–16 February |
| World Cup Race 2 | (Australia) Launceston | 22–23 February |
| World Cup Race 3 | (United Kingdom) Nottingham | 30–31 May |
| World Cup Race 4 | (Italy) Merano | 6–7 June |
| World Cup Final | (France) Bourg St.-Maurice | 19–20 June |

== Final standings ==
The winner of each world cup race was awarded 25 points. The points scale reached down to 1 point for 15th place. Only the best three results of each athlete counted for the final world cup standings. If two or more athletes or boats were equal on points, the ranking was determined by their positions in the world cup final.

=== C1 men ===
| Pos | Athlete | Points |
|---|---|---|
| 1 | Martin Lang (GER) | 60 |
| 2 | Gareth Marriott (GBR) | 50 |
| 3 | Lukáš Pollert (TCH) | 44 |
| 4 | Renato de Monti (ITA) | 43 |
| 5 | Juraj Ontko (TCH) | 43 |
| 6 | Danko Herceg (CRO) | 40 |
| 7 | Jakub Prüher (TCH) | 31 |
| 8 | Kent Ford (USA) | 25 |
| 8 | Andreas Kübler (GER) | 25 |
| 10 | Jacky Avril (FRA) | 23 |

=== C2 men ===
| Pos | Athletes | Points |
|---|---|---|
| 1 | Miroslav Šimek/Jiří Rohan (TCH) | 65 |
| 2 | Jan Petříček/Tomáš Petříček (TCH) | 55 |
| 3 | Petr Štercl/Pavel Štercl (TCH) | 49 |
| 4 | Ueli Matti/Peter Matti (SUI) | 39 |
| 5 | Viktor Beneš/Milan Kučera (TCH) | 36 |
| 6 | Lecky Haller/Jamie McEwan (USA) | 32 |
| 7 | Iain Clough/Andrew Clough (GBR) | 32 |
| 8 | Frank Hemmer/Thomas Loose (GER) | 32 |
| 9 | Krzysztof Kołomański/Michał Staniszewski (POL) | 27 |
| 10 | Matthew Pallister/Andrew Wilson (AUS) | 26 |

=== K1 men ===
| Pos | Athlete | Points |
|---|---|---|
| 1 | Pierpaolo Ferrazzi (ITA) | 52 |
| 2 | Luboš Hilgert (TCH) | 51 |
| 3 | Melvyn Jones (GBR) | 50 |
| 4 | Ian Raspin (GBR) | 45 |
| 5 | Richard Fox (GBR) | 41 |
| 6 | Pavel Přindiš (TCH) | 35 |
| 7 | Marjan Štrukelj (SLO) | 34 |
| 8 | Ian Wiley (IRL) | 33 |
| 9 | Frits Sins (NED) | 29 |
| 10 | David Ford (CAN) | 25 |
| 10 | Scott Shipley (USA) | 25 |

=== K1 women ===
| Pos | Athlete | Points |
|---|---|---|
| 1 | Štěpánka Hilgertová (TCH) | 56 |
| 2 | Zdenka Grossmannová (TCH) | 55 |
| 3 | Myriam Jerusalmi (FRA) | 52 |
| 4 | Marianne Agulhon (FRA) | 45 |
| 5 | Anne Boixel (FRA) | 40 |
| 6 | Danielle Woodward (AUS) | 36 |
| 7 | Elisabeth Micheler (GER) | 36 |
| 8 | Sheryl Boyle (CAN) | 31 |
| 9 | Lynn Simpson (GBR) | 28 |
| 10 | Marcela Sadilová (TCH) | 26 |

== Results ==
=== World Cup Race 1 ===
The first world cup race of the season took place in Murupara, New Zealand from 15 to 16 February.

| Event | Gold | Score | Silver | Score | Bronze | Score |
|---|---|---|---|---|---|---|
| C1 men | Andreas Kübler (GER) | 137.0 | Martin Lang (GER) | 141.3 | Kent Ford (USA) | 141.7 |
| C2 men | Czechoslovakia; Miroslav Šimek; Jiří Rohan | 149.2 | Czechoslovakia; Petr Štercl; Pavel Štercl | 152.5 | Czechoslovakia; Jan Petříček; Tomáš Petříček | 154.7 |
| K1 men | Luboš Hilgert (TCH) | | Michael Seibert (GER) | | Melvyn Jones (GBR) | |
| K1 women | Myriam Jerusalmi (FRA) | 152.8 | Zdenka Grossmannová (TCH) | 153.1 | Kordula Striepecke (GER) | 153.7 |

=== World Cup Race 2 ===
The second world cup race of the season took place in Launceston, Tasmania from 22 to 23 February.

| Event | Gold | Score | Silver | Score | Bronze | Score |
|---|---|---|---|---|---|---|
| C1 men | Lukáš Pollert (TCH) | 152.49 | Jakub Prüher (TCH) | 155.35 | Juraj Ontko (TCH) | 155.67 |
| C2 men | Czechoslovakia; Miroslav Šimek; Jiří Rohan | 159.26 | Czechoslovakia; Petr Štercl; Pavel Štercl | 167.34 | Czechoslovakia; Jan Petříček; Tomáš Petříček | 173.29 |
| K1 men | Melvyn Jones (GBR) | 139.43 | Richard Fox (GBR) | 140.43 | Luboš Hilgert (TCH) | 140.55 |
| K1 women | Elisabeth Micheler (GER) | 167.04 | Štěpánka Hilgertová (TCH) | 179.85 | Myriam Jerusalmi (FRA) | 180.60 |

=== World Cup Race 3 ===
The third world cup race of the season took place at the Holme Pierrepont National Watersports Centre in Nottingham from 30 to 31 May.

| Event | Gold | Score | Silver | Score | Bronze | Score |
|---|---|---|---|---|---|---|
| C1 men | Martin Lang (GER) | 136.75 | Renato de Monti (ITA) | 138.11 | Gareth Marriott (GBR) | 140.97 |
| C2 men | France; Frank Adisson; Wilfrid Forgues | 141.52 | Germany; Frank Hemmer; Thomas Loose | 152.93 | France; Éric Biau; Bertrand Daille | 153.36 |
| K1 men | Scott Shipley (USA) | 126.21 | Pierpaolo Ferrazzi (ITA) | 128.00 | Jochen Lettmann (GER) | 128.11 |
| K1 women | Marianne Agulhon (FRA) | 148.38 | Sheryl Boyle (CAN) | 148.42 | Anne Boixel (FRA) | 148.73 |

=== World Cup Race 4 ===
The fourth world cup race of the season took place in Merano, Italy from 6 to 7 June.

| Event | Gold | Score | Silver | Score | Bronze | Score |
|---|---|---|---|---|---|---|
| C1 men | Danko Herceg (CRO) | 168.92 | Juraj Ontko (TCH) | 170.50 | Martin Lang (GER) | 172.77 |
| C2 men | Czechoslovakia; Jan Petříček; Tomáš Petříček | 176.93 | Switzerland; Ueli Matti; Peter Matti | 179.42 | Czechoslovakia; Miroslav Šimek; Jiří Rohan | 180.71 |
| K1 men | David Ford (CAN) | 159.74 | Pierpaolo Ferrazzi (ITA) | 160.88 | Marjan Štrukelj (SLO) | 161.05 |
| K1 women | Štěpánka Hilgertová (TCH) | 184.28 | Zdenka Grossmannová (TCH) | 184.33 | Marcela Sadilová (TCH) | 184.85 |

=== World Cup Final ===
The final world cup race of the season took place in Bourg St.-Maurice, France from 19 to 20 June.

| Event | Gold | Score | Silver | Score | Bronze | Score |
|---|---|---|---|---|---|---|
| C1 men | Gareth Marriott (GBR) | 171.22 | Jacky Avril (FRA) | 172.20 | Danko Herceg (CRO) | 173.92 |
| C2 men | Czechoslovakia; Viktor Beneš; Milan Kučera | 186.67 | United States; Lecky Haller; Jamie McEwan | 190.08 | Poland; Krzysztof Kołomański; Michał Staniszewski | 191.19 |
| K1 men | Ian Raspin (GBR) | 159.12 | Pavel Přindiš (TCH) | 161.88 | Vincent Fondeviole (FRA) | 162.18 |
| K1 women | Anne Boixel (FRA) | 184.45 | Marianne Agulhon (FRA) | 186.90 | Zdenka Grossmannová (TCH) | 188.21 |
