= 1997 Canoe Slalom World Cup =

The 1997 Canoe Slalom World Cup was a series of five races in 4 canoeing and kayaking categories organized by the International Canoe Federation (ICF). It was the 10th edition. The series consisted of 4 regular world cup races and the world cup final.

== Calendar ==
Label	Venue	Date
World Cup Race 1	(France) Bourg-Saint-Maurice	21–22 June
World Cup Race 2	(Sweden) Björbo	28–29 June
World Cup Race 3	(Slovakia) Bratislava	4–6 July
World Cup Race 4	(United States) Ocoee	27–28 July
World Cup Final	(Canada) Minden	2–3 August

== Final standings ==
The winner of each world cup race in the men's K1 was awarded 30 points while in the other three categories the winner was awarded 25 points. The points scale reached down to 1 point for 20th place in the men's K1 (15th place in the other three categories). Only the best two results of each athlete from the first 4 world cups plus the result from the world cup final counted for the final world cup standings. Furthermore, an athlete or boat had to compete in the world cup final in order to be classified in the world cup rankings. If two or more athletes or boats were equal on points, the ranking was determined by their positions in the world cup final.

=== C1 men ===
Pos	Athlete	Points
1	Patrice Estanguet (FRA)	65
2	David Hearn (USA)	50
3	Gareth Marriott (GBR)	44
4	Michal Martikán (SVK)	37
5	Stanislav Ježek (CZE)	36
6	Tony Estanguet (FRA)	33
7	Hervé Delamarre (FRA)	32
8	Yves Narduzzi (FRA)	31
9	Gregor Terdič (SLO)	27
10	David Jančar (CZE)	25

=== C2 men ===
Pos	Athletes	Points
1	Frank Adisson/Wilfrid Forgues (FRA)	62
2	Marek Jiras/Tomáš Máder (CZE)	60
3	Miroslav Šimek/Jiří Rohan (CZE)	60
4	Éric Biau/Bertrand Daille (FRA)	41
5	Roman Štrba/Roman Vajs (SVK)	32
6	Jérôme Daille/Nil Georgel (FRA)	27
7	François Letourneau/Benoît Gauthier (CAN)	26
8	Stuart Bowman/Nick Smith (GBR)	17
9	Thierry Saidi/Emmanuel del Rey (FRA)	17
10	Luke Moore/Fred Coriell (USA)	12

=== K1 men ===
Pos	Athlete	Points
1	Scott Shipley (USA)	75
2	Ian Wiley (IRL)	70
3	Thomas Becker (GER)	70
4	Paul Ratcliffe (GBR)	68
5	Manuel Köhler (AUT)	58
6	David Ford (CAN)	49
7	Fedja Marušič (SLO)	45
8	Shaun Pearce (GBR)	42
9	Peter Nagy (SVK)	40
10	Jochen Lettmann (GER)	35

=== K1 women ===
Pos	Athlete	Points
1	Irena Pavelková (CZE)	65
2	Cristina Giai Pron (ITA)	49
3	Cathy Hearn (USA)	45
4	Brigitte Guibal (FRA)	41
5	Lynn Simpson (GBR)	39
6	Heather Corrie (GBR)	37
7	Anne Boixel (FRA)	36
8	Štěpánka Hilgertová (CZE)	30
9	Anouk Loubie (FRA)	23
10	Kara Weld (USA)	21

== Results ==
=== World Cup Race 1 ===
The first world cup race of the season took place in Bourg-Saint-Maurice, France from 21 to 22 June.

Event	Gold	Score	Silver	Score	Bronze	Score
C1 men	Patrice Estanguet (FRA)		David Hearn (USA)		Danko Herceg (CRO)	
C2 men	France; Frank Adisson; Wilfrid Forgues		Czech Republic; Miroslav Šimek; Jiří Rohan		Czech Republic; Marek Jiras; Tomáš Máder	
K1 men	Paul Ratcliffe (GBR)		Thomas Becker (GER)		Fedja Marušič (SLO)	
K1 women	Anne Boixel (FRA)		Štěpánka Hilgertová (CZE)		Irena Pavelková (CZE)	

=== World Cup Race 2 ===
The second world cup race of the season took place in Björbo, Sweden from 28 to 29 June.

Event	Gold	Score	Silver	Score	Bronze	Score
C1 men	Hervé Delamarre (FRA)	224.28	Patrice Estanguet (FRA)	224.86	Yves Narduzzi (FRA)	231.55
C2 men	Poland; Krzysztof Kołomański; Michał Staniszewski	232.94	France; Frank Adisson; Wilfrid Forgues	232.99	Czech Republic; Marek Jiras; Tomáš Máder	235.18
K1 men	Paul Ratcliffe (GBR)	203.95	Shaun Pearce (GBR)	207.08	Scott Shipley (USA)	208.32
K1 women	Cristina Giai Pron (ITA)	249.57	Cathy Hearn (USA)	249.64	Margaret Langford (CAN)	250.57

=== World Cup Race 3 ===
The third world cup race of the season took place at the Čunovo Water Sports Centre, Slovakia from 4 to 6 July.

Event	Gold	Score	Silver	Score	Bronze	Score
C1 men	Michal Martikán (SVK)	241.17	Patrice Estanguet (FRA)	241.27	Martin Lang (GER)	253.89
C2 men	Slovakia; Milan Kubáň; Marián Olejník	259.29	Czech Republic; Miroslav Šimek; Jiří Rohan	264.96	Slovakia; Ľuboš Šoška; Peter Šoška	270.00
K1 men	Manuel Köhler (AUT)	232.70	Thomas Becker (GER)	234.52	Fedja Marušič (SLO)	234.72
K1 women	Lynn Simpson (GBR)	269.41	Irena Pavelková (CZE)	273.34	Kordula Striepecke (GER)	278.96

=== World Cup Race 4 ===
The fourth world cup race of the season took place at the Ocoee Whitewater Center, Tennessee from 27 to 28 July.

Event	Gold	Score	Silver	Score	Bronze	Score
C1 men	Gareth Marriott (GBR)	291.38	Patrice Estanguet (FRA)	297.07	David Hearn (USA)	299.40
C2 men	France; Frank Adisson; Wilfrid Forgues	302.88	Czech Republic; Marek Jiras; Tomáš Máder	304.27	France; Éric Biau; Bertrand Daille	305.47
K1 men	Ian Wiley (IRL)	271.10	Scott Shipley (USA)	273.30	Ludovic Boulesteix (FRA)	278.23
K1 women	Brigitte Guibal (FRA)	314.96	Irena Pavelková (CZE)	324.56	Cristina Giai Pron (ITA)	329.65

=== World Cup Final ===
The final world cup race of the season took place at the Minden Wild Water Preserve, Ontario from 2 to 3 August.

Event	Gold	Score	Silver	Score	Bronze	Score
C1 men	Tony Estanguet (FRA)	242.41	Patrice Estanguet (FRA)	242.50	David Hearn (USA)	242.75
C2 men	Czech Republic; Marek Jiras; Tomáš Máder	251.83	Czech Republic; Miroslav Šimek; Jiří Rohan	254.81	France; Éric Biau; Bertrand Daille	259.99
K1 men	Scott Shipley (USA)	224.83	Ian Wiley (IRL)	227.61	Thomas Becker (GER)	231.15
K1 women	Irena Pavelková (CZE)	265.26	Heather Corrie (GBR)	270.52	Cathy Hearn (USA)	283.66
