= 1994 Canoe Slalom World Cup =

The 1994 Canoe Slalom World Cup was a series of five races in 4 canoeing and kayaking categories organized by the International Canoe Federation (ICF). It was the 7th edition. The series consisted of 4 regular world cup races and the world cup final.

== Calendar ==
Label	Venue	Date
World Cup Race 1	(United Kingdom) Nottingham	24–26 June
World Cup Race 2	(Germany) Augsburg	2–3 July
World Cup Race 3	(France) Bourg St.-Maurice	8–10 July
World Cup Race 4	(Spain) La Seu d'Urgell	16–17 July
World Cup Final	(Japan) Asahi, Aichi	16–18 September

== Final standings ==
The winner of each world cup race was awarded 25 points. The points scale reached down to 1 point for 15th place. Only the best two results of each athlete from the first 4 world cups plus the result from the world cup final counted for the final world cup standings. If two or more athletes or boats were equal on points, the ranking was determined by their positions in the world cup final.

=== C1 men ===
Pos	Athlete	Points
1	Gareth Marriott (GBR)	70
2	Lukáš Pollert (CZE)	56
3	Danko Herceg (CRO)	53
4	Patrice Estanguet (FRA)	46
5	Sören Kaufmann (GER)	44
6	Martin Lang (GER)	34
7	David Hearn (USA)	34
8	Hervé Delamarre (FRA)	29
9	Emmanuel Brugvin (FRA)	28
10	Boštjan Žitnik (SLO)	23

=== C2 men ===
Pos	Athletes	Points
1	Miroslav Šimek/Jiří Rohan (CZE)	60
2	Thierry Saidi/Emmanuel del Rey (FRA)	60
3	Fritz Haller/Lecky Haller (USA)	45
4	Frank Adisson/Wilfrid Forgues (FRA)	45
5	Manfred Berro/Michael Trummer (GER)	44
6	Éric Biau/Bertrand Daille (FRA)	39
7	Jérôme Daille/Gilles Lelievre (FRA)	33
8	André Ehrenberg/Michael Senft (GER)	31
9	Jaroslav Pospíšil/Jaroslav Pollert (CZE)	29
10	Krzysztof Kołomański/Michał Staniszewski (POL)	26

=== K1 men ===
Pos	Athlete	Points
1	Shaun Pearce (GBR)	65
2	Ian Raspin (GBR)	56
3	Scott Shipley (USA)	52
4	Jochen Lettmann (GER)	46
5	Oliver Fix (GER)	40
6	Albin Čižman (SLO)	36
7	Andrew Raspin (GBR)	33
8	Vincent Fondeviole (FRA)	30
9	Pierpaolo Ferrazzi (ITA)	30
10	Michael Reys (NED)	23

=== K1 women ===
Pos	Athlete	Points
1	Lynn Simpson (GBR)	65
2	Rachel Crosbee (GBR)	51
3	Kordula Striepecke (GER)	47
4	Štěpánka Hilgertová (CZE)	47
5	Marcela Sadilová (CZE)	46
6	Anouk Loubie (FRA)	41
7	Danielle Woodward (AUS)	36
8	Anne Boixel (FRA)	34
9	Dana Chladek (USA)	31
10	Angela Radermacher (GER)	31

== Results ==
=== World Cup Race 1 ===
The first world cup race of the season took place at the Holme Pierrepont National Watersports Centre in Nottingham from 24 to 26 June.

Event	Gold	Score	Silver	Score	Bronze	Score
C1 men	Danko Herceg (CRO)	121.75	Gareth Marriott (GBR)	121.80	Patrice Estanguet (FRA)	122.44
C2 men	France; Frank Adisson; Wilfrid Forgues	125.74	Germany; Manfred Berro; Michael Trummer	129.67	Poland; Krzysztof Kołomański; Michał Staniszewski	130.94
K1 men	Ian Raspin (GBR)	113.05	Shaun Pearce (GBR)	114.00	Oliver Fix (GER)	114.05
K1 women	Rachel Crosbee (GBR)	128.83	Štěpánka Hilgertová (CZE)	129.03	Lynn Simpson (GBR)	129.83

=== World Cup Race 2 ===
The second world cup race of the season took place at the Augsburg Eiskanal from 2 to 3 July.

Event	Gold	Score	Silver	Score	Bronze	Score
C1 men	Sören Kaufmann (GER)	144.93	Gareth Marriott (GBR)	145.02	Emmanuel Brugvin (FRA)	148.80
C2 men	France; Thierry Saidi; Emmanuel del Rey	158.03	Czech Republic; Miroslav Šimek; Jiří Rohan	158.12	Germany; André Ehrenberg; Michael Senft	159.20
K1 men	Jochen Lettmann (GER)	140.01	Shaun Pearce (GBR)	140.17	Vincent Fondeviole (FRA)	140.49
K1 women	Lynn Simpson (GBR)	162.34	Angela Radermacher (GER)	162.73	Kordula Striepecke (GER)	163.66

=== World Cup Race 3 ===
The third world cup race of the season took place in Bourg St.-Maurice, France from 8 to 10 July.

Event	Gold	Score	Silver	Score	Bronze	Score
C1 men	Gareth Marriott (GBR)	135.42	Danko Herceg (CRO)	138.83	David Hearn (USA)	139.93
C2 men	Czech Republic; Miroslav Šimek; Jiří Rohan	142.29	France; Éric Biau; Bertrand Daille	147.71	France; Thierry Saidi; Emmanuel del Rey	149.31
K1 men	Scott Shipley (USA)	129.22	Pierpaolo Ferrazzi (ITA)	130.52	Oliver Fix (GER)	131.74
K1 women	Anouk Loubie (FRA)	150.22	Rachel Crosbee (GBR)	150.82	Štěpánka Hilgertová (CZE)	152.20

=== World Cup Race 4 ===
The fourth world cup race of the season took place at the Segre Olympic Park in La Seu d'Urgell from 16 to 17 July.

Event	Gold	Score	Silver	Score	Bronze	Score
C1 men	Lukáš Pollert (CZE)	102.51	Patrice Estanguet (FRA)	104.17	Danko Herceg (CRO)	104.97
C2 men	France; Thierry Saidi; Emmanuel del Rey	109.10	Czech Republic; Miroslav Šimek; Jiří Rohan	110.29	Germany; Manfred Berro; Michael Trummer	112.56
K1 men	Oliver Fix (GER)	97.05	Albin Čižman (SLO)	97.19	Ian Wiley (IRL)	98.60
K1 women	Danielle Woodward (AUS)	112.68	Marcela Sadilová (CZE)	113.40	Isabelle Despres (FRA)	114.49

=== World Cup Final ===
The final world cup race of the season took place in Asahi, Aichi, Japan from 16 to 18 September.

Event	Gold	Score	Silver	Score	Bronze	Score
C1 men	Gareth Marriott (GBR)	148.39	Lukáš Pollert (CZE)	151.88	Hervé Delamarre (FRA)	151.94
C2 men	United States; Fritz Haller; Lecky Haller	164.10	France; Frank Adisson; Wilfrid Forgues	164.98	Czech Republic; Miroslav Šimek; Jiří Rohan	166.00
K1 men	Shaun Pearce (GBR)	143.49	Ian Raspin (GBR)	144.89	Scott Shipley (USA)	144.98
K1 women	Lynn Simpson (GBR)	162.27	Kordula Striepecke (GER)	162.89	Marcela Sadilová (CZE)	165.72
