= Canoeing at the 2000 Summer Olympics – Women's slalom K-1 =

Canoeing competition

These are the results of the women's K-1 slalom competition in canoeing at the 2000 Summer Olympics. The K-1 (kayak single) event is raced by one-person kayaks through a whitewater course. The venue for the 2000 Olympic competition was at the Penrith Whitewater Stadium.

== Medalists ==
Gold	Silver	Bronze
Štěpánka Hilgertová (CZE)	Brigitte Guibal (FRA)	Anne-Lise Bardet (FRA)

== Results ==
=== Qualifying ===
The 20 competitors each took two runs through the whitewater slalom course on 17 September. The combined score of both runs counted for the event with the top 15 advancing to the final round the following day.

Rank	Name	Nation	Run 1			Run 2			Result
Rank	Name	Nation	Time	Points	Total	Time	Points	Total	Total
1	Elena Kaliská	Slovakia	141.58	0	141.58	139.32	4	143.32	284.90
2	Štěpánka Hilgertová	Czech Republic	143.56	0	143.56	141.51	0	141.51	285.07
3	Irena Pavelková	Czech Republic	144.47	2	146.47	142.07	2	144.07	290.54
4	Brigitte Guibal	France	145.67	2	147.67	140.95	4	144.95	292.62
5	Gabriela Stacherová	Slovakia	148.55	0	148.55	146.38	0	146.38	294.93
6	Rebecca Giddens	United States	144.48	4	148.48	146.13	2	148.13	296.61
7	Mandy Planert	Germany	147.96	4	151.96	144.43	2	146.43	298.39
8	Susanne Hirt	Germany	151.29	4	155.29	141.65	2	143.65	298.94
9	Sandra Friedli	Switzerland	148.89	2	150.89	145.12	10	155.12	306.01
10	Violetta Oblinger-Peters	Austria	147.71	2	149.71	154.77	4	158.77	308.48
11	Anne-Lise Bardet	France	148.90	6	154.90	152.18	2	154.18	309.08
12	María Eizmendi	Spain	154.02	6	160.02	149.15	2	151.15	311.17
13	Laura Blakeman	Great Britain	151.47	4	155.47	148.00	8	156.00	311.47
14	Danielle Woodward	Australia	153.49	8	161.49	148.31	4	152.31	313.80
15	Margaret Langford	Canada	157.55	6	163.55	146.96	4	150.96	314.51
16	Cristina Giai Pron	Italy	153.34	4	157.34	158.55	6	164.55	321.89
17	Nada Mali	Slovenia	157.26	6	163.26	156.19	6	162.19	325.45
18	Eadaoin Ní Challarain	Ireland	159.93	8	167.93	157.56	6	163.56	331.49
19	Beata Grzesik	Poland	152.80	56	208.80	145.58	2	147.58	356.38
20	Florence Fernandes	Portugal	171.65	56	227.65	160.10	2	162.10	389.75

=== Final ===
15 competitors each took two runs through the whitewater slalom course on 18 September. The combined score of both runs counted for the event.

Rank	Name	Nation	Run 1			Run 2			Result
Rank	Name	Nation	Time	Points	Total	Time	Points	Total	Total
1st place, gold medalist(s)	Štěpánka Hilgertová	Czech Republic	125.21	0	125.21	121.83	0	121.83	247.04
2nd place, silver medalist(s)	Brigitte Guibal	France	122.98	2	124.98	124.90	2	126.90	251.88
3rd place, bronze medalist(s)	Anne-Lise Bardet	France	125.77	0	125.77	129.00	0	129.00	254.77
4	Elena Kaliská	Slovakia	126.68	0	126.68	125.27	4	129.27	255.95
5	Irena Pavelková	Czech Republic	127.31	2	129.31	126.80	0	126.80	256.11
6	Mandy Planert	Germany	124.03	2	126.03	129.82	2	131.82	257.85
7	Rebecca Giddens	United States	127.26	2	129.26	127.43	2	129.43	256.69
8	Danielle Woodward	Australia	128.58	4	132.58	129.31	0	129.31	261.89
9	Sandra Friedli	Switzerland	125.79	2	127.79	128.51	6	134.51	262.30
10	Susanne Hirt	Germany	129.08	2	131.08	132.93	2	134.93	266.01
11	Gabriela Stacherová	Slovakia	134.02	0	134.02	132.61	2	134.61	268.63
12	Laura Blakeman	Great Britain	134.91	2	136.91	136.80	0	136.80	273.71
13	Margaret Langford	Canada	136.82	4	140.82	129.32	4	133.32	274.14
14	María Eizmendi	Spain	134.97	2	136.97	135.58	4	139.58	276.55
15	Violetta Oblinger-Peters	Austria	143.64	2	145.64	134.65	2	136.65	282.29
