= Oliver Fix =

German slalom canoeist

Personal information
- Born: 21 June 1973 (age 53) Augsburg, Germany
- Height: 179 cm (5 ft 10 in)
- Weight: 72 kg (159 lb)
Medal record
Men's canoe slalom
Representing West Germany
Junior World Championships
| Gold medal – first place | 1990 Tavanasa | K1 team |
Representing Germany
Olympic Games
| Gold medal – first place | 1996 Atlanta | K1 |
World Championships
| Gold medal – first place | 1995 Nottingham | K1 |
| Gold medal – first place | 1995 Nottingham | K1 team |

Oliver Fix (born 21 June 1973 in Augsburg) is a German slalom canoeist who competed at the international level from 1990 to 1996. He won a gold medal in the K1 event at the 1996 Summer Olympics in Atlanta.

Fix also won gold medals in the K1 and K1 team events at the 1995 ICF Canoe Slalom World Championships in Nottingham.

His wife Gilda Montenegro competed for Costa Rica in two Summer Olympics in the women's slalom K1 event. Her best finish was 26th in Barcelona in 1992.

== World Cup individual podiums ==
| Season | Date | Venue | Position | Event |
|---|---|---|---|---|
| 1993 | 1 Aug 1993 | Augsburg | 3rd | K1 |
| 1994 | 26 Jun 1994 | Nottingham | 3rd | K1 |
| 1994 | 10 Jul 1994 | Bourg St.-Maurice | 3rd | K1 |
| 1994 | 17 Jul 1994 | La Seu d'Urgell | 1st | K1 |
| 1995 | 9 Jul 1995 | Mezzana | 3rd | K1 |
| 1995 | 16 Jul 1995 | Lofer | 1st | K1 |
