= Hervé Delamarre =

French canoeist

Medal record

Men's canoe slalom

Representing France

World Championships
Silver medal – second place	1991 Tacen	C1 team
Silver medal – second place	1993 Mezzana	C1

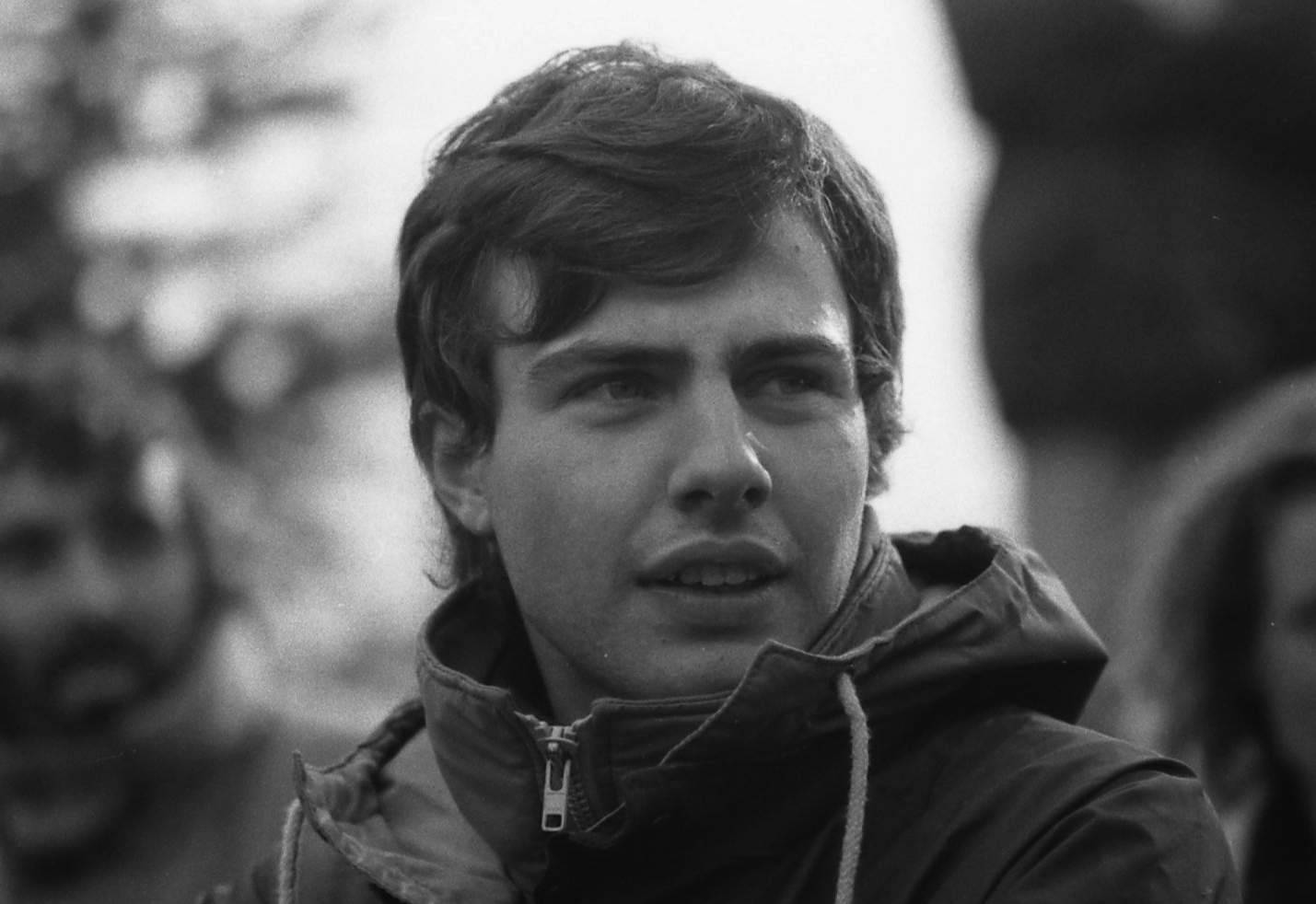
Hervé Delamarre

Hervé Delamarre (born 16 November 1967 in Bernay) is a French slalom canoeist.

== Career ==
Delamarre competed from the early 1990s to the early 2000s. He won two silver medals at the ICF Canoe Slalom World Championships (C1: 1993, C1 team: 1991).

Delamarre also finished fifth in the C1 event at the 1996 Summer Olympics in Atlanta.

== World Cup individual podiums ==
Season	Date	Venue	Position	Event
1991	7 Jul 1991	Augsburg	3rd	C1
1994	18 Sep 1994	Asahi, Aichi	3rd	C1
1997	29 Jun 1997	Björbo	1st	C1
1998	21 Jun 1998	Tacen	2nd	C1
1998	2 Aug 1998	Wausau	2nd	C1
2000	18 Jun 2000	Ocoee	3rd	C1
