= Ian Raspin =

British slalom canoeist (born 1967)

Medal record

Men's canoe slalom

Representing Great Britain

World Championships
Gold medal – first place	1997 Três Coroas	K1 team
Bronze medal – third place	1995 Nottingham	K1 team

Ian Michael Raspin (born 31 March 1967 in Guisborough) is a British slalom canoeist who competed from the late 1980s to the early 2000s.

== Early life ==
Ian has a younger brother, Andrew "Kidda" Raspin, also a British slalom canoeist who competed from the late 1980s to the early 2000s.

He lived in Skelton-in-Cleveland. Like his brother, he attended Trent Polytechnic, and lived in West Bridgford. He was a supply teacher in 1992.

== Career ==
He won two medals in the K1 team event at the ICF Canoe Slalom World Championships with a gold in 1997 and a bronze in 1995.

Raspin also competed in two Summer Olympic Games, earning his best finish of ninth in the K1 event in Atlanta in 1996.

== World Cup individual podiums ==
Season	Date	Venue	Position	Event
1991	11 Jul 1991	Reals	1st	K1
1992	20 Jun 1992	Bourg St.-Maurice	1st	K1
1993	25 Jul 1993	Lofer	2nd	K1
1994	26 Jun 1994	Nottingham	1st	K1
1994	18 Sep 1994	Asahi, Aichi	2nd	K1
1998	14 Jun 1998	Liptovský Mikuláš	3rd	K1
1998	21 Jun 1998	Tacen	3rd	K1
