= Luboš Hilgert (canoeist, born 1960) =

Czech slalom canoeist (born 1960)

Medal record

Men's canoe slalom

World Championships

Representing Czechoslovakia
Silver medal – second place	1981 Bala	K1
Bronze medal – third place	1983 Meran	K1 team
Bronze medal – third place	1985 Augsburg	K1
Bronze medal – third place	1991 Tacen	K1 team

Representing Czech Republic
Bronze medal – third place	1993 Mezzana	K1 team

Luboš Hilgert (born 25 October 1960 in Prague) is a Czech slalom canoeist. He competed for Czechoslovakia and the Czech Republic in the 1980s and 1990s. He won five medals at the ICF Canoe Slalom World Championships with a silver (K1: 1981) and four bronzes (K1: 1985, K1 team: 1983, 1991, 1993).

Hilgert also competed in two Summer Olympics, earning his best finish of 18th in the K1 event at Atlanta in 1996 Summer Olympics.

He is the husband of Štěpánka Hilgertová, a slalom canoeist who competed for Czechoslovakia and the Czech Republic in six Summer Olympics. Their son Luboš Hilgert is also an active slalom canoeist. Amálie Hilgertová is his niece.

== World Cup individual podiums ==
	1st place, gold medalist(s)	2nd place, silver medalist(s)	3rd place, bronze medalist(s)	Total
K1	3	4	3	10

Season	Date	Venue	Position	Event
1988	4 July 1988	South Bend	2nd	K1
1989	12 Aug 1989	Mezzana	2nd	K1
1989	15 Aug 1989	Augsburg	2nd	K1
1989	20 Aug 1989	Tacen	3rd	K1
1990	1990	Savage River	1st	K1
1990	11 Aug 1990	Augsburg	2nd	K1
1990	18 Aug 1990	Bourg St.-Maurice	3rd	K1
1992	16 Feb 1992	Murupara	1st	K1
1992	23 Feb 1992	Launceston	3rd	K1
1993	1 Aug 1993	Augsburg	1st	K1
