= Bogusława Knapczyk =

Polish canoeist

Personal information
- Born: 8 April 1970 (age 55) Szczawnica, Poland
- Height: 162 cm (5 ft 4 in)
- Weight: 61 kg (134 lb)

Bogusława Knapczyk (born 8 April 1970, in Szczawnica) is a Polish slalom canoer who competed from the late 1980s to the mid-1990s. Competing in two Summer Olympics, she earned her best finish of 19th in the K-1 event in Barcelona in 1992.
