= Gilda Montenegro =

Costa Rican canoeist

Gilda Montenegro Conejo (born January 27, 1967) is a Costa Rican slalom canoeist who competed in the 1990s. Competing in two Summer Olympics, her best finish was 26th in the K-1 event in Barcelona in 1992.

Montenegro's husband, Oliver Fix of Germany, won the gold medal in the men's K-1 slalom event at the 1996 Summer Olympics in Atlanta.
