= Peter Šoška =

Slovak slalom canoeist (born 1976)

Personal information
- Nationality: Slovak
- Born: 21 October 1976 (age 49) Žilina, Czechoslovakia
- Height: 1.90 m (6 ft 3 in)
- Weight: 72 kg (159 lb)

Sport
- Country: Slovakia
- Sport: Canoe slalom
- Event: C2, C1
Medal record
Men's canoe slalom
Representing Slovakia
World Championships
Bronze medal – third place	2006 Prague	C2 team
European Championships
Bronze medal – third place	1996 Augsburg	C2 team

Peter Šoška (born 21 October 1976) is a Slovak slalom canoeist who competed at the international level from 1994 to 2006, specializing mostly in the C2 discipline where he was partnered by his younger brother Ľuboš Šoška.

The brothers won a bronze medal in the C2 team event at the 2006 ICF Canoe Slalom World Championships in Prague. They also won a bronze medal in the same event at the 1996 European Championships in Augsburg.

Peter and Ľuboš competed at the 1996 Summer Olympics in Atlanta where they finished 10th in the C2 event.

== Career statistics ==
=== Major championships results timeline ===
Event		1995	1996	1997	1998	1999	2000	2001	2002	2003	2004	2005	2006
Olympic Games	C2	Not held	10	Not held			—	Not held			—	Not held	
World Championships	C2	24	Not held	17	Not held	—	Not held		12	12	Not held	—	16
World Championships	C2 team	4	Not held	4	Not held	—	Not held		—	6	Not held	—	3
European Championships	C1	Not held	—	Not held	24	Not held	—	Not held	—	Not held	—	—	—
European Championships	C2	Not held	7	Not held	—	Not held	12	Not held	—	Not held	4	—	17
European Championships	C2 team	Not held	3	Not held	—	Not held	2 (Note: Not a medal event due to low number of participating nations)	Not held	—	Not held	2	—	5

=== World Cup individual podiums ===
Season	Date	Venue	Position	Event
1997	6 Jul 1997	Bratislava	3rd	C2
