= Alexandre Avril =

French politician (born 1992)

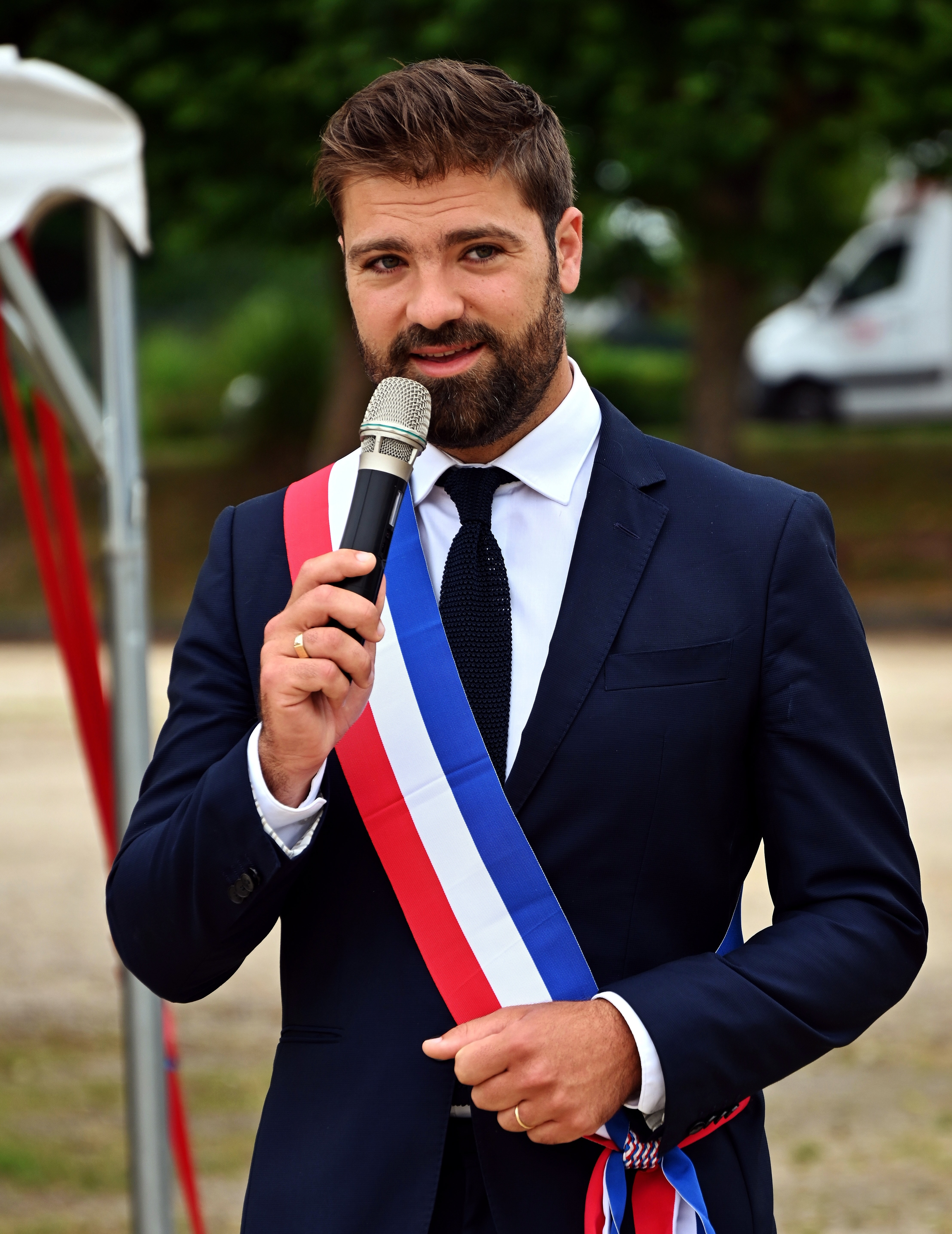
- Avril in 2024

Member of the Regional Council of Centre-Val de Loire
- Incumbent
- Assumed office 2 July 2021
- Constituency: Loir-et-Cher

President of Sologne des Rivières
- Incumbent
- Assumed office 3 July 2020
- Preceded by: Olivier Pavy

Mayor of Salbris
- Incumbent
- Assumed office 28 June 2020
- Preceded by: Olivier Pavy

Personal details
- Born: 19 April 1992 (age 34) Romorantin-Lanthenay, France
- Party: Union of the Right for the Republic (since 2024)
- Other political affiliations: The Republicans (until 2024)
- Relatives: Jacky Avril (uncle)
- Education: Lycée Henri-IV
- Alma mater: École normale supérieure HEC Paris; Paris-Sorbonne University; Panthéon-Sorbonne University

Alexandre Avril (French pronunciation: [alɛksɑ̃dʁ avʁil]; born 19 April 1992) is a French politician, bookshop owner and bookseller, and local official. He has served as mayor of Salbris and president of the Sologne des Rivières since 2020, and as a member of the Regional Council of Centre-Val de Loire since 2021.

In 2024, he was appointed Vice President of the Union of the Right for the Republic (UDR), a new political movement led by Éric Ciotti, which he joined leaving The Republicans (LR). He is in charge of policy proposals and ideological orientation of the movement.

He is also known for his academic work on Friedrich Nietzsche and René Girard.

In media, Avril has been described as holding right-wing to far-right positions, and faces critics about his conservative views on LGBTQ rights, Islam, immigration and laicity.

== Early life and career ==
Avril was born in Romorantin-Lanthenay and grew up in Salbris, in the Sologne region.

His father worked as an accountant and his mother in a sheltered workshop for people with disabilities. His paternal grandfather worked as a factory worker for Matra and his grandmother was a primary schoolteacher in Salbris. Alexandre Avril is the nephew of Jacky Avril, a French slalom canoeist and bronze medalist at the 1992 Summer Olympics.

He attended Lycée Claude-de-France in Romorantin, then completed literary preparatory classes at Lycée Henri-IV in Paris. He entered the École normale supérieure (ENS Ulm) in 2013. He also studied at the international business school HEC Paris and Panthéon-Sorbonne University, from which he graduated in 2017. He received a PhD in philosophy from Paris Sciences et Lettres University in 2023, under the supervision of Paolo D'Iorio.

He has taught seminars at the École normale supérieure. He later worked in finance at the Italian investment bank Mediobanca and founded a consultancy on local development. He also worked as parliamentary assistant to Socialist Party senator Jeanny Lorgeoux. In 2022, he and his wife opened a bookstore in Salbris called Le Temps Retrouvé.

== Political career ==
A member of the Union for a Popular Movement (UMP) from 2007, Avril worked on François Fillon's 2017 presidential campaign. In 2017, he launched a digital grievances book for the Sologne region.

In 2020, Avril campaigned under the slogan "United for Salbris" during the municipal elections, as the lead candidate of an independent right-wing list. He was elected mayor during the second round, beating the other list with nearly 58% of electoral votes. In July 2020, he was elected president of the intermunicipal council Sologne des Rivières. In the 2021 regional election in Centre-Val de Loire, he was designated as lead candidate of the Union of the Right and Centre in Loir-et-Cher, and was elected to the Regional Council.

He was elected unopposed as leader of The Republicans in Loir-et-Cher in November 2023.

Ahead of the 2024 legislative election, Avril supported Éric Ciotti's alliance with the National Rally. In September 2024, he joined the newly created Union of the Right for the Republic (UDR) as Vice President for studies and program development.

== Political positions ==
In high school, Avril was defending 'social justice', according to an ancient professor. During the 2020 Salbris municipal election, he was presented as a "social gaullist". After few months, citizens told he made a "political shift" to the far-right. He is described by Mediapart as "trumpist". Libération found links with "radical far-right". According to L'Humanité, he created in Salbris a "right-wing union laboratory". Many left-wing medias wrote he was following French billionaire Pierre-Édouard Stérin's "far-right" project for 2026 municipal elections.

== Electoral history ==
=== Municipal election ===
2020 Salbris municipal election (1st round)
Party	Candidate	Votes	%
LR	Alexandre Avril (chief)	898	41.26%
DVD	Pascal Sauvaget (chief)	656	30.14%
DVD	Olivier Pavy (chief)	622	28.58%
Total votes		2,176	100.0%

2020 Salbris municipal election (2nd round)
Party	Candidate	Votes	%
LR	Alexandre Avril (chief)	1,239	57.95%
DVD	Christophe Matho (chief)	899	42.04%
Total votes		2,138	100.0%

Pavy's list rallied Sauvaget's one before the 2nd round. The list of Avril won 23 municipal council seats and 11 communauté de communes seats. The list of Matho won six MC and two CC seats.

== Controversies ==
=== LGBTQIA+ Community ===
In June 2022, Avril was accused of anti-Muslim racism and homophobia by the FSU after he made public declarations on CNews and accusations against the organization of a sensibilization day on LGBTQIA+ Community in a Salbris school. In response, he said that "the fight against homophobia is necessary" and "parents asked [him] to intervene".

=== Immigration ===
In April and May 2024, Avril posted a message on his Facebook page about the murder of Matisse Marchais, a 15-year-old inhabitant of Châteauroux. He linked the murder to what he called "mass immigration". He was supported by far-right activists.

Several local elected people protested against this post. Arguing it was "disrespectful" to use the murder history in "political goal". He responded that "the role of politics is to draw conclusions from what happens. If no conclusion is drawn from the dramas, then the world will never improve".

A few days letter, both mayors of Salbris and Lamotte-Beuvron sent letters to each other about a center for asylum-seekers. The second one said he was schocked by Avril words.

=== Laicity ===
In December 2024, he accused a professor on X (ex-Twitter) of reporting a failure to comply secularism in a Salbris school because of a Saint Nicholas Day gathering he organised for the children of his town.
