= Peter Eckhardt =

Australian slalom canoeist (born 1960)

Peter Ralph Eckhardt (born 10 September 1960) is an Australian slalom canoeist who competed from the mid-1980s the early 1990s. He finished 20th in the C-1 event at the 1992 Summer Olympics in Barcelona.
