= Petr Štercl =

Czechoslovak-Czech slalom canoeist (born 1966)

Medal record

Men's canoe slalom

Representing Czechoslovakia

World Championships
Silver medal – second place	1991 Tacen	C2 team

Representing Czech Republic

World Championships
Gold medal – first place	1993 Mezzana	C2 team
Gold medal – first place	1995 Nottingham	C2 team
Silver medal – second place	1997 Três Coroas	C2 team

European Championships
Gold medal – first place	1998 Roudnice nad Labem	C2 team

Petr Štercl (born October 20, 1966, in Kroměříž) is a Czechoslovak-Czech slalom canoeist who competed in the 1990s partnering his twin brother Pavel in the C2 boat throughout his career.

Together they won four medals in the C2 team event at the ICF Canoe Slalom World Championships with two golds (1993, 1995) and two silvers (1991, 1997). They also have a gold medal from the same event from the 1998 European Championships in Roudnice nad Labem.

Štercl finished sixth in the C2 event for Czechoslovakia at the 1992 Summer Olympics in Barcelona. Four years later in Atlanta, he finished sixth in the C2 event for the Czech Republic.

== World Cup individual podiums ==
Season	Date	Venue	Position	Event
1991	11 Jul 1991	Reals	1st	C2
1991	1 Sep 1991	Wausau	2nd	C2
1992	16 Feb 1992	Murupara	2nd	C2
1992	23 Feb 1992	Launceston	2nd	C2
1995	25 Jun 1995	Prague	3rd	C2
1995	2 Jul 1995	Tacen	2nd	C2
1996	21 Apr 1996	Ocoee	3rd	C2
1998	13 Sep 1998	La Seu d'Urgell	2nd	C2
