= Roy Sharplin =

Canadian slalom canoer (born 1966)

Personal information
- Full name: Roy Douglas Sharplin
- Nationality: Canadian
- Born: November 18, 1966 (age 59) Toronto, Ontario, Canada

Sport
- Sport: Canoe slalom
- Event: C-1

Achievements and titles
- Olympic finals: 1992 Summer Olympics

Roy Douglas Sharplin (born November 18, 1966, in Toronto) is a Canadian slalom canoer who competed from the late 1980s to the late 1990s. He finished 22nd in the C-1 event at the 1992 Summer Olympics in Barcelona.
