= Djurmo =

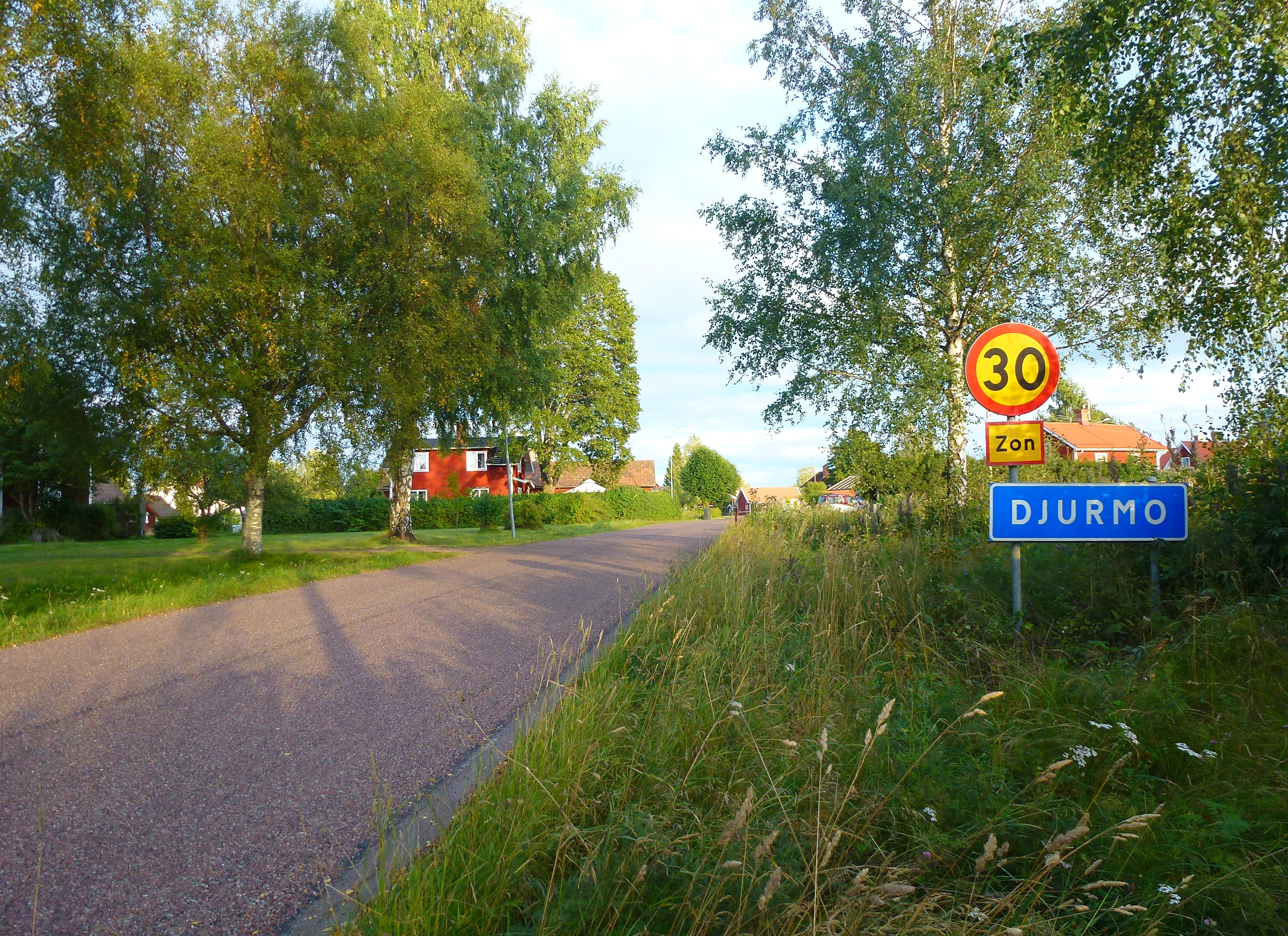

- Location within Dalarna Location within Sweden
- Coordinates: 60°33′N 15°11′E
- Country: Sweden
- Province: Dalarna
- County: Dalarna County
- Municipality: Gagnef Municipality

Area
  - Total: 0.92 km^{2} (0.36 sq mi)

Population (31 December 2010)
  - Total: 711
  - Density: 775/km^{2} (2,010/sq mi)
- Time zone: UTC+1 (CET)
  - Summer (DST): UTC+2 (CEST)

Djurmo is a locality situated in Gagnef Municipality, Dalarna County, Sweden. It had 711 inhabitants in 2010.
