= Canoeing at the 1992 Summer Olympics – Women's slalom K-1 =

These are the results of the women's K-1 slalom competition in canoeing at the 1992 Summer Olympics. The K-1 (kayak single) event is raced by one-person kayaking through a whitewater course. The venue for the 1992 Olympic competition was in La Seu d'Urgell.

== Medalists ==
Gold	Silver	Bronze
Elisabeth Micheler-Jones (GER)	Danielle Woodward (AUS)	Dana Chladek (USA)

== Results ==
The 26 competitors each took two runs through the whitewater slalom course on August 1. The best time of the two runs counted for the event.

Rank	Name	Run 1			Run 2			Result
Rank	Name	Time	Points	Total	Time	Points	Total	Total
Gold	Elisabeth Micheler-Jones (GER)	2:06.19	10	136.19	2:06.41	0	126.41	126.41
Silver	Danielle Woodward (AUS)	2:21.54	10	151.54	2:08.27	0	128.27	128.27
Bronze	Dana Chladek (USA)	2:06.75	5	131.75	2:11.46	55	186.46	131.75
4	Eva Roth (GER)	2:32.53	0	152.53	2:07.29	5	132.29	132.29
5	Marianne Agulhon (FRA)	2:15.44	5	140.44	2:12.89	0	132.89	132.89
6	Kordula Striepecke (GER)	2:11.51	5	136.51	2:09.49	5	134.49	134.49
7	Zdenka Grossmannová (TCH)	2:15.42	5	140.42	2:10.79	5	135.79	135.79
8	Joanne Woods (CAN)	2:08.06	10	138.06	2:16.08	15	151.08	138.06
9	Cathy Hearn (USA)	2:31.99	0	151.99	2:14.51	5	139.51	139.51
10	Lynn Simpson (GBR)	2:15.38	5	140.38	2:14.24	10	144.24	140.38
11	Anne Boixel (FRA)	2:18.19	65	203.19	2:15.81	5	140.81	140.81
12	Štěpánka Hilgertová (TCH)	2:06.43	15	141.43	2:17.30	15	152.30	141.43
13	Karen Like (GBR)	2:18.34	10	148.34	2:17.26	5	142.26	142.26
14	María Eizmendi (ESP)	2:18.39	5	143.39	2:22.84	15	157.84	143.39
15	Margaret Langford (CAN)	2:25.36	0	145.36	2:43.77	15	178.77	145.36
16	Rachel Fox (GBR)	2:13.82	15	148.82	2:17.64	10	147.64	147.64
17	Cristina Martínez (ESP)	2:33.14	15	168.14	2:19.02	10	149.02	149.02
18	Cristina Giai Pron (ITA)	2:20.41	15	155.41	2:19.03	10	149.03	149.03
19	Bogusława Knapczyk (POL)	2:30.78	10	160.78	2:19.59	10	149.59	149.59
20	Marcela Sadilová (TCH)	2:15.38	15	150.38	2:20.99	110	250.99	150.38
21	Myriam Fox-Jerusalmi (FRA)	2:20.86	10	150.86	2:10.76	20	150.76	150.76
22	Sheryl Boyle (CAN)	2:26.09	10	156.09	2:26.66	20	166.66	156.09
23	Hiroko Kobayashi (JPN)	2:18.84	20	158.84	2:13.79	120	253.79	158.84
24	Dzintra Blūma (LAT)	2:43.37	10	173.37	2:25.83	15	160.83	160.83
25	Maylon Hanold (USA)	2:47.75	165	332.75	2:53.80	20	193.80	193.80
26	Gilda Montenegro (CRC)	2:50.27	470	640.27	No time	225	Did not finish	640.27
