= Gagnef Municipality =

Gagnef Municipality Gagnefs kommun
- Municipality
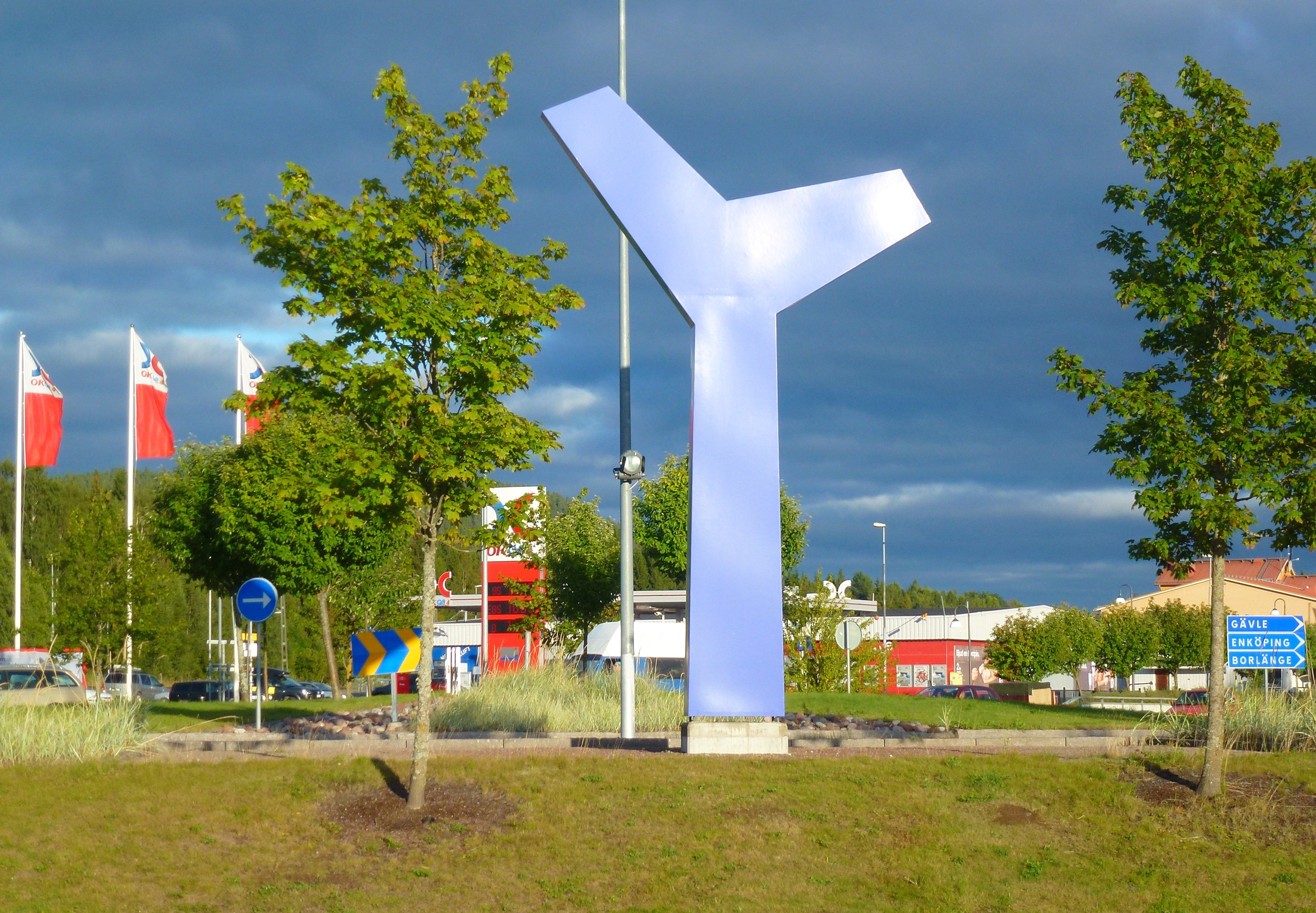

- Coat of arms

- Coordinates: 60°33′N 15°08′E
- Country: Sweden
- County: Dalarna County
- Seat: Djurås

Area
  - Total: 812.3221 km^{2} (313.6393 sq mi)
  - Land: 767.1521 km^{2} (296.1991 sq mi)
  - Water: 45.17 km^{2} (17.44 sq mi)
- Area as of 1 January 2014.

Population (30 June 2025)
  - Total: 10,347
  - Density: 13.488/km^{2} (34.933/sq mi)
- Time zone: UTC+1 (CET)
  - Summer (DST): UTC+2 (CEST)
- ISO 3166 code: SE
- Province: Dalarna
- Municipal code: 2026
- Website: www.gagnef.se
- Density is calculated using land area only.

Gagnef Municipality (Swedish: Gagnefs kommun) is a municipality in Dalarna County in central Sweden. Its seat is located in the town of Djurås with 2,257 inhabitants, with the largest town being Mockfjärd with 2365 inhabitants. The locality of Gagnef itself is a smaller village.

In 1971 "old" Gagnef was amalgamated with Floda, forming the present municipality.

The industry is dominated by small and semi-small companies mainly operating in the forest industry.

Geographically, the two rivers of the Västerdal River and the Österdal River flow together in Gagnef to form the Dal River, as represented in the municipality's coat of arms.

== Localities ==
- Björbo
- Bäsna
- Djurmo
- Djurås (seat)
- Floda
- Gagnef
- Mockfjärd
- Sifferbo

== Demographics ==
This is a demographic table based on Gagnef Municipality's electoral districts in the 2022 Swedish general election sourced from SVT's election platform, in turn taken from SCB official statistics.

In total there were 10,500 residents, including 8,044 Swedish citizens of voting age. 44.1% voted for the left coalition and 55.0% for the right coalition. Indicators are in percentage points except population totals and income.

Location	Residents	Citizen adults	Left vote	Right vote	Employed	Swedish parents	Foreign heritage	Income SEK	Degree
Location			%	%					
Björbo	798	629	39.3	60.3	83	91	9	23,167	24
Floda	945	774	49.8	48.8	84	91	9	21,469	33
Gagnef 1	1,877	1,468	47.3	51.8	86	92	8	26,041	39
Gagnef 2	2,036	1,614	43.9	55.4	82	89	11	25,445	38
Gagnef 3	1,212	904	44.0	54.6	88	91	9	27,482	31
Gagnef 4	1,232	915	43.5	56.1	88	94	6	27,844	38
Mockfjärd	2,400	1,740	40.4	58.6	82	87	13	24,228	24
Source: SVT

== Riksdag elections ==
Year	%	Votes	V	S	MP	C	L	KD	M	SD	NyD	Left	Right
1973	92.0	5,652	3.0	42.8		41.5	5.1	1.8	5.2			45.8	51.8
1976	92.9	6,184	2.6	41.6		38.6	9.0	1.8	6.3			44.1	53.9
1979	90.7	6,325	3.6	43.1		32.3	6.6	2.4	11.6			46.7	50.6
1982	92.1	6,468	3.3	45.3	2.0	27.4	3.8	2.7	15.3			48.6	46.5
1985	90.6	6,464	3.3	45.0	2.1	24.1	11.4		14.0			48.3	49.4
1988	86.1	6,186	4.2	42.9	6.6	22.2	8.9	4.4	10.7			53.7	41.7
1991	86.2	6,452	3.1	38.3	4.7	17.3	5.9	8.9	13.6		6.9	41.4	45.6
1994	87.0	6,529	5.4	45.9	7.5	15.2	4.7	5.1	14.3		1.2	58.8	39.3
1998	81.7	6,078	12.3	35.7	7.3	10.3	2.8	14.3	14.5			55.3	41.9
2002	79.4	5,802	7.3	40.4	4.5	15.1	8.9	10.6	9.9	0.8		52.2	44.5
2006	81.5	6,081	5.7	38.6	4.1	16.3	4.1	7.3	18.2			48.4	45.9
2010	85.8	6,542	5.0	34.9	6.1	12.3	4.1	5.7	23.7	7.3		45.9	45.7
2014	88.1	6,771	5.1	32.7	4.3	11.6	3.1	4.2	18.1	17.3		42.2	37.0
2018	89.3	6,901	6.1	27.4	2.8	13.7	3.8	8.5	14.4	21.8		50.0	48.4
