= Anne-Lise Bardet =

French slalom canoeist and Olympic medalist

Medal record

Women's canoe slalom

Representing France

Olympic Games
Bronze medal – third place	2000 Sydney	K1

World Championships
Gold medal – first place	2002 Bourg St.-Maurice	K1 team

European Championships
Bronze medal – third place	2002 Bratislava	K1 team

Anne-Lise Bardet (born 18 November 1974) is a French slalom canoeist who competed in the 1990s and 2000s.

She won the bronze medal in the K1 event at the 2000 Summer Olympics in Sydney.

Bardet also won a gold medal in the K1 team event at the 2002 ICF Canoe Slalom World Championships in Bourg St.-Maurice and a bronze medal in the same event at the 2002 European Championships in Bratislava.

== World Cup individual podiums ==
Season	Date	Venue	Position	Event
2000	18 Jun 2000	Ocoee	3rd	K1

== Bibliography ==
- DatabaseOlympics.com profile
- ICF medalists for Olympic and World Championships - Part 2: rest of flatwater (now sprint) and remaining canoeing disciplines: 1936-2007.
- Evans, Hilary; Gjerde, Arild; Heijmans, Jeroen; Mallon, Bill; et al. "Anne-Lise Bardet". Olympics at Sports-Reference.com. Sports Reference LLC. Archived from the original on 2020-04-17.
