= Canoeing at the 1992 Summer Olympics – Men's slalom C-1 =

These are the results of the men's C-1 slalom competition in canoeing at the 1992 Summer Olympics. The C-1 (canoe single) event is raced by one-man canoes through a whitewater course. The venue for the 1992 Olympic competition was in La Seu d'Urgell.

== Medalists ==
Gold	Silver	Bronze
Lukáš Pollert (TCH)	Gareth Marriott (GBR)	Jacky Avril (FRA)

== Results ==
The 31 competitors each took two runs through the whitewater slalom course on August 1. The best time of the two runs counted for the event.

Rank	Name	Run 1			Run 2			Result
Rank	Name	Time	Points	Total	Time	Points	Total	Total
Gold	Lukáš Pollert (TCH)	1:54.71	5	119.71	1:53.69	0	113.69	113.69
Silver	Gareth Marriott (GBR)	1:56.13	10	126.13	1:51.48	5	116.48	116.48
Bronze	Jacky Avril (FRA)	1:57.18	0	117.18	1:55.75	20	135.75	117.18
4	Jon Lugbill (USA)	1:53.62	5	118.62	1:58.69	0	118.69	118.62
5	Renato de Monti (ITA)	2:10.01	0	130.01	1:59.02	0	119.02	119.02
6	Martin Lang (GER)	1:55.67	5	120.67	1:59.19	0	119.19	119.19
7	Emmanuel Brugvin (FRA)	2:00.14	5	125.14	1:54.19	5	119.19	119.19
8	Juraj Ontko (TCH)	2:00.23	0	120.23	1:56.29	20	136.29	120.23
9	Danko Herceg (CRO)	1:58.55	10	128.55	1:55.41	5	120.41	120.41
10	Boštjan Žitnik (SLO)	1:57.72	20	137.72	1:56.09	5	121.09	121.09
11	David Hearn (USA)	2:01.70	0	121.70	2:01.57	0	121.57	121.57
12	Mike Corcoran (IRL)	2:06.42	5	131.42	1:56.57	5	121.57	121.57
13	Grzegorz Sarata (POL)	2:16.88	25	161.88	2:02.12	0	122.12	122.12
14	Jože Vidmar (SLO)	2:02.26	0	122.26	1:59.57	5	124.57	122.26
15	Zbigniew Miązek (POL)	2:03.03	5	128.03	2:02.37	0	122.37	122.37
16	Borut Javornik (SLO)	1:59.78	15	134.78	2:03.94	0	123.94	123.94
17	Sören Kaufmann (GER)	1:54.80	10	124.80	1:58.97	15	133.97	124.80
18	Thierry Humeau (FRA)	2:02.42	5	127.42	2:04.91	0	124.91	124.91
19	Larry Norman (CAN)	2:11.65	15	146.65	2:03.96	5	128.96	128.96
20	Peter Eckhardt (AUS)	2:08.98	0	128.98	2:15.74	30	165.74	128.98
21	Adam Clawson (USA)	2:04.23	5	129.23	2:07.17	70	197.17	129.23
22	Roy Sharplin (CAN)	2:10.71	5	135.71	2:19.48	5	144.48	135.71
23	Stjepan Perestegi (CRO)	2:21.29	10	151.19	2:11.98	5	136.98	136.98
24	Marc Vicente (ESP)	2:12.88	10	142.88	2:09.38	10	139.38	139.38
25	Mark Delaney (GBR)	2:06.66	20	146.66	2:09.61	10	139.61	139.61
26	Leonardo Selbach (BRA)	2:15.54	20	155.84	2:10.60	10	140.60	140.60
27	Krzysztof Bieryt (POL)	2:17.61	5	142.61	2:24.01	25	169.01	142.61
28	Pere Guerrero (ESP)	2:18.49	10	148.49	2:14.74	10	144.74	144.74
29	Jakub Prüher (TCH)	2:09.53	20	149.53	2:16.85	15	151.85	151.85
30	Daniel Norman (CAN)	2:32.80	5	157.80	2:27.54	20	167.54	157.80
31	Lazo Miloević (IOP)	No time	55	Did not finish	2:35.22	15	170.22	170.22
