= Lazo Miloević =

Macedonian slalom canoer (born 1975)

Lazar "Lazo" Miloević (Macedonian: Лазар "Лазо" Милоевиќ; born 20 January 1975) is a Macedonian slalom canoer who competed in the early 1990s. He finished 31st in the C-1 event at the 1992 Summer Olympics in Barcelona as an Independent Olympic Participant.
