= Scott Shipley =

American canoeist (born 1971)

Medal record

Men's canoe slalom

Representing United States

World Championships
Silver medal – second place	1995 Nottingham	K1
Silver medal – second place	1997 Três Coroas	K1
Silver medal – second place	1999 La Seu d'Urgell	K1

Junior World Championships
Gold medal – first place	1988 La Seu d'Urgell	K1

Scott R. Shipley (born May 15, 1971 in Poulsbo, Washington) is an American slalom canoeist who competed at the international level from 1988 to 2004.

He won three silver medals in the K1 event at the ICF Canoe Slalom World Championships, earning them in 1995, 1997, and 1999. He won the overall World Cup title in K1 three times (1993, 1995 and 1997). In 2010, he became U.S. national champion in C2.

Shipley also competed in three Summer Olympics, earning his best finish of fifth in the K1 event in Sydney in 2000.

With Mechanical Engineering degrees from Georgia Institute of Technology, Bachelors 2001, Masters 2002, he retired from full-time competition for a job with S2O Design and Engineering, in Boulder, Colorado. In that job, he assisted Gary Lacy (the engineer of record) in the design of the $37 million U.S. National Whitewater Center in Charlotte, North Carolina, which opened in 2006. In a redesign of the man-made whitewater park concept, Shipley is patenting Rapidblocs—plastic structures that can be moved to create different rapids. Rapidblocs are utilized in the London Olympic Whitewater Park, whose rapids his company, S2o, designed. The Rapidblocs allow the park to adjust their rapids to appeal to a wider audience than the Olympic Kayakers that will utilize them in the games.

== World Cup individual podiums ==
	1st place, gold medalist(s)	2nd place, silver medalist(s)	3rd place, bronze medalist(s)	Total
K1	11	5	8	24

Season	Date	Venue	Position	Event
1992	31 May 1992	Nottingham	1st	K1
1993	18 July 1993	La Seu d'Urgell	2nd	K1
1993	21 August 1993	Minden	3rd	K1
1993	31 August 1993	Ocoee	1st	K1
1994	10 July 1994	Bourg St.-Maurice	1st	K1
1994	18 September 1994	Asahi, Aichi	3rd	K1
1995	16 July 1995	Lofer	2nd	K1
1995	1 October 1995	Ocoee	1st	K1
1996	21 April 1996	Ocoee	1st	K1
1996	9 June 1996	La Seu d'Urgell	2nd	K1
1996	16 June 1996	Augsburg	3rd	K1
1997	29 June 1997	Björbo	3rd	K1
1997	28 July 1997	Ocoee	2nd	K1
1997	3 August 1997	Minden	1st	K1
1998	14 June 1998	Liptovský Mikuláš	1st	K1
1998	28 June 1998	Augsburg	3rd	K1
1998	2 August 1998	Wausau	1st	K1
1999	20 June 1999	Tacen	1st	K1
1999	24 June 1999	Tacen	3rd	K1
1999	15 August 1999	Bratislava	2nd	K1
1999	22 August 1999	Augsburg	1st	K1
1999	3 October 1999	Penrith	3rd	K1
2000	30 April 2000	Penrith	3rd	K1
2000	30 July 2000	Augsburg	1st	K1
