= Jacky Avril =

French slalom canoeist

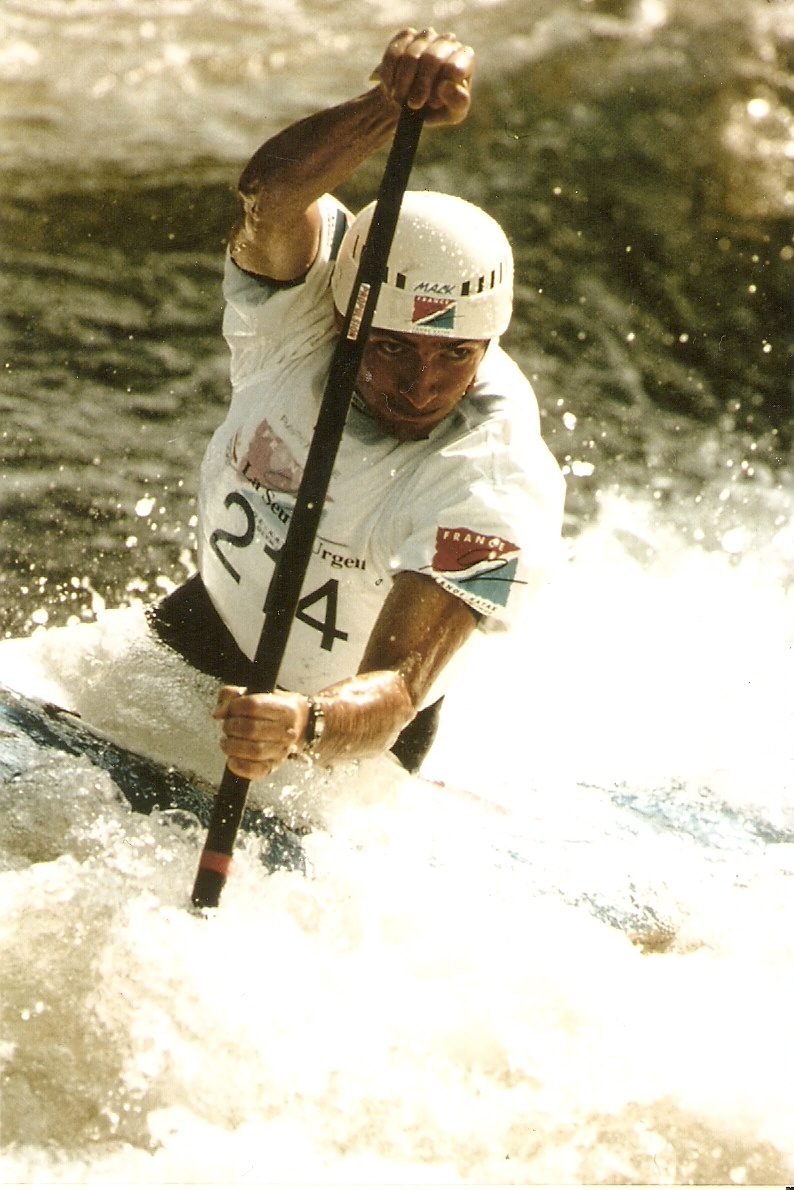

Personal information
- Born: 19 July 1964 (age 62) Vierzon, France
- Relative: Alexandre Avril (nephew)
Medal record
Men's canoe slalom
Representing France
Olympic Games
Bronze medal – third place	1992 Barcelona	C1
World Championships
Silver medal – second place	1987 Bourg St.-Maurice	C1 team
Silver medal – second place	1989 Savage River	C1 team
Silver medal – second place	1991 Tacen	C1 team
Bronze medal – third place	1991 Tacen	C1

Jacky Avril (born 19 July 1964 in Vierzon) is a French slalom canoeist who competed from the mid-1980s to the early 1990s. He won the bronze medal in the C1 event at the 1992 Summer Olympics in Barcelona.

Avril also won four medals at the ICF Canoe Slalom World Championships with three silvers (C1 team: 1987, 1989, 1991) and one bronze (C1: 1991).

== World Cup individual podiums ==
Season	Date	Venue	Position	Event
1992	20 Jun 1992	Bourg St.-Maurice	2nd	C1

== Bibliography ==
- DatabaseOlympics.com
- Evans, Hilary; Gjerde, Arild; Heijmans, Jeroen; Mallon, Bill; et al. "Jacky Avril". Olympics at Sports-Reference.com. Sports Reference LLC. Archived from the original on 2011-07-15.
