= Florence Fernandes =

Portuguese canoeist

Florencia Sophie Sabine Lenne "Florence" Ferreira Fernandes (born 1 December 1968 in Lille) is a Portuguese slalom canoeist who competed from the mid-1990s to the mid-2000s (decade). She finished 22nd in the K-1 event at the 1996 Summer Olympics in Atlanta. Four years later in Sydney, Fernandes finished 20th after being eliminated in the qualifying round of the K-1 event.

== Sources ==
- Evans, Hilary; Gjerde, Arild; Heijmans, Jeroen; Mallon, Bill; et al. "Florence Fernandes". Olympics at Sports-Reference.com. Sports Reference LLC. Archived from the original on 2011-08-31.
