= Canoeing at the 1996 Summer Olympics – Men's slalom C-2 =

Men's slalom C-2 at the Games of the XXVI Olympiad
- Venue: Ocoee Whitewater Center
- Dates: 28 July 1996
- Competitors: 15 pairs from 10 nations

Medalists
1st place, gold medalist(s)		Franck Adisson; Wilfrid Forgues	France
2nd place, silver medalist(s)		Miroslav Šimek; Jiří Rohan	Czech Republic
3rd place, bronze medalist(s)		André Ehrenberg; Michael Senft	Germany

These are the results of the men's C-2 slalom competition in canoeing at the 1996 Summer Olympics. The C-2 (canoe single) event is raced by two-man canoes through a whitewater course. The venue for the 1996 Olympic competition was at the Toccoa/Ocoee River near the Georgia-Tennessee state line.

== Medalists ==
Gold	Silver	Bronze
Frank Adisson and Wilfrid Forgues (FRA)	Jiří Rohan and Miroslav Šimek (CZE)	André Ehrenberg and Michael Senft (GER)

== Results ==
The 15 teams each took two runs through the whitewater slalom course on July 28. The best time of the two runs counted for the event.

Rank	Name	Run 1			Run 2			Result
Rank	Name	Time	Points	Total	Time	Points	Total	Total
Gold	Frank Adisson & Wilfrid Forgues (FRA)	185.82	10	195.82	158.82	0	158.82	158.82
Silver	Miroslav Šimek & Jiří Rohan (CZE)	161.77	70	231.77	160.16	0	160.16	160.16
Bronze	André Ehrenberg & Michael Senft (GER)	162.33	5	167.33	158.72	5	163.72	163.72
4	Manfred Berro & Michael Trummer (GER)	165.55	15	180.55	163.72	0	163.72	163.72
5	Thierry Saïdi & Emmanuel del Rey (FRA)	168.43	5	173.43	160.47	5	165.47	165.47
6	Pavel Štercl & Petr Štercl (CZE)	163.45	5	168.45	179.53	160	339.53	168.45
7	Krzysztof Kołomański & Michał Staniszewski (POL)	163.78	10	173.78	164.95	5	169.95	169.95
8	Benoît Gauthier & François Letourneau (CAN)	164.83	15	179.83	167.67	5	172.67	172.67
9	Peter Matti & Ueli Matti (SUI)	181.31	5	186.31	168.67	5	173.67	173.67
10	Ľuboš Šoška & Peter Šoška (SVK)	179.90	5	184.90	170.38	5	175.38	175.38
11	Horace Holden & Wayne Dickert (USA)	174.69	50	224.69	175.90	5	180.90	180.90
12	Craig Brown & Stewart Pitt (GBR)	179.81	10	189.91	170.96	10	180.96	180.96
13	Roman Štrba & Roman Vajs (SVK)	174.40	20	194.40	175.67	25	200.67	194.40
14	Andrew Wilson & John Felton (AUS)	184.48	70	254.48	184.06	15	199.06	199.06
15	Andrzej Wójs & Sławomir Mordarski (POL)	201.51	25	226.51	193.07	20	213.07	213.07
