= Ľuboš Šoška =

Slovak slalom canoeist (born 1977)

Personal information
- Nationality: Slovak
- Born: 21 December 1977 (age 48) Žilina, Czechoslovakia
- Height: 1.88 m (6 ft 2 in)
- Weight: 73 kg (161 lb)

Sport
- Country: Slovakia
- Sport: Canoe slalom
- Event: C2
Medal record
Men's canoe slalom
Representing Slovakia
World Championships
| Bronze medal – third place | 2006 Prague | C2 team |
European Championships
| Bronze medal – third place | 1996 Augsburg | C2 team |

Ľuboš Šoška (born 21 December 1977) is a Slovak retired slalom canoeist who competed at the 1996 Summer Olympics in Atlanta.

== Biography ==
=== Early life and sports career ===
Ľuboš Šoška was born on 21 December 1977 in Žilina. As a canoeist, he competed internationally from 1996 to 2004, specializing in the C2 discipline where he was partnered by his older brother Peter Šoška.

The brothers a bronze medal in the C2 team event at the 2006 ICF Canoe Slalom World Championships in Prague. They also won a bronze medal in the same event at the 1996 European Championships in Augsburg.

Ľuboš and Peter competed at the 1996 Summer Olympics in Atlanta where they finished 10th in the C2 event.

=== Later life ===
After the end of his active sports career, Šoška ran a construction company and later became a manager of the music club Pink Whale in Bratislava. In 2025 he retired due to worsening pulmonary fibrosis.

== Career statistics ==
=== Major championships results timeline ===
| Event | | 1995 | 1996 | 1997 | 1998 | 1999 | 2000 | 2001 | 2002 | 2003 | 2004 | 2005 | 2006 |
|---|---|---|---|---|---|---|---|---|---|---|---|---|---|
| Olympic Games | C2 | Not held | 10 | Not held | | | — | Not held | | | — | Not held | |
| World Championships | C2 | 24 | Not held | 17 | Not held | — | Not held | | 12 | 12 | Not held | — | 16 |
| World Championships | C2 team | 4 | Not held | 4 | Not held | — | Not held | | — | 6 | Not held | — | 3 |
| European Championships | C2 | Not held | 7 | Not held | — | Not held | 12 | Not held | — | Not held | 4 | — | 17 |
| European Championships | C2 team | Not held | 3 | Not held | — | Not held | 2 (Note: Not a medal event due to low number of participating nations) | Not held | — | Not held | 2 | — | 5 |

=== World Cup individual podiums ===
| Season | Date | Venue | Position | Event |
|---|---|---|---|---|
| 1997 | 6 Jul 1997 | Bratislava | 3rd | C2 |

==
