= Michael Trummer =

German slalom canoeist (born 1962)

Medal record

Men's canoe slalom

Representing Germany

World Championships
| Bronze medal – third place | 1991 Tacen | C2 team |
| Bronze medal – third place | 1995 Nottingham | C2 team |
| Bronze medal – third place | 1997 Três Coroas | C2 team |

European Championships
| Gold medal – first place | 1996 Augsburg | C2 team |

Michael Trummer (born 31 May 1962 in Zeitz) is a German slalom canoeist who competed from the late 1980s to late 1990s. He won three bronze medals at the ICF Canoe Slalom World Championships in the C2 team event (1991, 1995, 1997). He also won a gold medal in the same event at the 1996 European Championships.

Competing in two Summer Olympics, he earned his best finish of fourth in the C2 event in Atlanta in 1996.

His partner in the boat throughout the whole of active his career was Manfred Berro.

== World Cup individual podiums ==
| Season | Datea | Venue | Position | Event |
|---|---|---|---|---|
| 1994 | 26 June 1994 | Nottingham | 2nd | C2 |
| 1994 | 17 July 1994 | La Seu d'Urgell | 3rd | C2 |
