= Salbris =

- Commune
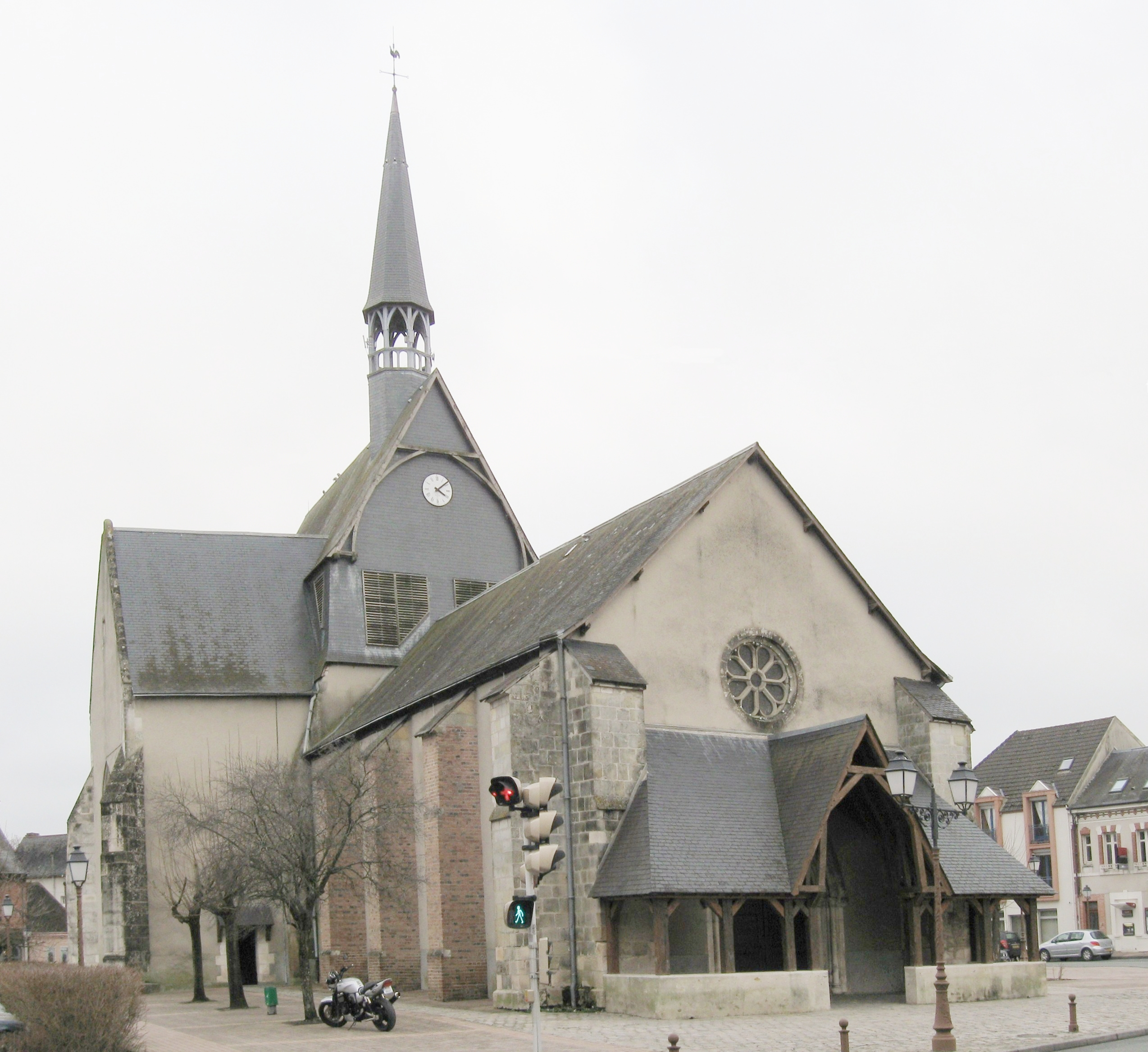
- Church of Saint-Georges

- Coat of arms
- Location of Salbris
- Location within France Location within Centre-Val de Loire
- Coordinates: 47°25′34″N 2°03′10″E
- Country: France
- Region: Centre-Val de Loire
- Department: Loir-et-Cher
- Arrondissement: Romorantin-Lanthenay
- Canton: La Sologne
- Intercommunality: La Sologne des rivières

Government
  - Mayor (2020–2026): Alexandre Avril
- Area^{1}: 106.61 km^{2} (41.16 sq mi)
- Highest elevation: 131 m (430 ft)
- Lowest elevation: 96 m (315 ft)
- Population (2023): 4,809
  - Density: 45.11/km^{2} (116.8/sq mi)
- Time zone: UTC+01:00 (CET)
  - Summer (DST): UTC+02:00 (CEST)
- INSEE/Postal code: 41232 /41300
- ^{1} French Land Register data, which excludes lakes, ponds, glaciers > 1 km^{2} (0.386 sq mi or 247 acres) and river estuaries.

Salbris (French pronunciation: [salbʁi]) is a commune in the Loir-et-Cher department in central France.

== Population ==
Historical population

Year	Pop.	±% p.a.
1793	1,254	—
1821	1,389	+0.37%
1846	1,704	+0.82%
1872	1,813	+0.24%
1901	2,813	+1.53%
1926	3,467	+0.84%
1946	3,932	+0.63%
1962	5,097	+1.64%
1968	5,451	+1.13%

Year	Pop.	±% p.a.
1975	6,095	+1.61%
1982	6,079	−0.04%
1990	6,083	+0.01%
1999	6,029	−0.10%
2007	5,766	−0.56%
2012	5,621	−0.51%
2017	5,166	−1.67%
2023	4,809	−1.19%

Source: EHESS and INSEE (1968-2023)

== See also ==
- Sologne
- Communes of the Loir-et-Cher department
