= Craig Brown (canoeist) =

British slalom canoeist

Craig Brown (born 12 May 1971 in Kitwe, Zambia) is a British slalom canoeist who competed from the mid-1990s to the early 2000s. He finished 12th in the C-2 event at the 1996 Summer Olympics in Atlanta. He now lives near Nottingham with his wife and two children.

Canoe slalom runs in Craig Brown's family. His father is SCA development coach John Brown who has coached other Olympic athletes including silver medallist Campbell Walsh (Athens 2004). Additionally, his younger brother Michael Brown, born 25 May 1996, has competed at the Junior European Championships and World Championships (2012) and in July 2013 will be competing in the U23 World Championships in Liptovsky, Slovakia.
