= Stewart Pitt =

British canoeist

Stewart Pitt (born 19 March 1968 in Ayr) is a British slalom canoeist who competed in the late 1980s and in 1990s. He finished 12th in the C-2 event at the 1996 Summer Olympics in Atlanta. He is 12 times Scottish Champion and winner of World Masters Games C2 slalom event in Sydney Australia October 2009.
