= Grzegorz Sarata =

Polish canoeist (born 1970)

Grzegorz Wicenty Sarata (born 7 December 1970 in Szczawnica) is a Polish slalom canoer who competed from the late 1980s to the mid-1990s. He finished 13th in the C-1 event at the 1992 Summer Olympics in Barcelona.
