= Jan Petříček =

Czechoslovak slalom canoeist (born 1967)

Medal record

Men's canoe slalom

Representing Czechoslovakia

World Championships
Silver medal – second place	1989 Savage River	C2
Silver medal – second place	1989 Savage River	C2 team

Jan Petříček (born 18 May 1967 in Žatec) is a Czechoslovak slalom canoeist who competed in the late 1980s and early 1990s. He won two silver medals at the 1989 ICF Canoe Slalom World Championships in Savage River, Maryland in the United States, earning them in the C2 event and the C2 team event.

Petříček also finished seventh in the C2 event at the 1992 Summer Olympics in Barcelona.

His partner in the boat throughout the whole of his career was Tomáš Petříček.

== World Cup individual podiums ==
Season	Date	Venue	Position	Event
1988	19 June 1988	Wausau	1st	C2
1990	1 Jul 1990	Wausau	3rd	C2
1992	16 Feb 1992	Murupara	3rd	C2
1992	23 Feb 1992	Launceston	3rd	C2
1992	7 Jun 1992	Merano	1st	C2
