= Berro =

Berro is a surname. Notable people with the surname include:

- Bernardo Berro (1803–1868), Uruguayan politician and President of Uruguay
- Manfred Berro (born 1966), German slalom canoeist

== See also ==
- Isabelle Berro-Lefèvre (born 1965), Monegasque judge
