= Eadaoin Ní Challarain =

Irish slalom canoer

Eadaoin Ní Challarain (born 19 September 1975 in Spiddal) is an Irish slalom canoer who competed in two Olympic Games. She finished 18th in the K-1 event at the 2000 Summer Olympics in Sydney. Four years later in Athens she finished in 11th place in the same event. She also competed in Freestyle Kayaking.
