= Nada Mali =

Slovenian canoeist (born 1979)

Nada Mali (born 21 October 1979 in Borovnica, Yugoslavia, now Slovenia) is a Slovenian slalom canoer who competed from the mid-1990s to the mid-2000s. Competing in two Summer Olympics, she earned her best finish of 17th in the K-1 event at the 2000 Summer Olympics in Sydney, but did not advance beyond the qualifying round in either Olympics she competed, the other being the 2004 Summer Olympics in Athens. She finished 19th, and last, in the K-1 event in 2004. As of 2004, she was 5 feet and 9 inches tall (176 cm) and weighed 137 pounds (62 kg.)
