= Brigitte Guibal =

French canoeist

Medal record

Women's canoe slalom

Representing France

Olympic Games
| Silver medal – second place | 2000 Sydney | K1 |

World Championships
| Gold medal – first place | 1997 Três Coroas | K1 |
| Silver medal – second place | 1997 Três Coroas | K1 team |

European Championships
| Silver medal – second place | 2000 Mezzana | K1 |

Brigitte Guibal (born 15 February 1971 in Mende, Lozère) is a French slalom canoeist who competed from the early 1990s to the early 2000s. She won the silver medal in the K1 event at the 2000 Summer Olympics in Sydney.

Guibal also won two medals at the 1997 ICF Canoe Slalom World Championships in Três Coroas with a gold in the K1 and a silver in the K1 team event. She also won a silver medal in the K1 event at the 2000 European Championships in Mezzana.

== World Cup individual podiums ==
| Season | Date | Venue | Position | Event |
|---|---|---|---|---|
| 1995 | 16 Jul 1995 | Lofer | 3rd | K1 |
| 1996 | 29 Sep 1996 | Três Coroas | 2nd | K1 |
| 1997 | 28 Jul 1997 | Ocoee | 1st | K1 |
| 1998 | 21 Jun 1998 | Tacen | 1st | K1 |
| 2000 | 2 Jul 2000 | Saint-Pé-de-Bigorre | 1st | K1 |
| 2000 | 9 Jul 2000 | La Seu d'Urgell | 3rd | K1 |
