= Jakub Prüher =

Czechoslovak-Czech slalom canoeist (born 1968)

Jakub Prüher (born January 2, 1968, in České Budějovice) is a Czechoslovak-Czech slalom canoeist who competed from the mid-1980s to the mid-1990s. He finished 29th in the C1 event at the 1992 Summer Olympics in Barcelona.

== World Cup individual podiums ==
Season	Date	Venue	Position	Event
1992	23 Feb 1992	Launceston	2nd	C1
