= Agulhon =

Agulhon is a surname. Notable people with the surname include:

- Marianne Agulhon (born 19 March 1966), French slalom canoeist
- Maurice Agulhon (20 December 1926 – 28 May 2014), French historian
