= Bäsna =

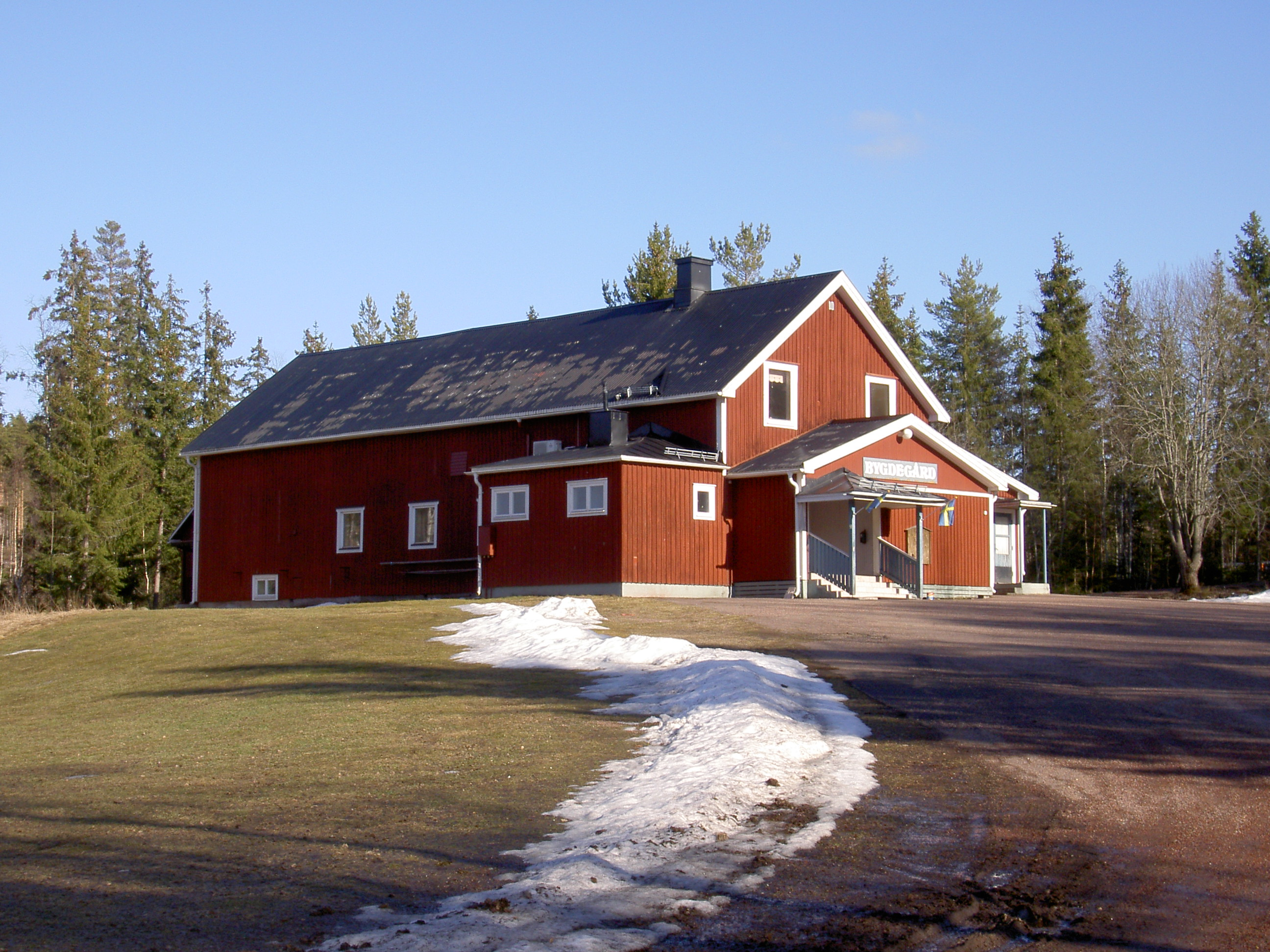
- Bäsna community center

- Location within Dalarna Location within Sweden
- Coordinates: 60°32′N 15°12′E
- Country: Sweden
- Province: Dalarna
- County: Dalarna County
- Municipality: Gagnef Municipality

Area
  - Total: 1.5 km^{2} (0.58 sq mi)

Population (24 October 2019)
  - Total: 665
  - Density: 443/km^{2} (1,150/sq mi)
- Time zone: UTC+1 (CET)
  - Summer (DST): UTC+2 (CEST)
- Climate: Dfc

Bäsna (Swedish pronunciation: [ˈbɛ̂ːsna]) is a locality situated in Gagnef Municipality, Dalarna County, Sweden, with a population of 665 in 2019. It dates back to the Middle Ages.
