= Renato de Monti =

Italian canoeist

Medal record

Men's canoe slalom

Representing Italy

World Championships
Bronze medal – third place	1993 Mezzana	C1 team

Renato de Monti (born 3 March 1960 in Merano) is an Italian slalom canoeist who competed from the early 1980s to the mid-1990s. He won a bronze medal in the C1 team event at the 1993 ICF Canoe Slalom World Championships in Mezzana.

Monti also competed in two Summer Olympics, earning his best finish of fifth in the C1 event in Barcelona in 1992.

== World Cup individual podiums ==
Season	Date	Venue	Position	Event
1992	31 May 1992	Nottingham	2nd	C1
