= Kordula Striepecke =

German slalom canoeist

Medal record

Women's canoe slalom

Representing Germany

World Championships
| Gold medal – first place | 1997 Três Coroas | K1 team |
| Bronze medal – third place | 1991 Tacen | K1 |
| Bronze medal – third place | 1995 Nottingham | K1 |
| Bronze medal – third place | 1995 Nottingham | K1 team |

European Championships
| Silver medal – second place | 1996 Augsburg | K1 team |
| Bronze medal – third place | 1998 Roudnice nad Labem | K1 team |

Kordula Striepecke (born 25 April 1963 in Erfurt) is a German slalom canoeist who competed from the late 1980s to the late 1990s. She won four medals at the ICF Canoe Slalom World Championships with a gold (K1 team: 1997) and three bronzes (K1: 1991, 1995; K1 team: 1995).

Striepecke also competed in two Summer Olympics, earning her best finish of sixth in the K1 event in Barcelona in 1992.

She won the overall World Cup title in 1993. She also earned 2 medals at the European Championships (1 silver and 1 bronze).

== World Cup individual podiums ==
| | 1st place, gold medalist(s) | 2nd place, silver medalist(s) | 3rd place, bronze medalist(s) | Total |
| K1 | 2 | 5 | 5 | 12 |

| Season | Date | Venue | Position | Event |
|---|---|---|---|---|
| 1990 | 12 August 1990 | Augsburg | 2nd | K1 |
| 1991 | 30 June 1991 | Mezzana | 3rd | K1 |
| 1992 | 16 February 1992 | Murupara | 3rd | K1 |
| 1993 | 1 August 1993 | Augsburg | 2nd | K1 |
| 1993 | 21 August 1993 | Minden | 2nd | K1 |
| 1993 | 31 August 1993 | Ocoee | 1st | K1 |
| 1994 | 3 July 1994 | Augsburg | 3rd | K1 |
| 1994 | 18 September 1994 | Asahi, Aichi | 2nd | K1 |
| 1995 | 2 July 1995 | Tacen | 1st | K1 |
| 1996 | 21 April 1996 | Ocoee | 3rd | K1 |
| 1997 | 6 July 1997 | Bratislava | 3rd | K1 |
| 1998 | 28 June 1998 | Augsburg | 2nd | K1 |
