= Kent Ford (canoeist) =

American canoeist

Medal record

Men's canoe slalom

Representing United States

World Championships
Gold medal – first place	1983 Meran	C1 team
Gold medal – first place	1985 Augsburg	C1 team

Kent Ford (born 1957) is a former American slalom canoeist who competed from the late 1970s to the early 1990s.

He won two gold medals in the C1 team event at the ICF Canoe Slalom World Championships, earning them in 1983 and 1985.

== World Cup individual podiums ==
Season	Date	Venue	Position	Event
1992	16 Feb 1992	Murupara	3rd	C1
