= Gareth Marriott =

British slalom canoeist (born 1970)

Medal record

Men's canoe slalom

Representing Great Britain

Olympic Games
Silver medal – second place	1992 Barcelona	C1

World Championships
Silver medal – second place	1993 Mezzanna	C1 team
Bronze medal – third place	1991 Tacen	C1 team
Bronze medal – third place	1997 Três Coroas	C1

Junior World Championships
Gold medal – first place	1988 La Seu d'Urgell	C1

Gareth John Marriott (born 14 July 1970 in Mansfield) is a British slalom canoeist who competed at the international level from 1986 to 1997.

Competing in two Summer Olympics, he won a silver medal in the C1 event at Barcelona in 1992 and finished 4th in the C1 event at Atlanta in 1996

Marriott also won three medals at the ICF Canoe Slalom World Championships with a silver (C1 team: 1993) and two bronzes (C1: 1997, C1 team: 1991).

He won the overall World Cup title three times in the C1 class (1991, 1994 and 1995).

== World Cup individual podiums ==
	1st place, gold medalist(s)	2nd place, silver medalist(s)	3rd place, bronze medalist(s)	Total
C1	8	5	2	15

Season	Date	Venue	Position	Event
1989	20 August 1989	Tacen	3rd	C1
1990	1990	Savage River	2nd	C1
1991	30 June 1991	Mezzana	1st	C1
1991	25 August 1991	Minden	1st	C1
1991	1 September 1991	Wausau	2nd	C1
1992	31 May 1992	Nottingham	3rd	C1
1992	20 June 1992	Bourg St.-Maurice	1st	C1
1993	31 August 1993	Ocoee	2nd	C1
1994	26 June 1994	Nottingham	2nd	C1
1994	3 July 1994	Augsburg	2nd	C1
1994	10 July 1994	Bourg St.-Maurice	1st	C1
1994	18 September 1994	Asahi, Aichi	1st	C1
1995	9 July 1995	Mezzana	1st	C1
1995	1 October 1995	Ocoee	1st	C1
1997	28 July 1997	Ocoee	1st	C1
