= Zbigniew Miązek =

Polish canoeist (born 1966)

Zbigniew Stanisław Miązek (born 9 January 1966 in Drzewica) is a Polish slalom canoeist who competed from the late 1980s to the mid-1990s. He finished 15th in the C-1 event at the 1992 Summer Olympics in Barcelona.
