= S2o design and engineering =

Engineering company in Colorado, United States

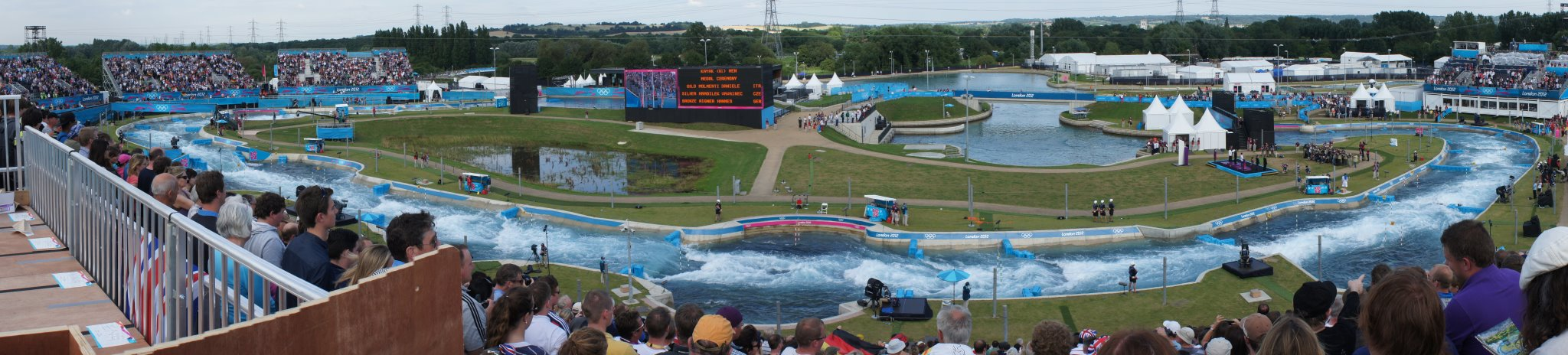
The 2012 London Olympic Park

S2o Design and Engineering were the detailed designers of the London 2012 whitewater venue. The selection of this team to design the Olympic venue was unique because the designer was a former Olympic competitor ('92, '96, '00) who started a firm to design whitewater parks after receiving a degree in Engineering. The company was started in 2003 by Scott Shipley. Scott Shipley is a registered professional engineer who was formerly a World Cup Slalom Champion and World Silver Medalist in both freestyle kayaking and slalom kayaking.

S2o Design and Engineering worked with Engineering Paddler Designs to create the Rapidblocs Obstacle system. The system is currently patent pending and was used in the design of the London 2012 whitewater venue at the Lee Valley White Water Centre. In 2023, S2o Design and Engineering was acquired by Calibre Engineering, Inc.
