= Dala-Floda =

Floda
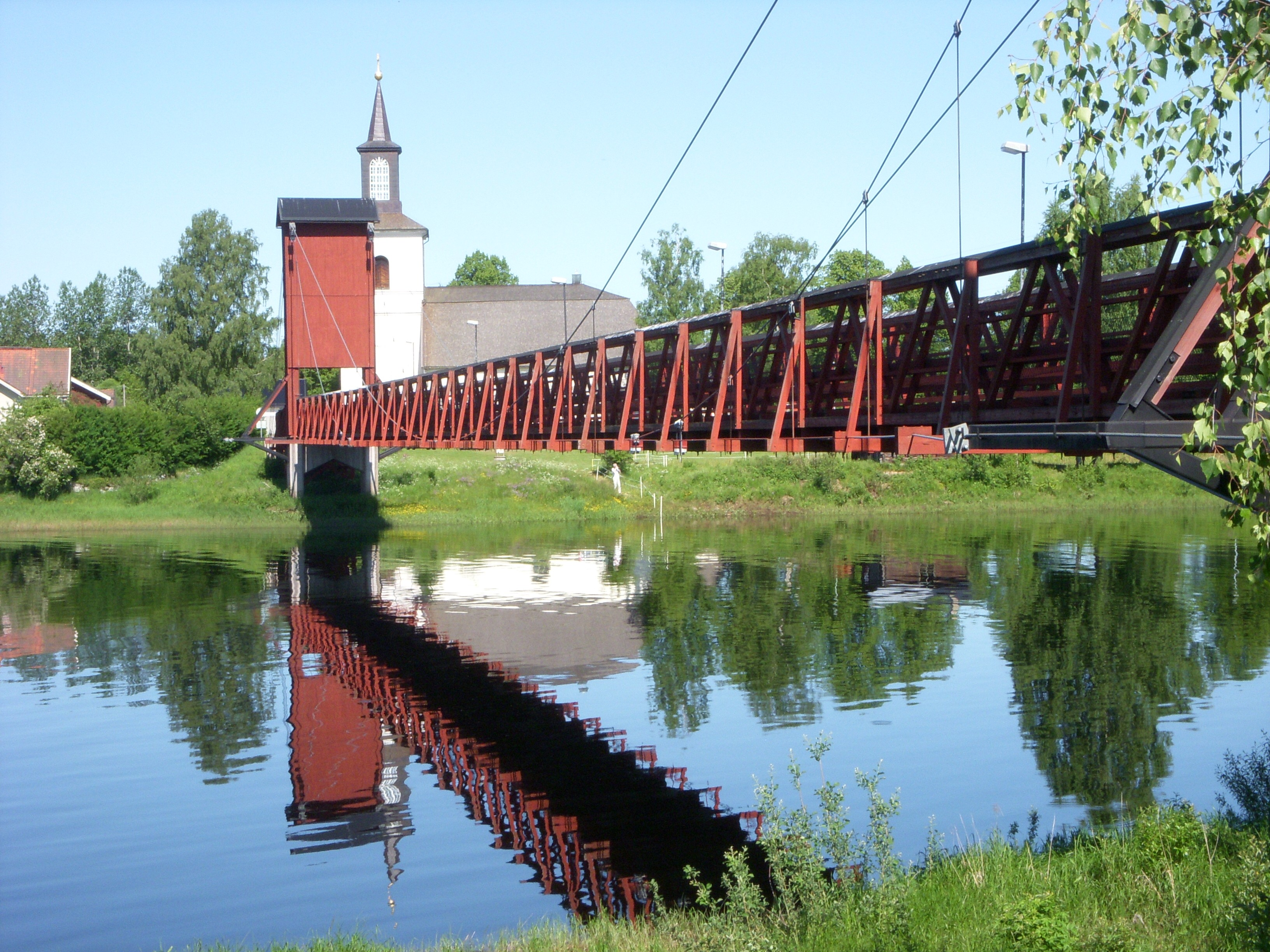
- Suspension bridge in Dala-Floda

- Location within Dalarna Location within Sweden
- Coordinates: 60°30′N 14°46′E
- Country: Sweden
- Province: Dalarna
- County: Dalarna County
- Municipality: Gagnef Municipality

Area
  - Total: 1.97 km^{2} (0.76 sq mi)

Population (31 December 2010)
  - Total: 680
  - Density: 346/km^{2} (900/sq mi)
- Time zone: UTC+1 (CET)
  - Summer (DST): UTC+2 (CEST)
- Climate: Dfc

Dala-Floda or Floda is a locality situated in Gagnef Municipality, Dalarna County, Sweden with 680 inhabitants in 2010.

Dala-Floda is a small village, with a few shops and a reasonably sized park.

Measuring 158 meters in length, the Kyrkbron bridge in Dala-Floda is recognized as Sweden's longest wooden suspension bridge. Erected in 1922 as a replacement for a log bridge lost to the 1916 flood, the wooden structure was later destroyed by fire in 1980. It was, however, re-established and formally inaugurated by the royal couple on May 18, 1983.
