= Danko Herceg =

Croatian canoeist

Medal record

Men's canoe slalom

Representing Yugoslavia

Junior World Championships
Gold medal – first place	1990 Tavanasa	C1
Silver medal – second place	1990 Tavanasa	C1 team

Representing Croatia

World Championships
Silver medal – second place	1995 Nottingham	C1 team

Danko Herceg (born 30 August 1974 in Zagreb) is a Croatian slalom canoeist who competed at the international level from 1990 to 2010.

He was junior world champion in 1990 and he won a silver medal in the C1 team event at the 1995 ICF Canoe Slalom World Championships in Nottingham. He was ranked 3rd in the overall World Cup standings in 1994 and 1995. Herceg also competed in four Summer Olympics, earning his best finish of ninth in the C1 event in Barcelona in 1992.

== World Cup individual podiums ==
Season	Date	Venue	Position	Event
1992	7 Jun 1992	Merano	1st	C1
1992	20 Jun 1992	Bourg St.-Maurice	3rd	C1
1994	26 Jun 1994	Nottingham	1st	C1
1994	10 Jul 1994	Bourg St.-Maurice	2nd	C1
1994	17 Jul 1994	La Seu d'Urgell	3rd	C1
1995	25 Jun 1995	Prague	1st	C1
1995	16 Jul 1995	Lofer	3rd	C1
1997	22 Jun 1997	Bourg St.-Maurice	3rd	C1
2001	27 May 2001	Goumois	3rd	C1
