= Pere Guerrero =

Spanish canoeist

Pere Guerrero Torrecilla (born June 5, 1973 in La Seu d'Urgell) is a Spanish slalom canoeist who competed in the 1990s. He finished 28th in the C1 event at the 1992 Summer Olympics in Barcelona.

== World Cup individual podiums ==
Season	Date	Venue	Position	Event
1993	18 Jul 1993	La Seu d'Urgell	3rd	C1
