= Daniel Norman =

Canadian slalom canoer (born 1964)

Daniel Andrew "Dan" Norman (born September 29, 1964 in Toronto) is a Canadian slalom canoer who competed in the early-to-mid 1990s. He finished 30th in the C-1 event at the 1992 Summer Olympics in Barcelona. Norman now teaches outdoor pursuits and mathematics at Brentwood College School in Mill Bay, British Columbia.
