= Horace Holden =

American canoeist (born 1963)

Horace P. Holden, Jr. (born May 24, 1963, in Atlanta) is an American slalom canoer who competed in the mid-1990s. He finished 11th in the C-2 event at the 1996 Summer Olympics in Atlanta.
