= Andrew Raspin =

British slalom canoeist (born 1969)

Medal record

Men's canoe slalom

Representing Great Britain

World Championships
| Bronze medal – third place | 1995 Nottingham | K1 team |

European Championships
| Bronze medal – third place | 1998 Roudnice nad Labem | K1 |

Andrew Raspin (born 1969) is a British slalom canoeist who competed in the 1990s.

== Early life ==
His older brother Ian Raspin is also a slalom canoeist.

Like his brother he attended Trent Polytechnic. He came from Skelton-in-Cleveland.

== Career ==
He won a bronze medal in the K-1 team event at the 1995 ICF Canoe Slalom World Championships in Nottingham. He also won a bronze medal in the K1 event at the 1998 European Championships in Roudnice nad Labem.
