= Lynn Simpson =

British slalom canoeist (born 1971)

Personal information
- Nationality: British
- Born: 16 February 1971 (age 55) Scarborough, North Riding of Yorkshire, England

Sport
- Sport: canoe slalom
- Event: K1
Medal record
Women's canoe slalom
Representing Great Britain
World Championships
Gold medal – first place	1995 Nottingham	K1
Silver medal – second place	1995 Nottingham	K1 team
Bronze medal – third place	1993 Mezzana	K1 team
Bronze medal – third place	1997 Três Coroas	K1 team

Lynn Simpson (Lynn Reys) (born 16 February 1971 in Scarborough, North Riding of Yorkshire) is a British slalom canoeist who competed from the late 1980s to the late 1990s.

== Early life ==
She grew up on Wesley Close in South Cave. The local village raised money for her, and the local county council gave her a grant of £1,000, and by local companies.

She attended South Hunsley School. From the University of Nottingham she gained a 2.1 in Economics in 1994. She was the Sunday Times Sportswoman of the Year 1995.

== Career ==
She won four medals at the ICF Canoe Slalom World Championships with a gold (K1: 1995), a silver (K1 team: 1995), and two bronzes (K1 team: 1993, 1997). She also won the World Cup series in three consecutive seasons between 1994 and 1996.

Simpson also competed in two Summer Olympics, earning her best finish of tenth in the K1 event in Barcelona in 1992.

Post retirement Lynn now coaches youth paddlers at the northern german canoe powerhouse Stortebeker padelsport club alongside her husband and former bbc TV paddles up champion Mickel Reys in the city of Bremen.

Lynn also appeared numerous times on BBC's Question of Sport, including the 1995 Christmas special with contestant Gordon Strachan, Prince Nassim Hamed, and Roger Black.

== World Cup individual podiums ==
	1st place, gold medalist(s)	2nd place, silver medalist(s)	3rd place, bronze medalist(s)	Total
K1	10	1	1	12

Season	Date	Venue	Position	Event
1993	18 July 1993	La Seu d'Urgell	1st	K1
1993	25 July 1993	Lofer	1st	K1
1993	21 August 1993	Minden	1st	K1
1994	26 June 1994	Nottingham	3rd	K1
1994	3 July 1994	Augsburg	1st	K1
1994	18 September 1994	Asahi, Aichi	1st	K1
1995	9 July 1995	Mezzana	1st	K1
1995	16 July 1995	Lofer	2nd	K1
1995	1 October 1995	Ocoee	1st	K1
1996	9 June 1996	La Seu d'Urgell	1st	K1
1996	29 September 1996	Três Coroas	1st	K1
1997	6 July 1997	Bratislava	1st	K1
