= Andrew Wilson (canoeist) =

Australian slalom canoeist (born 1964)

Andrew Thomas Wilson (born 1 August 1964) is an Australian slalom canoeist who competed from the mid-1980s to the late 1990s. Competing in two Summer Olympics, he earned his best finish of 14th in the C-2 event in Atlanta in 1996.

In 2014, Wilson completed the Bachelor of Medicine degree at the University of Newcastle.
