= Roman Štrba =

Slovak slalom canoeist (born 1974)

Personal information
- Nationality: Slovak
- Born: 8 March 1974 (age 52) Liptovský Mikuláš, Czechoslovakia
- Height: 1.75 m (5 ft 9 in)
- Weight: 67 kg (148 lb)

Sport
- Country: Slovakia
- Sport: Canoe slalom
- Event: C2
Medal record
Men's canoe slalom
Representing Czechoslovakia
Junior World Championships
Gold medal – first place	1992 Sjoa	C2
Representing Slovakia
World Championships
Silver medal – second place	1999 La Seu d'Urgell	C2 team
Bronze medal – third place	1993 Mezzana	C2 team
European Championships
Silver medal – second place	1998 Roudnice nad Labem	C2 team
Bronze medal – third place	1996 Augsburg	C2 team

Roman Štrba (born 8 March 1974 in Liptovský Mikuláš) is a retired Slovak slalom canoeist who competed at the international level from 1990 to 2000, specializing in the C2 discipline.

Štrba won two medals in the C2 team event at the ICF Canoe Slalom World Championships with a silver in 1999 and a bronze in 1993. He won the overall World Cup title in the C2 class in 1998, he also won 2 medals at the European Championships (1 silver and 1 bronze).

Štrba finished 13th in the C2 event at the 1996 Summer Olympics in Atlanta.

His partner in the C2 boat throughout the whole of his active career was Roman Vajs.

== Career statistics ==
=== Major championships results timeline ===
Event		1993	1994	1995	1996	1997	1998	1999	2000
Olympic Games	C2	Not held			13	Not held			—
World Championships	C2	12	Not held	9	Not held	9	Not held	18	Not held
World Championships	C2 team	3	Not held	4	Not held	4	Not held	2	Not held
European Championships	C2	Not held			6	Not held	13	Not held	7
European Championships	C2 team	Not held			3	Not held	2	Not held	2 (Note: Not a medal event due to low number of participating nations)

=== World Cup individual podiums ===
Season	Date	Venue	Position	Event
1995	2 Jul 1995	Tacen	3rd	C2
1998	21 Jun 1998	Tacen	2nd	C2
1998	13 Sep 1998	La Seu d'Urgell	1st	C2
1999	24 Jun 1999	Tacen	3rd	C2
1999	15 Aug 1999	Bratislava	3rd	C2

== Paralysis ==
On March 29, 2001, a defunct 36-meter tall chimney in Liptovský Mikuláš collapsed under Štrba. He survived the fall, but it left him completely paralyzed.
