= Margaret Langford =

Canadian slalom canoeist (born 1970)

Margaret Louise Langford (born 18 July 1970 in Vancouver, British Columbia) is a Canadian slalom canoeist who competed from the late 1980s to the mid-2000s (decade). Competing in four Summer Olympics, she earned her best finish of eighth in the K1 event in Atlanta in 1996.

== World Cup individual podiums ==
Season	Date	Venue	Position	Event
1997	29 Jun 1997	Björbo	3rd	K1
1998	2 Aug 1998	Wausau	2nd	K1
2001	3 Jun 2001	Merano	2nd	K1
2003	6 Jul 2003	La Seu d'Urgell	3rd	K1
