= Wayne Dickert =

American slalom canoer

Wayne Lewis Dickert (born December 8, 1958) is an American slalom canoer who competed in the mid-1990s. He finished 11th in the C-2 event at the 1996 Summer Olympics in Atlanta.

== Works ==
- Wayne Dickert, Jon Rounds, Skip Brown (photo), Roberto Sabas (illus.), Basic Kayaking: All the Skills and Gear You Need to Get Started, 2005. Winner of the 2005 National Outdoor Book Award (Instructional).
- Jon Rounds, Wayne Dickert, Skip Brown (photo), Taina Litwak (illus.), Basic Canoeing: All the Skills and Tools You Need to Get Started. Winner of the 2003 National Outdoor Book Award (Instructional).
