= Martin Lang (canoeist) =

German canoeist (born 1968)

Medal record

Men's canoe slalom

Representing Germany

World Championships
Gold medal – first place	1991 Tacen	C1
Gold medal – first place	1993 Mezzana	C1
Gold medal – first place	1995 Nottingham	C1 team
Silver medal – second place	1999 La Seu d'Urgell	C1 team

European Championships
Gold medal – first place	1996 Augsburg	C1 team
Silver medal – second place	1998 Roudnice nad Labem	C1 team
Bronze medal – third place	1996 Augsburg	C1

Martin Lang (born 14 June 1968 in Saarbrücken) is a German slalom canoeist who competed from the mid-1980s to the early 2000s. He won four medals at the ICF Canoe Slalom World Championships with three golds (C1: 1991, 1993; C1 team: 1995) and a silver (C1 team: 1999).

Lang also competed in two Summer Olympics, earning his best finish of sixth in the C1 event at Barcelona in 1992.

He won the overall World Cup title in the C1 category in 1992. He also earned three medals at the European Championships (1 gold, 1 silver and 1 bronze).

== World Cup individual podiums ==
	1st place, gold medalist(s)	2nd place, silver medalist(s)	3rd place, bronze medalist(s)	Total
C1	4	5	2	11

Season	Date	Venue	Position	Event
1990	25 August 1990	Tacen	1st	C1
1991	7 July 1991	Augsburg	2nd	C1
1991	10 July 1991	Reals	1st	C1
1992	16 February 1992	Murupara	2nd	C1
1992	31 May 1992	Nottingham	1st	C1
1992	7 June 1992	Merano	3rd	C1
1993	25 July 1993	Lofer	2nd	C1
1995	25 June 1995	Prague	2nd	C1
1995	1 October 1995	Ocoee	2nd	C1
1996	16 June 1996	Augsburg	1st	C1
1997	6 July 1997	Bratislava	3rd	C1
