= Danielle Woodward =

Australian canoeist

Danielle Woodward OAM APM
Personal information
- Born: Danielle Anne Woodward; 20 March 1965 (age 61) Melbourne, Australia
Medal record
Women's canoe slalom
Representing Australia
Olympic Games
Silver medal – second place	1992 Barcelona	K1

Danielle Anne Woodward (born 20 March 1965 in Melbourne) is an Australian slalom canoeist who competed from the mid-1980s to the early 2000s. Competing in three Summer Olympics, she won a silver medal in the K1 event at the 1992 Summer Olympics in Barcelona.

Woodward was born in Burwood in Melbourne's eastern suburbs and grew up in Newtown in New South Wales.

At the time of the 1992 Summer Olympics, she was a Detective Constable with the Australian Federal Police, and by 2024, she had been promoted to Commander.

In March 2016, Woodward was awarded the Commissioner's Medal for Innovation, recognising her dedication to combating human trafficking, particularly in creating and delivering awareness packages for front-line police across Australia.

Woodward was awarded the Medal of the Order of Australia (OAM) on Australia Day 2002 and the Australian Sports Medal on 22 June 2000.

In the 2020 Australia Day Honours List, Woodward was awarded the Australian Police Medal (APM).

Woodward was appointed director of Australian Canoeing on 29 April 2007. On 15 November 2008, she was elected president of the governing body.

In 2013, Woodward was appointed to the Australian Olympic Committee Executive. From 2014 onwards, she also worked administratively with the Australian Winter Olympic team, the Oceania Canoe Association and the International Canoe Federation.

In 2016, she was awarded the AIS Ward of Excellence - Administrator Australian Institute of Sport Performance Awards. and served as the Deputy Chef de Mission in Rio with the Australian Olympic Team.

During her AFP career, she served with the United Nations Police as the District Commander (7th Contingent UNTAET, East Timor), and a FILO Forward Commander (Downing of Flight MH17, The Hague). In 2019, Woodward was a Visiting Fellow at the Royal New Zealand Police College.

In November 2023, Woodward was charged with a drink driving offence and stood down from her AFP duties. After 38 years of exemplary service in the AFP, she retired in March 2024. In April 2024, Woodward received a non-conviction order and was banned from driving for six months after the magistrate concluded that the incident was the result of ill-health.

== World Cup individual podiums ==
Season	Date	Venue	Position	Event
1994	17 Jul 1994	La Seu d'Urgell	1st	K1
1995	25 Jun 1995	Prague	3rd	K1
