= Björbo =

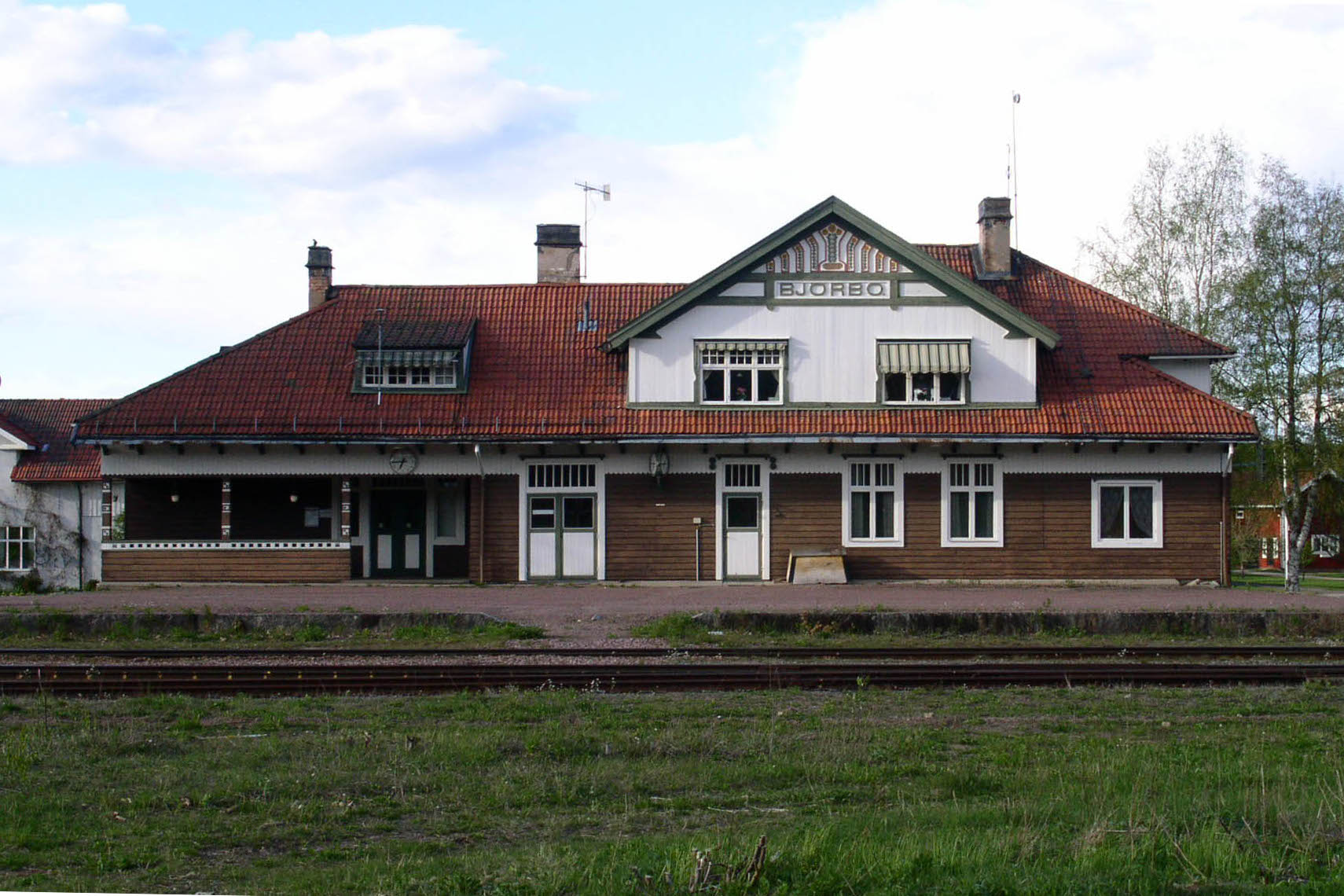
- Björbo railway station

- Location within Dalarna Location within Sweden
- Coordinates: 60°27′N 14°44′E
- Country: Sweden
- Province: Dalarna
- County: Dalarna County
- Municipality: Gagnef Municipality

Area
  - Total: 1.84 km^{2} (0.71 sq mi)

Population (31 December 2010)
  - Total: 697
  - Density: 379/km^{2} (980/sq mi)
- Time zone: UTC+1 (CET)
  - Summer (DST): UTC+2 (CEST)
- Climate: Dfc

Björbo is a locality situated in Gagnef Municipality, Dalarna County, Sweden with 697 inhabitants in 2010.
