= List of flag bearers for North Macedonia at the Olympics =

North Macedonia at the Olympics
- Flag of North Macedonia
- IOC code: MKD
- NOC: Olympic Committee of North Macedonia
- Website: www.mok.org.mk (in Macedonian)
- Medals: Gold 0 Silver 1 Bronze 1 Total 2

Summer appearances
- 1996; 2000; 2004; 2008; 2012; 2016; 2020; 2024

Winter appearances
- 1998; 2002; 2006; 2010; 2014; 2018; 2022; 2026

Other related appearances
- Yugoslavia (1920–1988); Independent Olympic Participants (1992)

This is a list of flag bearers who have represented North Macedonia at the Olympics.

Flag bearers carry the national flag of their country at the opening ceremony of the Olympic Games.

#	Event year	Season	Flag bearer	Sport
1	1996	Summer	Vladimir Bogoevski	Official
2	1998	Winter	Gjoko Dineski	Cross-country skiing
3	2000	Summer	Lazar Popovski	Canoeing
4	2002	Winter	Jana Nikolovska	Alpine skiing
5	2004	Summer	Blagoja Georgievski	Basketball (referee)
6	2006	Winter	Gjorgji Markovski	Alpine skiing
7	2008	Summer	Atanas Nikolovski	Canoeing
8	2010	Winter	Antonio Ristevski	Alpine skiing
9	2012	Summer	Marko Blaževski	Swimming
10	2014	Winter	Darko Damjanovski	Cross-country skiing
11	2016	Summer	Anastasia Bogdanovski	Swimming
12	2018	Winter	Stavre Jada	Cross-country skiing
13	2020	Summer	Dejan Georgievski	Taekwondo
13	2020	Summer	Arbresha Rexhepi	Judo
14	2022	Winter	Dardan Dehari	Alpine skiing
15	2024	Summer	Dario Ivanovski	Athletics
15	2024	Summer	Miljana Reljiḱ	Taekwondo

== See also ==
- North Macedonia at the Olympics
- List of flag bearers for Yugoslavia at the Olympics
