= Macedonia at the 1996 Summer Olympics =

- Flag of the Republic of Macedonia
- IOC code: MKD
- NOC: Olympic Committee of North Macedonia
- Website: www.mok.org.mk (in Macedonian)

in Atlanta
- Competitors: 11 (8 men and 3 women) in 4 sports
- Flag bearer: Vladimir Bogoevski
- Medals: Gold 0 Silver 0 Bronze 0 Total 0

Summer Olympics appearances (overview)
- 1996; 2000; 2004; 2008; 2012; 2016; 2020; 2024; 2028

Other related appearances
- Yugoslavia (1920–1988); Independent Olympic Participants (1992)

FYR Macedonia was represented at the 1996 Summer Olympics in Atlanta, Georgia, United States by the Olympic Committee of the Former Yugoslav Republic Macedonia.

It was the first appearance of the nation at the Olympic Games after it seceded from Yugoslavia in 1991. In total, 11 athletes including eight men and three women represented FYR Macedonia in four sports including canoeing, shooting, swimming and wrestling.

== Competitors ==
In total, 11 athletes represented FYR Macedonia at the 1996 Summer Olympics in Atlanta, Georgia, United States in four sports.

Sport	Men	Women	Total
Canoeing	2	1	3
Shooting	1	0	1
Swimming	2	2	4
Wrestling	3	0	3
Total	8	3	11

== Canoeing ==
Three Macedonian athletes participated in the canoeing events – Lazar Popovski, Nenad Trpovski and Ana Ugrinovska.

The men's slalom C-1 took place on 27 July 1996. Trpovski completed his first run in three minutes 11.19 seconds with 125 penalty seconds added, for a total time of five minutes 16.19 seconds. He did not finish his second run and finished 30th overall.

The women's slalom K-1 also took place on 27 July 1996. Ugrinovska completed her first run in four minutes 21.93 seconds with 85 penalty seconds added, for a total time five minutes 46.93 seconds. She did not improve in her second run finishing in four minutes 27.81 seconds with 105 penalty seconds added, for a total time of six minutes 12.81 seconds and finished 29th overall.

The men's slalom K-1 took place on 28 July 1996. Popovski completed his first run in two minutes 39.53 seconds with no penalty seconds added. He improved in his second run finishing in two minutes 38.3 seconds with no penalty seconds added and finished 29th overall.

Men

Athlete	Event	Total	Rank
Nenad Trpovski	Slalom C-1	316.19	30
Lazar Popovski	Slalom K-1	158.30	29

Women

Athlete	Event	Total	Rank
Ana Ugrinovska	Slalom K-1	346.93	29

== Shooting ==
One Macedonian athlete participated in the shooting events – Darko Naseski.

The 10 m air rifle took place on 22 July 1996. Naseski scored 580 points in the preliminary round. He did not advance to the final round and finished 36th overall.

Men

Athlete	Event	Qualification		Final	
Athlete	Event	Points	Rank	Points	Rank
Darko Naseski	10 m air rifle	580	36	did not advance	

== Swimming ==
Four Macedonian athletes participated in the swimming events – Mirjana Boševska, Kire Filipovski, Aleksandar Malenko and Nataša Meškovska.

The heats for the women's 400 m individual medley took place on 20 July 1996. Boševska finished third in her heat in a time of four minutes 55.57 seconds which was ultimately not fast enough to qualify for the finals.

The heats for the men's 400 m individual medley took place on 21 July 1996. Malenko finished seventh in his heat in a time of four minutes 34.06 seconds which was ultimately not fast enough to qualify for the finals.

The heats for the men's 200 m butterfly took place on 22 July 1996. Malenko finished second in his heat in a time of two minutes 1.46 seconds which was ultimately not fast enough to qualify for the finals.

The heats for the women's 400 m freestyle also took place on 22 July 1996. Boševska won her heat in a time of four minutes 21.27 seconds which was ultimately not fast enough to qualify for the finals.

The heats for the women's 100 m butterfly took place on 23 July 1996. Meškovska finished fifth in her heat in a time of one minute 4.25 seconds which was ultimately not fast enough to qualify for the finals.

The heats for the men's 100 m butterfly took place on 24 July 1996. Filipovski won his heat in a time of 56.13 seconds which was ultimately not fast enough to qualify for the semi-finals.

The heats for the women's 800 m freestyle also took place on 24 July 1996. Boševska finished eighth in her heat in a time of eight minutes 57.52 seconds which was ultimately not fast enough to qualify for the final.

The heats for the men's 200 m individual medley took place on 25 July 1996. Filipovski finished fourth in his heat in a time of two minutes 11.90 seconds which was ultimately not fast enough to qualify for the finals.

The heats for the women's 200 m butterfly took place on 26 July 1996. Meškovska finished second in her heat in a time of two minutes 17.9 seconds which was ultimately not fast enough to qualify for the finals.

Men

Athlete	Event	Heat		Final	
Athlete	Event	Time	Rank	Time	Rank
Kire Filipovski	100 m butterfly	56.13	42	did not advance	
Kire Filipovski	200 m individual medley	2:11.90	35	did not advance	
Aleksandar Malenko	200 m butterfly	2:01.46	23	did not advance	
Aleksandar Malenko	400 m individual medley	4:34.06	24	did not advance	

Women

Athlete	Event	Heat		Final	
Athlete	Event	Time	Rank	Time	Rank
Mirjana Boševska	400 m freestyle	4:21.27	22	did not advance	
Mirjana Boševska	800 m freestyle	8:57.52	22	did not advance	
Mirjana Boševska	400 m individual medley	4:55.57	23	did not advance	
Nataša Meškovska	200 m butterfly	2:17.90	23	did not advance	

== Wrestling ==
Three Macedonian athletes participated in the wrestling events – Vlatko Sokolov, Shaban Tërstena and Valeri Verhušin.

The men's −48 kg took place on 29 and 30 July 1996. Sokolov lost his first round match to Vitalie Railean of Moldova. He then won his classification round match against José Restrepo of Colombia before being eliminated by Gheorghe Corduneanu of Romania.

The men's −57 kg took place on 29 and 30 July 1996. Tërstena won his first round match against Alejandro Puerto of Cuba. He received a bye in the second round and then defeated Aleksandr Guzov of Belarus in the quarter-finals. He lost his semi-final against Guivi Sissaouri of Canada but won his final classification match against Mohammad Talaei of Iran to finish fifth.

The men's −74 kg took place on 31 July and 1 August 1996. Verhušin won his first round match against Rein Ozoline of Australia. He then won his second round match against Boris Budayev of Uzbekistan before losing to Plamen Paskalev of Bulgaria in the quarter-finals. He then lost his classification round match against Takuya Ōta of Japan.

Freestyle

Athlete	Event	Round 1	Round 2	Round 3	Round 4	Final / BM	
Athlete	Event	Opposition Result	Opposition Result	Opposition Result	Opposition Result	Opposition Result	Rank
Vlatko Sokolov	−48 kg	Railean (MDA); L 0-10	Restrepo (COL); W 15-4	Corduneanu (ROM); L 3-7	did not advance		11
Shaban Tërstena	−57 kg	Puerto (CUB); W 4-3	Bye	Guzov (BLR); W 7-3	Sissaouri (CAN); L 1-4	Talaei (IRI); W 4-3	5
Valeri Verhušin	−74 kg	Ozoline (AUS); W 15-7	Budayev (UZB); W 8-0	Paskalev (BUL); L 0-12	Ōta (JPN); L 0-7	did not advance	10
