= Wrestling at the 1996 Summer Olympics – Men's freestyle 48 kg =

Men's freestyle 48 kg at the Games of the XXVI Olympiad
- Venue: Georgia World Congress Center
- Dates: 29–30 July 1996
- Competitors: 19 from 19 nations

Medalists
1st place, gold medalist(s)		Kim Il	North Korea
2nd place, silver medalist(s)		Armen Mkrtchyan	Armenia
3rd place, bronze medalist(s)		Alexis Vila	Cuba

The men's freestyle 48 kilograms at the 1996 Summer Olympics as part of the wrestling program were held at the Georgia World Congress Center from July 29 to July 30. The gold and silver medalists were determined by the final match of the main single-elimination bracket. The losers advanced to the repechage. These matches determined the bronze medalist for the event.

== Results ==
Legend

- WO — Won by walkover

=== Round 1 ===
	Score		CP
1/16 finals
Isaac Jacob (NGR)	0–4	Alexis Vila (CUB)	0–3 PO
Mynor Ramírez (GUA)	0–12	Rob Eiter (USA)	0–4 ST
Armen Mkrtchyan (ARM)	10–0	José Restrepo (COL)	4–0 ST
Vitalie Railean (MDA)	10–0	Vlatko Sokolov (MKD)	4–0 ST
Gheorghe Corduneanu (ROM)	2–3	Nikos Tskouaseli (GRE)	1–3 PP
Kim Il (PRK)	12–2	Fariborz Besarati (SWE)	4–1 SP
Vugar Orujov (RUS)	4–6	Viktor Yefteni (UKR)	1–3 PP
Paul Ragusa (CAN)	1–7	Luvsan-Ishiin Sergelenbaatar (MGL)	1–3 PP
Vladimir Torgovkin (KGZ)	0–11	Jung Soon-won (KOR)	0–4 ST
Filiberto Fernández (MEX)		Bye	

=== Round 2 ===
	Score		CP
1/8 finals
Filiberto Fernández (MEX)	0–11	Alexis Vila (CUB)	0–4 ST
Rob Eiter (USA)	2–9	Armen Mkrtchyan (ARM)	1–3 PP
Vitalie Railean (MDA)	10–1	Nikos Tskouaseli (GRE)	3–1 PP
Kim Il (PRK)	3–0	Viktor Yefteni (UKR)	3–0 PO
Luvsan-Ishiin Sergelenbaatar (MGL)	1–3	Jung Soon-won (KOR)	1–3 PP
Repechage
Isaac Jacob (NGR)	3–0	Mynor Ramírez (GUA)	3–0 PO
José Restrepo (COL)	4–15	Vlatko Sokolov (MKD)	1–4 SP
Gheorghe Corduneanu (ROM)	6–3	Fariborz Besarati (SWE)	3–1 PP
Vugar Orujov (RUS)	12–0	Paul Ragusa (CAN)	4–0 ST
Vladimir Torgovkin (KGZ)		Bye	

=== Round 3 ===
	Score		CP
Quarterfinals
Alexis Vila (CUB)	2–4	Armen Mkrtchyan (ARM)	1–3 PP
Vitalie Railean (MDA)		Bye	
Kim Il (PRK)		Bye	
Jung Soon-won (KOR)		Bye	
Repechage
Vladimir Torgovkin (KGZ)	WO	Isaac Jacob (NGR)	0–4 PA
Vlatko Sokolov (MKD)	3–7	Gheorghe Corduneanu (ROM)	1–3 PP
Vugar Orujov (RUS)	10–0	Filiberto Fernández (MEX)	4–0 ST
Rob Eiter (USA)	11–2	Nikos Tskouaseli (GRE)	3–1 PP
Viktor Yefteni (UKR)	5–1	Luvsan-Ishiin Sergelenbaatar (MGL)	3–1 PP

=== Round 4 ===
	Score		CP
Semifinals
Armen Mkrtchyan (ARM)	7–2	Vitalie Railean (MDA)	3–1 PP
Kim Il (PRK)	3–1	Jung Soon-won (KOR)	3–1 PP
Repechage
Isaac Jacob (NGR)	6–7	Gheorghe Corduneanu (ROM)	1–3 PP
Vugar Orujov (RUS)	10–4	Rob Eiter (USA)	3–1 PP
Viktor Yefteni (UKR)	0–8	Alexis Vila (CUB)	0–3 PO

=== Round 5 ===
	Score		CP
Repechage
Gheorghe Corduneanu (ROM)	0–10	Vugar Orujov (RUS)	0–4 ST
Alexis Vila (CUB)		Bye	

=== Round 6 ===
	Score		CP
Repechage
Vitalie Railean (MDA)	0–10	Alexis Vila (CUB)	0–4 ST
Vugar Orujov (RUS)	5–1	Jung Soon-won (KOR)	3–1 PP

=== Finals ===
	Score		CP
Classification 7th–8th
Gheorghe Corduneanu (ROM)	3–1	Rob Eiter (USA)	3–1 PP
Classification 5th–6th
Vitalie Railean (MDA)	0–4	Jung Soon-won (KOR)	0–3 PO
Bronze medal match
Alexis Vila (CUB)	5–2	Vugar Orujov (RUS)	3–1 PP
Gold medal match
Armen Mkrtchyan (ARM)	4–5	Kim Il (PRK)	1–3 PP

== Final standing ==
Rank	Athlete
1st place, gold medalist(s)	Kim Il (PRK)
2nd place, silver medalist(s)	Armen Mkrtchyan (ARM)
3rd place, bronze medalist(s)	Alexis Vila (CUB)
4	Vugar Orujov (RUS)
5	Jung Soon-won (KOR)
6	Vitalie Railean (MDA)
7	Gheorghe Corduneanu (ROM)
8	Rob Eiter (USA)
9	Isaac Jacob (NGR)
10	Viktor Yefteni (UKR)
11	Vlatko Sokolov (MKD)
12	Luvsan-Ishiin Sergelenbaatar (MGL)
13	Nikos Tskouaseli (GRE)
14	Fariborz Besarati (SWE)
15	José Restrepo (COL)
16	Paul Ragusa (CAN)
17	Mynor Ramírez (GUA)
17	Vladimir Torgovkin (KGZ)
17	Filiberto Fernández (MEX)
