= Colombia at the 1996 Summer Olympics =

- IOC code: COL
- NOC: Colombian Olympic Committee
- Website: www.olimpicocol.co (in Spanish)

in Atlanta
- Competitors: 48 (39 men and 9 women) in 9 sports
- Flag bearer: Marlon Pérez Arango
- Medals: Gold 0 Silver 0 Bronze 0 Total 0

Summer Olympics appearances (overview)
- 1932; 1936; 1948; 1952; 1956; 1960; 1964; 1968; 1972; 1976; 1980; 1984; 1988; 1992; 1996; 2000; 2004; 2008; 2012; 2016; 2020; 2024

Colombia competed at the 1996 Summer Olympics in Atlanta, United States. 48 competitors, 39 men and 9 women, took part in 44 events in 9 sports.

== Competitors ==
The following is the list of number of competitors in the Games.

Sport	Men	Women	Total
Athletics	6	7	13
Boxing	4	–	4
Cycling	11	1	12
Equestrian	2	0	2
Fencing	2	0	2
Shooting	2	0	2
Swimming	4	1	5
Weightlifting	5	–	5
Wrestling	3	–	3
Total	39	9	48

== Athletics ==
Men
Track and road events

Athlete	Event	Heats		Quarterfinal		Semifinal		Final	
Athlete	Event	Result	Rank	Result	Rank	Result	Rank	Result	Rank
William Roldán	5000 metres	14:39.50	35	—N/a		Did not advance			
Herder Vásquez	10,000 metres	33:26.15	41	—N/a				Did not advance	
Carlos Grisales	Marathon	—N/a						2:15:56	11
Julio Hernández	Marathon	—N/a						2:41:56	102
Héctor Moreno	20 kilometres walk	—N/a						DNF	
Héctor Moreno	50 kilometres walk	—N/a						3:54:57	16

Field events

Athlete	Event	Qualification		Final	
Athlete	Event	Distance	Position	Distance	Position
Gilmar Mayo	High jump	2.26	21	Did not advance	

Women
Track and road events

Athlete	Event	Heats		Quarterfinal		Semifinal		Final	
Athlete	Event	Result	Rank	Result	Rank	Result	Rank	Result	Rank
Zandra Borrero	100 metres	11.62	36	Did not advance					
Mirtha Brock	100 metres	11.83	43	Did not advance					
Felipa Palacios	200 metres	24.12	41	Did not advance					
Patricia Rodríguez	200 metres	23.13	16 Q	23.50	27	Did not advance			
Ximena Restrepo	400 metres	DNF		Did not advance					
Iglandini González	Marathon	—N/a						2:35:45	22
Mirtha Brock; Felipa Palacios; Patricia Rodríguez; Zandra Borrero	4 × 100 metres relay	44.16	9	—N/a				Did not advance	

Field events

Athlete	Event	Qualification		Final	
Athlete	Event	Distance	Position	Distance	Position
Zuleima Araméndiz	Javelin throw	54.24	28	Did not advance	

== Boxing ==
Athlete	Event	Round of 32	Round of 16	Quarterfinals	Semifinals	Final	
Athlete	Event	Opposition Result	Opposition Result	Opposition Result	Opposition Result	Opposition Result	Rank
Beibis Mendoza	Light flyweight	Figliomeni (CAN); W 12–1	Kyryukhin (UKR); L 6–18	Did not advance			
Daniel Reyes	Flyweight	Behonegn (ETH); W 16–2	Falah (SYR); W 15–13	Pakeyev (RUS); L 13–13	Did not advance		
Marcos Vernal	Bantamweight	Nafil (MAR); L 3–16	Did not advance				
Dairo Esalas	Light welterweight	Legras (SEY); L 12–26	Did not advance				

== Cycling ==
=== Road ===
Men

Athlete	Event	Time	Rank
Óscar Giraldo	Road race	4:56:50	84
Ruber Marín	Road race	4:56:45	47
Raúl Montaña	Road race	DNF	
Dubán Ramírez	Road race	DNF	
Dubán Ramírez	Time trial	1:11:18	29
Javier Zapata	Road race	4:56:50	84
Javier Zapata	Time trial	1:15:09	37

Women

Athlete	Event	Time	Rank
Maritza Corredor	Road race	DNF	
Maritza Corredor	Time trial	42:06	24

=== Track ===
Pursuit

Athlete	Event	Qualification		Quarterfinals	Semifinals	Final	
Athlete	Event	Time	Rank	Opposition Time	Opposition Time	Opposition Time	Rank
Jhon García; Marlon Pérez Arango; Yovani López; José Velásquez	Men's team pursuit	4:26.400	17	Did not advance			

Points race

Athlete	Event	Laps	Points	Rank
Marlon Pérez Arango	Men's points race	DNF		

=== Mountain biking ===
Athlete	Event	Time	Rank
Jhon Arias	Men's cross-country	2:42:04	23
Juan Arias	Men's cross-country	2:50:44	34

== Equestrianism ==
=== Jumping ===
Athlete	Horse	Event	Qualification								Final					
Athlete	Horse	Event	Round 1		Round 2		Round 3		Total		Round 1		Round 2		Total	
Athlete	Horse	Event	Score	Rank	Score	Rank	Score	Rank	Score	Rank	Penalties	Rank	Penalties	Rank	Penalties	Rank
Alejandro Davila	Ejemplo	Individual	16.00	68	36.25	72	DNF				Did not advance					
Manuel Torres	Cartagena	Individual	12.00	58	12.00	42	0.00	1	24.00	40	Did not advance					

== Fencing ==
Two fencers, both men, represented Colombia in 1996.

Men

Athlete	Event	Round of 64	Round of 32	Round of 16	Quarterfinals	Semifinals	Final	
Athlete	Event	Opposition Result	Opposition Result	Opposition Result	Opposition Result	Opposition Result	Opposition Result	Rank
Juan Miguel Paz	Épée	Carpenter (USA); L 11–15	Did not advance					
Mauricio Rivas	Épée	Bye	Carpenter (USA); W 15–9	Henry (FRA); L 11–15	Did not advance			

== Shooting ==
Men

Athlete	Event	Qualification		Final	
Athlete	Event	Points	Rank	Points	Rank
Danilo Caro	Trap	118	31	Did not advance	
Bernardo Tovar	50 m pistol	558	16	Did not advance	
Bernardo Tovar	25 m rapid fire pistol	565	23	Did not advance	
Bernardo Tovar	10 m air pistol	577	19	Did not advance	

== Swimming ==
Men

Athlete	Event	Heats		Final A/B	
Athlete	Event	Time	Rank	Time	Rank
Alejandro Bermúdez	400 m freestyle	3:57.45	21	Did not advance	
Alejandro Bermúdez	400 m individual medley	4:27.97	17 FB	4:26.64	13
Mauricio Moreno	100 m breaststroke	1:05.22	32	Did not advance	
Diego Perdomo	100 m freestyle	53.01	54	Did not advance	
Diego Perdomo	100 m butterfly	55.08	30	Did not advance	
Armando Serrano	200 m individual medley	2:09.67	33	Did not advance	

Women

Athlete	Event	Heats		Final A/B	
Athlete	Event	Time	Rank	Time	Rank
Isabel Ceballos	100 m breaststroke	1:14.75	38	Did not advance	
Isabel Ceballos	200 m breaststroke	2:36.94	30	Did not advance	

== Weightlifting ==
Athlete	Event	Snatch		Clean & jerk		Total	Rank
Athlete	Event	Result	Rank	Result	Rank	Total	Rank
Nelson Castro	–54 kg	105.0	14	130.0	16	235.0	16
Juan Carlos Fernández	–54 kg	110.0	9	145.0	6	255.0	8
Roger Berrio	–64 kg	122.5	24	155.0	22	277.5	26
Álvaro Velasco	–76 kg	145.0	15	180.0	10	325.0	12
Deivan Valencia	–99 kg	152.5	20	195.0	15	347.5	18

== Wrestling ==
Greco-Roman

Athlete	Event	Round of 32	Round of 16	Quarterfinals	Semifinals	Repechage					Final	
Athlete	Event	Round of 32	Round of 16	Quarterfinals	Semifinals	Round 1	Round 2	Round 3	Round 4	Round 5	Final	
Athlete	Event	Opposition Result	Opposition Result	Opposition Result	Opposition Result	Opposition Result	Opposition Result	Opposition Result	Opposition Result	Opposition Result	Opposition Result	Rank
José Escobar	–68 kg	Smith (USA); L 1–6	Did not advance			Manukyan (ARM); L 0–12	Did not advance					
Juan Giraldo	–100 kg	Saldadze (UKR); L Fall	Did not advance			Suárez (VEN); L 0–3	Did not advance					

Freestyle

Athlete	Event	Round of 32	Round of 16	Quarterfinals	Semifinals	Repechage					Final	
Athlete	Event	Round of 32	Round of 16	Quarterfinals	Semifinals	Round 1	Round 2	Round 3	Round 4	Round 5	Final	
Athlete	Event	Opposition Result	Opposition Result	Opposition Result	Opposition Result	Opposition Result	Opposition Result	Opposition Result	Opposition Result	Opposition Result	Opposition Result	Rank
José Restrepo	–48 kg	Mkrtchyan (ARM); L 0–10	Did not advance			Sokolov (MKD); L 4–15	Did not advance					

== See also ==
- Sports in Colombia
- Colombia at the 1995 Pan American Games
