= Macedonia at the 2002 Winter Olympics =

- Flag of the Republic of Macedonia
- IOC code: MKD
- NOC: Olympic Committee of North Macedonia
- Website: www.mok.org.mk (in Macedonian)

in Salt Lake City
- Competitors: 2 (men) in 2 sports
- Flag bearer: Jana Nikolovska
- Medals: Gold 0 Silver 0 Bronze 0 Total 0

Winter Olympics appearances (overview)
- 1998; 2002; 2006; 2010; 2014; 2018; 2022; 2026

Other related appearances
- Yugoslavia (1924–1992)

Macedonia participated at the 2002 Winter Olympics in Salt Lake City, United States, held between 8 and 24 February 2002. The country's participation in the Games marked its second appearance at the Winter Olympics since its debut in the previous Games.

The Macedonian team consisted of two athletes who competed across three sports. Alpine skier Jana Nikolovska served as the country's flag-bearer during the opening ceremony. North Macedonia did not win any medal in the Games, and has not won a Winter Olympics medal as of these Games.

== Background ==
Athletes from Montenegro competed for Yugoslavia earlier from 1924 to 1988. After its independence from Yugoslavia on 8 September 1991, its National Olympic Committee was formed in 1992. The Olympic Committee of North Macedonia was recognized by the International Olympic Committee (IOC) in 1993. The 1996 Summer Olympics marked Macedonia's first participation as an independent nation in the Olympic Games. After the nation made its debut in the Winter Olympics at the 1998 Winter Games, this edition of the Games in 2002 marked the nation's second appearance at the Winter Games.

The 2002 Winter Olympics was held in Salt Lake City, United States, held between 8 and 24 February 2002. The Macedonian team consisted of two athletes who competed in two sports. Alpine skier Jana Nikolovska served as the country's flag-bearer during the opening ceremony. North Macedonia did not win any medal in the Games, and has not won a Winter Olympics medal as of these Games.

== Competitors ==
Macedonia sent two athletes who competed in four events in two sports at the Games.

Sport	Men	Women	Athletes
Alpine skiing	1	0	1
Cross-country skiing	1	0	1
Total	2	0	2

== Alpine skiing ==
Dejan Panovski represented the country in alpine skiing. This was his first and only participation in the Winter Games. Flag bearer Jana Nikolovska, who was slated to compete in women's giant slalom, withdrew from the event.

The alpine skiing events took place at Park City Mountain Resort. In the giant slalom, he clocked a time of 1:20.48 in the first run. He performed better in the second run with a time of 1:18.30 and finished with a total time of 2:58.03 to finish 52nd amongst 57 finishers. In the Men's slalom event, he failed to finish the course.

Athlete	Event	Race 1	Race 2	Total	
Athlete	Event	Time	Time	Time	Rank
Dejan Panovski	Men's giant slalom	1:20.48	1:18.30	2:38.78	52
Dejan Panovski	Men's slalom	DNF	–	DNF	–

== Cross-country skiing ==
Cross-country skiing competitions were held at Soldier Hollow in Wasatch Mountain State Park. Gjoko Dineski represented the country in the sport. This was the second Winter Games for Dineski, who made his debut at the 1998 Games. In the 30 km freestyle competition, Dineski finished in 68th place with a time of over one hour and 33 minutes. In the men's sprint event, he crossed the 1,480 m (4,860 ft) course in 3:29.29. He was ranked 64th in the final classification for the qualifying rounds, and failed to advance to the next round.

Athlete	Event	Qualifying		Finals	
Athlete	Event	Time	Rank	Time	Rank
Gjoko Dineski	Men's 30 km freestyle	—		1'33:33.9	68
Gjoko Dineski	Men's sprint	3:29.29	64	Did not advance	
