= Macedonia at the 1998 Winter Olympics =

- Flag of the Republic of Macedonia
- IOC code: MKD
- NOC: Olympic Committee of North Macedonia
- Website: www.mok.org.mk (in Macedonian)

in Nagano
- Competitors: 3 (2 men, 1 woman) in 2 sports
- Flag bearer: Gjoko Dineski (cross-country skiing)
- Medals: Gold 0 Silver 0 Bronze 0 Total 0

Winter Olympics appearances (overview)
- 1998; 2002; 2006; 2010; 2014; 2018; 2022; 2026

Other related appearances
- Yugoslavia (1924–1992)

The Republic of Macedonia (officially under the provisional appellation "former Yugoslav Republic of Macedonia", short "FYR Macedonia") competed in the Winter Olympic Games for the first time at the 1998 Winter Olympics in Nagano, Japan.

== Competitors ==
The following is the list of number of competitors in the Games.

Sport	Men	Women	Total
Alpine skiing	1	1	2
Cross-country skiing	1	0	1
Total	2	1	3

== Alpine skiing ==
Men

Athlete	Event	Race 1	Race 2	Total	
Athlete	Event	Time	Time	Time	Rank
Aleksandar Stojanovski	Giant Slalom	1:31.83	1:29.34	3:01.17	36

Women

Athlete	Event	Race 1	Race 2	Total	
Athlete	Event	Time	Time	Time	Rank
Jana Nikolovska	Giant Slalom	1:38.14	1:51.83	3:29.97	33

== Cross-country skiing ==
Men

Event	Athlete	Race	
Event	Athlete	Time	Rank
10 km C	Gjoko Dineski	39:39.3	91

C = Classical style, F = Freestyle
