= Macedonia at the 2010 Winter Olympics =

- Flag of the Republic of Macedonia
- IOC code: MKD
- NOC: Olympic Committee of North Macedonia
- Website: www.mok.org.mk (in Macedonian)

in Vancouver
- Competitors: 3 in 2 sports
- Flag bearer: Antonio Ristevski
- Medals: Gold 0 Silver 0 Bronze 0 Total 0

Winter Olympics appearances (overview)
- 1998; 2002; 2006; 2010; 2014; 2018; 2022; 2026

Other related appearances
- Yugoslavia (1924–1992)

Macedonia sent a delegation to compete at the 2010 Winter Olympics in Vancouver, British Columbia, Canada from 12 to 28 February 2010. The Macedonian delegation consisted of three athletes, alpine skier Antonio Ristevski and two cross-country skiers, Rosana Kiroska and Darko Damjanovski. The nation's best finish was by Ristevski in the men's giant slalom, where he placed 53rd.

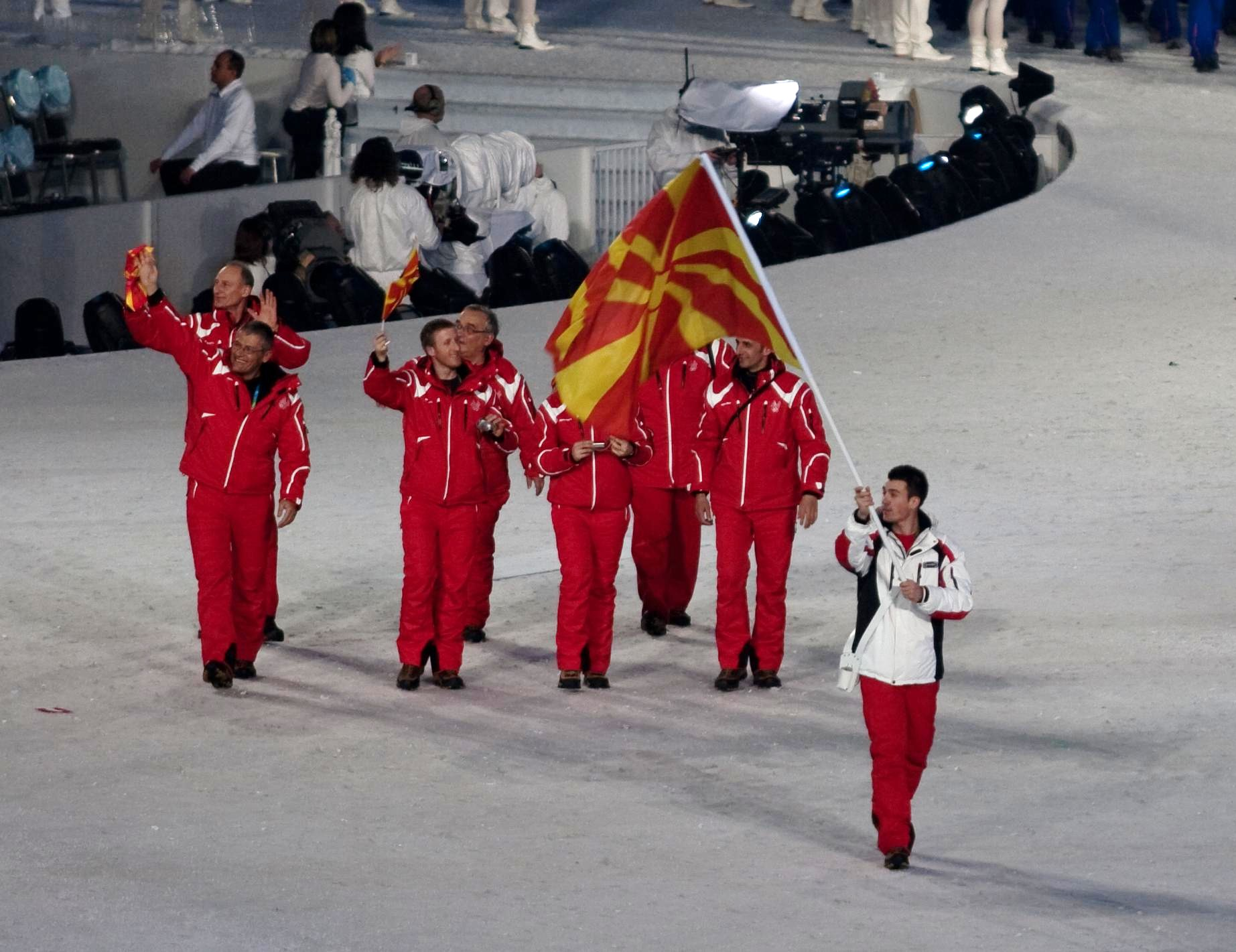
Macedonia at the opening ceremony

== Background ==
The Olympic Committee of the Former Yugoslav Republic of Macedonia was recognized by the International Olympic Committee on 1 January 1993. The nation made its Summer Olympics debut at the 1996 Atlanta Games, and its first appearance in the Winter Olympic Games at the 1998 Nagano Olympics. Macedonia has participated in every Olympics since their respective debuts. No athlete competing for Macedonia has ever won a medal at the Winter Olympics. The Macedonian delegation to Vancouver consisted of three athletes, alpine skier Antonio Ristevski and two cross-country skiers, Rosana Kiroska and Darko Damjanovski. Ristevski was chosen as the flag bearer for both the opening ceremony and the closing ceremony.

== Alpine skiing ==
Antonio Ristevski was 20 years old at the time of the Vancouver Olympics, and would go on to represent Macedonia at the 2014 Winter Olympics. On 23 February, he took part in the giant slalom race, posting leg times of 1 minute and 24 seconds and 1 minute and 27 seconds. His combined time of 2 minutes and 51 seconds placed him 53rd for the event, out of 81 competitors who finished both runs of the race. In the slalom on 27 February, he failed to finish the first run, and therefore went unranked for the competition.

Athlete	Event	Run 1	Run 2	Total	Rank
Antonio Ristevski	Men's slalom	DNF	did not advance		
Antonio Ristevski	Men's giant slalom	1:24.29	1:27.61	2:51.90	53

== Cross-country skiing ==
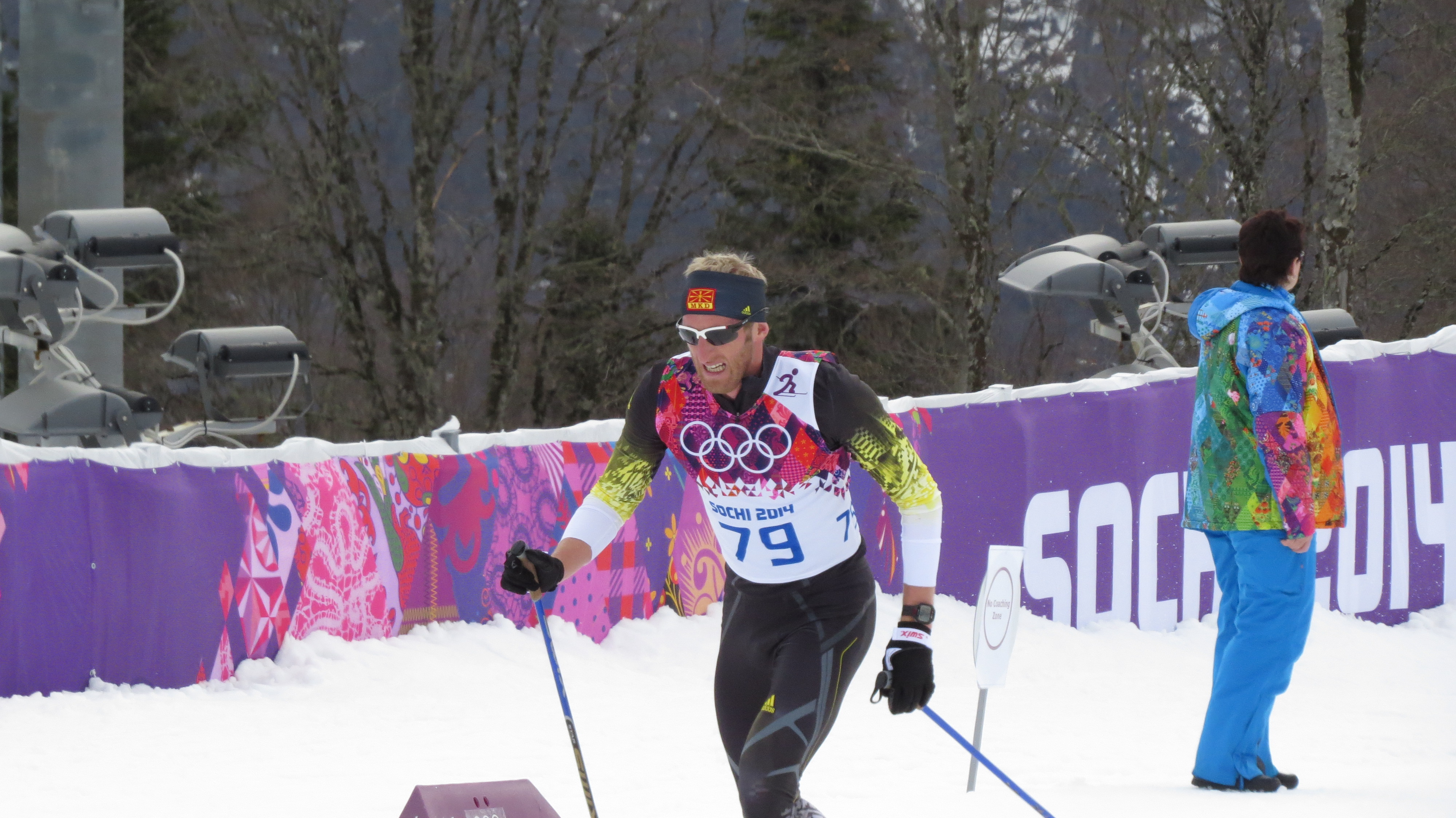
Darko Damjanovski at the 2014 Winter Olympics

Rosana Kiroska was 19 years old at the time of the Vancouver Games, which marked her only Olympic appearance to date. In her event, the women's 10 kilometre freestyle which was held on 15 February, she finished with a time of 32 minutes and 46 seconds This put her in 76th position out of 77 competitors who finished the race, and she was nearly 10 minutes behind the gold medal time. Darko Damjanovski was 28 years old at the time of the Games, and he had previously represented Macedonia at the 2006 Winter Olympics and would go on to do so again in 2014. His event, the men's 15 kilometre freestyle was also held on 15 February. Damjanovski finished in a time of 41 minutes and 48 seconds. This put him in 85th place, roughly eight minutes slower than the gold medal time.

Athlete	Event	Final	
Athlete	Event	Time	Rank
Rosana Kiroska	Women's 10 kilometre freestyle	34:45.8	76
Darko Damjanovski	Men's 15 kilometre freestyle	41:48.2	85

== See also ==
- Macedonia at the 2010 Summer Youth Olympics
