= Macedonia at the 2014 Winter Olympics =

- Flag of the Republic of Macedonia
- IOC code: MKD
- NOC: Olympic Committee of North Macedonia
- Website: www.mok.org.mk (in Macedonian)

in Sochi
- Competitors: 3 in 2 sports
- Flag bearer: Darko Damjanovski
- Medals: Gold 0 Silver 0 Bronze 0 Total 0

Winter Olympics appearances (overview)
- 1998; 2002; 2006; 2010; 2014; 2018; 2022; 2026

Other related appearances
- Yugoslavia (1924–1992)

Macedonia competed at the 2014 Winter Olympics in Sochi, Russia from the 7 to 23 February 2014. The Macedonian team consisted of three athletes in two sports.

== Alpine skiing ==
According to the final quota allocation released on January 20, 2014, Macedonia had one athlete in qualification position.

Athlete	Event	Run 1		Run 2		Total	
Athlete	Event	Time	Rank	Time	Rank	Time	Rank
Antonio Ristevski	Men's giant slalom	DNF					
Antonio Ristevski	Men's slalom	55.38	56	1:03.06	28	1:58.44	29

== Cross-country skiing ==
According to the final quota allocation released on January 20, 2014, Macedonia had two athletes in qualification position. Damjanovski finished the men's classical race in 81st position out of 92 athletes, besting his performance from four years prior (where he finished 85th). Meanwhile, 16-year-old Kolaroska finished in 74th out of 76 competitors in her Olympic debut. Damjanovski also took part in the sprint competition and failed to make it out of the qualification round.

Distance

Athlete	Event	Final		
Athlete	Event	Time	Deficit	Rank
Darko Damjanovski	Men's 15 km classical	48:34.9	+10:05.2	81
Darko Damjanovski	Men's 50 km freestyle	DNF		
Marija Kolaroska	Women's 10 km classical	44:46.0	+16:28.2	71

Sprint

Athlete	Event	Qualification		Quarterfinal		Semifinal		Final	
Athlete	Event	Time	Rank	Time	Rank	Time	Rank	Time	Rank
Darko Damjanovski	Men's sprint	4:08.56	78	Did not advance					
