= North Macedonia at the 2022 Winter Olympics =

- Flag of North Macedonia
- IOC code: MKD
- NOC: Olympic Committee of North Macedonia
- Website: www.mok.org.mk (in Macedonian)

in Beijing, China 4–20 February 2022
- Competitors: 3 (2 men and 1 woman) in 2 sports
- Flag bearer (opening): Dardan Dehari
- Flag bearer (closing): Volunteer
- Medals: Gold 0 Silver 0 Bronze 0 Total 0

Winter Olympics appearances (overview)
- 1998; 2002; 2006; 2010; 2014; 2018; 2022; 2026

Other related appearances
- Yugoslavia (1924–1992)

North Macedonia competed at the 2022 Winter Olympics in Beijing, China, from 4 to 20 February 2022.

The North Macedonia team consisted of three athletes (two men and one woman) competing in two sports. Dardan Dehari was the country's flag bearer during the opening ceremony. Meanwhile a volunteer was the flag bearer during the closing ceremony.

== Competitors ==
The following is the list of number of competitors participating at the Games per sport/discipline.

Sport	Men	Women	Total
Alpine skiing	1	0	1
Cross-country skiing	1	1	2
Total	2	1	3

== Alpine skiing ==
By meeting the basic qualification standards, North Macedonia has qualified one male alpine skier. Dardan Dehari however did not compete in any events.

== Cross-country skiing ==
By meeting the basic qualification standards, North Macedonia has qualified one male and one female cross-country skier.

Distance

Athlete	Event	Final	
Athlete	Event	Time	Rank
Stavre Jada	Men's 50 km freestyle	1:25:41.8	56
Ana Cvetanovska	Women's 10 km classical	39:57.7	95

Sprint

Athlete	Event	Qualification		Quarterfinal		Semifinal		Final	
Athlete	Event	Time	Rank	Time	Rank	Time	Rank	Time	Rank
Stavre Jada	Men's	3:29.13	86	did not advance					
