= Wrestling at the 1996 Summer Olympics – Men's freestyle 74 kg =

Men's freestyle 74 kg at the Games of the XXVI Olympiad
- Venue: Georgia World Congress Center
- Dates: 1–2 August 1996
- Competitors: 22 from 22 nations

Medalists
1st place, gold medalist(s)		Buvaisar Saitiev	Russia
2nd place, silver medalist(s)		Park Jang-soon	South Korea
3rd place, bronze medalist(s)		Takuya Ota	Japan

The men's freestyle 74 kilograms at the 1996 Summer Olympics as part of the wrestling program were held at the Georgia World Congress Center from August 1 to August 2. The gold and silver medalists were determined by the final match of the main single-elimination bracket. The losers advanced to the repechage. These matches determined the bronze medalist for the event.

== Results ==
Legend

- WO — Won by walkover

=== Round 1 ===
	Score		CP
1/16 finals
David Hohl (CAN)	3–4	Boris Budaev (UZB)	1–3 PP
Rein Ozoline (AUS)	7–15 Fall	Valerij Verhušin (MKD)	0–4 TO
Takuya Ota (JPN)	11–0	Felipe Guzmán (MEX)	4–0 ST
Árpád Ritter (HUN)	3–5	Igor Kozyr (BLR)	1–3 PP
Park Jang-soon (KOR)	4–1	Magomedsalam Gadzhiev (AZE)	3–1 PP
Magomed Kurugliyev (KAZ)	1–7	Victor Peicov (MDA)	1–3 PP
Radion Kertanti (SVK)	4–3	Turan Ceylan (TUR)	3–1 PP
Alberto Rodríguez (CUB)	1–1	Kenny Monday (USA)	1–3 PP
Buvaisar Saitiev (RUS)	8–0	Issa Momeni (IRI)	3–0 PO
Alexander Leipold (GER)	6–0	Lazaros Loizidis (GRE)	3–0 PO
Anthony Mbume (CMR)	0–10	Plamen Paskalev (BUL)	0–4 ST

=== Round 2 ===
	Score		CP
1/8 finals
Boris Budaev (UZB)	0–8 Fall	Valerij Verhušin (MKD)	0–4 TO
Takuya Ota (JPN)	4–1	Igor Kozyr (BLR)	3–1 PP
Park Jang-soon (KOR)	3–0	Victor Peicov (MDA)	3–0 PO
Radion Kertanti (SVK)	1–5	Kenny Monday (USA)	1–3 PP
Buvaisar Saitiev (RUS)	3–1	Alexander Leipold (GER)	3–1 PP
Plamen Paskalev (BUL)		Bye	
Repechage
David Hohl (CAN)	11–5	Rein Ozoline (AUS)	3–1 PP
Felipe Guzmán (MEX)	0–12	Árpád Ritter (HUN)	0–4 ST
Magomedsalam Gadzhiev (AZE)	4–0	Magomed Kurugliyev (KAZ)	3–0 PO
Turan Ceylan (TUR)	0–7	Alberto Rodríguez (CUB)	0–3 PO
Issa Momeni (IRI)	3–0	Lazaros Loizidis (GRE)	3–0 PO
Anthony Mbume (CMR)		Bye	

=== Round 3 ===
	Score		CP
Quarterfinals
Plamen Paskalev (BUL)	12–0	Valerij Verhušin (MKD)	4–0 ST
Takuya Ota (JPN)	0–5	Park Jang-soon (KOR)	0–3 PO
Kenny Monday (USA)		Bye	
Buvaisar Saitiev (RUS)		Bye	
Repechage
Anthony Mbume (CMR)	0–10	David Hohl (CAN)	0–4 ST
Árpád Ritter (HUN)	2–3	Magomedsalam Gadzhiev (AZE)	1–3 PP
Alberto Rodríguez (CUB)	4–1	Issa Momeni (IRI)	3–1 PP
Boris Budaev (UZB)	4–2	Igor Kozyr (BLR)	3–1 PP
Victor Peicov (MDA)	5–0	Radion Kertanti (SVK)	3–0 PO
Alexander Leipold (GER)		Bye	

=== Round 4 ===
	Score		CP
Semifinals
Plamen Paskalev (BUL)	3–5	Park Jang-soon (KOR)	1–3 PP
Kenny Monday (USA)	1–6	Buvaisar Saitiev (RUS)	1–3 PP
Repechage
Alexander Leipold (GER)	10–2	David Hohl (CAN)	3–1 PP
Magomedsalam Gadzhiev (AZE)	6–2	Alberto Rodríguez (CUB)	3–1 PP
Boris Budaev (UZB)	3–5	Victor Peicov (MDA)	1–3 PP
Valerij Verhušin (MKD)	0–7	Takuya Ota (JPN)	0–3 PO

=== Round 5 ===
	Score		CP
Repechage
Alexander Leipold (GER)	3–0	Magomedsalam Gadzhiev (AZE)	3–0 PO
Victor Peicov (MDA)	4–5	Takuya Ota (JPN)	1–3 PP

=== Round 6 ===
	Score		CP
Repechage
Plamen Paskalev (BUL)	8–4	Alexander Leipold (GER)	3–1 PP
Takuya Ota (JPN)	4–2	Kenny Monday (USA)	3–1 PP

=== Finals ===
	Score		CP
Classification 7th–8th
Magomedsalam Gadzhiev (AZE)	WO	Victor Peicov (MDA)	0–4 PA
Classification 5th–6th
Alexander Leipold (GER)	WO	Kenny Monday (USA)	4–0 PA
Bronze medal match
Plamen Paskalev (BUL)	3–5	Takuya Ota (JPN)	1–3 PP
Gold medal match
Park Jang-soon (KOR)	0–5	Buvaisar Saitiev (RUS)	0–3 PO

== Final standing ==
Rank	Athlete
1st place, gold medalist(s)	Buvaisar Saitiev (RUS)
2nd place, silver medalist(s)	Park Jang-soon (KOR)
3rd place, bronze medalist(s)	Takuya Ota (JPN)
4	Plamen Paskalev (BUL)
5	Alexander Leipold (GER)
6	Kenny Monday (USA)
7	Victor Peicov (MDA)
8	Magomedsalam Gadzhiev (AZE)
9	David Hohl (CAN)
10	Valerij Verhušin (MKD)
11	Alberto Rodríguez (CUB)
12	Boris Budaev (UZB)
13	Árpád Ritter (HUN)
14	Igor Kozyr (BLR)
15	Radion Kertanti (SVK)
16	Issa Momeni (IRI)
17	Rein Ozoline (AUS)
18	Turan Ceylan (TUR)
19	Magomed Kurugliyev (KAZ)
20	Anthony Mbume (CMR)
20	Lazaros Loizidis (GRE)
20	Felipe Guzmán (MEX)
