= Macedonia at the 2006 Winter Olympics =

- Flag of the Republic of Macedonia
- IOC code: MKD
- NOC: Olympic Committee of North Macedonia
- Website: www.mok.org.mk (in Macedonian)

in Turin
- Competitors: 3 (2 men, 1 woman) in 2 sports
- Flag bearers: Gjorgi Markovski (opening and closing)
- Medals: Gold 0 Silver 0 Bronze 0 Total 0

Winter Olympics appearances (overview)
- 1998; 2002; 2006; 2010; 2014; 2018; 2022; 2026

Other related appearances
- Yugoslavia (1924–1992)

The Republic of Macedonia sent a delegation to compete at the 2006 Winter Olympics in Turin, Italy from 10–26 February 2006. This was Macedonia's third appearance at a Winter Olympic Games. The delegation consisted of three athletes; Ivana Ivčevska and Gjorgi Markovski in alpine skiing, and Darko Damjanovski in cross-country skiing. Their best performance in any event was 40th, by Ivčevska in the women's giant slalom.

== Background ==
The Olympic Committee of the Former Yugoslav Republic of Macedonia was recognized by the International Olympic Committee on 1 January 1993. The nation made its Summer Olympics debut at the 1996 Atlanta Games, and its first appearance in the Winter Olympic Games at the 1998 Nagano Olympics. Macedonia has participated in every Olympics since their respective debuts. No athlete competing for Macedonia has ever won a medal at the Winter Olympics. The Macedonian delegation to Turin consisted of three athletes; Ivana Ivčevska and Gjorgi Markovski in alpine skiing, and Darko Damjanovski in cross-country skiing. Markovski was the flag bearer for both the opening ceremony and the closing ceremony.

== Alpine skiing ==
Ivana Ivčevska was 17 years old at the time of the Turin Olympics, and was making her Olympic debut. She was entered into two events, the giant slalom and the slalom. The slalom was held on 22 February, and consisted of two runs, with the total time determining the final standings. Ivčevska finished her first run in a time of 52.40 seconds and her second in a slower 57.73 seconds. Her total time was 1 minute and 50.13 seconds, which put her in 48th place out of 51 competitors who were able to finish both runs. On 24 February, she took part in the giant slalom, completing the first run in a time of 1 minute and 13.89 seconds, and the second in 1 minute and 23.47 seconds. Her total time was 2 minutes and 37.36 seconds, good for 40th place.

Gjorgi Markovski was 20 years old at the time of the 2006 Olympics, and was also making his Olympic debut. In the men's giant slalom on 20 February, he failed to finish the first run, and was eliminated from the competition. In the slalom, held on 25 February, he finished the first run in a time of 1 minute and 4.03 seconds, but failed to finish the second run, and went unranked for the competition.

Athlete	Event	Final			
Athlete	Event	Run 1	Run 2	Total	Rank
Ivana Ivčevska	Women's giant slalom	1:13.89	1:23.47	2:37.36	40
Ivana Ivčevska	Women's slalom	52.40	57.73	1:50.13	48
Gjorgi Markovski	Men's giant slalom	did not finish			
Gjorgi Markovski	Men's slalom	1:04.03	did not finish		

== Cross-country skiing ==
Darko Damjanovski was 24 years old at the time of the Turin Olympics, and was making his Olympic debut. In the men's 15 kilometre classical held on 17 February, he finished with a time of 48 minutes and 33.7 seconds, putting him 84th out of 96 classified finishers. He would go on to represent Macedonia again at the 2010 Winter Olympics, and a third time at the 2014 Winter Olympics.

Athlete	Event	Final	
Athlete	Event	Total	Rank
Darko Damjanovski	Men's 15 km classical	48:33.7	84
