= 2006 Winter Olympics opening ceremony =

- Part of 2006 Winter Olympics
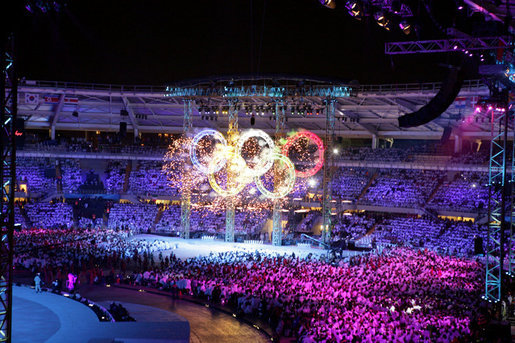
- Fireworks illuminated the Olympic rings during the 2006 Winter Olympics Opening Ceremony
- Date: 10 February 2006
- Time: 20:00 - 0:00 CET(UTC+1)
- Venue: Stadio Olimpico Grande Torino
- Location: Turin, Italy; 45°2′30.30″N 7°39′0.05″E
- Also known as: Passion Lives Here
- Filmed by: Torino Olympic Broadcasting Organisation (TOBO)
- Footage: Torino 2006 Opening Ceremony - Full length on YouTube

The opening ceremony of the 2006 Winter Olympics (Torino 2006) was held on 10 February 2006 beginning at 20:00 CET (UTC+1) at the Stadio Olimpico in Turin, Italy.

The ceremony was attended by 35,000 spectators with the presence of numerous international and Italian guests on the stage and heads of state and government on the stands. The event was broadcast live to an estimated two-billion audience worldwide by 32 television cameras.

The ceremony saluted the region's culture and history, was highlighted by Italian celebrities and showcased Italian designs. There were the customary parade of athletes and raising of the host nation's flag and the Olympic flag. Apart from the choreography, the fireworks, and the pageantry, the ceremony was a reminder of peace as a goal of these Games. It climaxed with the lighting of the Olympic Flame.

== Program ==
The theme of the program was "Passion Lives Here," and the 4000m^{2} stage was shaped like an anatomic heart with a mosh pit in the centre where the athletes congregated for the second half of the ceremonies. The athletes were thus put in the centre of action and in front of the stage, emphasizing that the heart of each athlete was the focus of the Games.

There were sentiments of self-conceit amongst TOROC for not including a tribute section during the opening ceremonies honoring the past host cities of the previous installments of the Olympic Winter Games that was the very first part of the XIX Olympic Winter Games that had been held in Salt Lake City, US, on 8 February 2002.

The ceremony was conducted in French and English, the two official languages of the International Olympic Committee, and Italian, the language of the host country. The program was executed by 6,100 volunteers and 240 professionals after 15,000 man days of work.

=== Rhythm of Passion ===
Sparks of Passion

- Artistic, 1m countdown plus 4m 20s
- 776 performers
- Direction: Gabriele Vacis
- Assistant direction: Roberto Tarasco
- Choreography: Giuseppe Arena
- Moshpit choreography: Doug Jack
- Pyrotechnical effects: Christophe Berthonneau
- Segment coordinator: Annalisa Barbieri
- Helmet-donning skaters costume design: Lino Dainese
- Sparks special effects: Vittorio Comi
- Helmet-donning skaters choreography: Giuseppe Arena
- Helmet-donning skaters: Fabio Cassinelli, Simone Giaccaglia, Luca Imperio, Elia Locagliano, Simone Martino, Daniele Pin
- Original Music: Composed arranged and orchestrated by Michele Centonze in collaboration with Stefano Nanni

The opening ceremonies began with a traditional countdown by the spectators. Italian gymnast Jury Chechi as a shaman striking an anvil with a hammer opened the first scene of the program representing the industrial past of the Piedmont region. Each strike spewed up a fountain of flames and were responded to with flames over three metres high, lit from 52 nozzles lined up around the piazza. A group of inline skaters in red unitards soon entered and executed their choreograph and formations. With the fire, costume and flood light, the stage was soon turned into a sea of red. In the mosh pit, performers executed synchronised swimming moves to the pulsing rhythm. It was said that the choreographer was inspired by synchronised swimming when he saw the event for the first time during the 2004 Summer Olympics in Athens.

The skaters then gyrated to the pulsing rhythm forming a familiar heart shape pumping to the beat. The formation was soon shattered when a lone skater symbolising a spark of passion shot through the beating heart. Six helmet-donning skaters then entered with two-foot flames flared from the back of their helmets and crisscrossed the stage.

=== Greetings from the Alps ===
Mountain Folk

- Artistic, 4m 30s
- 829 performers
- Direction: Gabriele Vacis
- Moshpit choreography: Doug Jack
- Segment coordinator: Annalisa Barbieri
- Music: Occitane Anthem "Se Chanta" performed by L'Ange Gardien Chorus; Ouverture "Gazza Ladra" by Rossini, arranged and orchestrated by Michele Centonze in collaboration with Stefano Nanni

Following the exit of the flaming skaters, the sounding of seven alphorns to the notes of the Occitan Hymn signaled the beginning of the next segment that paid tribute to the Alps and the seven Alpine countries: Italy, France, Switzerland, Liechtenstein, Austria, Germany and Slovenia. Artificial snow and life-size pine tree shapes set the mood for this segment as the stage was transformed from red to white.

It had been 14 years since the Winter Olympic Games were last held in the Alps, in 1992 in Albertville, France. The 13 million people living in the mountainous region were represented by dancers waltzing in their national costumes. Life-size cow effigies were pulled in and paraded around the stage representing the significance of the dairy farming industry in the Alpine region. Three waltzing couples in cow suits soon entered the scene, while cow bells were heard ringing from the crowd.

After the stage was cleared, 50 performers in white unitards entered with very large white balloons on their heads symbolising the arrival of the snowflakes. A change of music signalled the exit of the snowflakes and in the mosh pit performers formed a snowflake which was lit up by flashlights as the segment came to a close.

=== Italy ===
Italian flag

Entry of the authorities

Italian anthem

- Direction: Gabriele Vacis
- Artistic direction and costume design: Giorgio Armani
- Protocol coordinator: Sigrid Guillion Mangilli
- Protocol segment coordinator: Pamela Allvin
- Segment coordinator: Annalisi Barbieri
- Coordinator: CONI - Comitato Olimpico Nazionale Italiano
- Carabineers' Guard of Honour
- Music: "Amarcord", by Nino Rota; Italian Anthem, composed by Goffredo Mameli and Michele Novaro, arranged by Michele Centonze

This section paid tribute to the Italian flag, whose entrance was led by 26 Olympic medalists in white suits and gowns marching in two files. Following the athletes was model, singer and future French first lady Carla Bruni carrying a folded Italian flag. Bruni wore a sparkling gown by Giorgio Armani, inspired by crystal and ice.

The stage was flooded in the Italian colours red, white, and green by the coloured spotlights at the top of the stadium as the entrance of the president of the International Olympic Committee Jacques Rogge and the president of Italy Carlo Azeglio Ciampi was announced.

Sustained drumbeats set a mood as three Carabinieri officers entered and retrieved the flag from Bruni and brought it to the flag pole.

The flag was raised to the solo rendition of the Italian national anthem after a short pastoral orchestra introduction (as opposed to the usual marching introduction). "Il Canto degli Italiani" was performed by nine-year-old Eleonora Benetti wearing the Italian tricolour. Her verse ended as the choir, conducted by Roberto Bertaina, joined in for the much more rapid refrain.

=== Torino Olympic City ===
XX Olympic Winter Games

The Great Skier

- Artistic, 6m 10s
- 467 performers
- Direction & Choreography Concept: Doug Jack
- Choreography: Bryn Walters, Nikis Lagousakos, Claire Terri
- Segment coordinator: Annalisa Barbieri
- Original music: composed arranged and orchestrated by Michele Centonze in collaboration with Stefano Nanni

467 performers, each wearing one of the 5 Olympic colours, created a 20-meter-tall (66 ft) ski jumper formation, after the playing of the Italian national anthem. The choreography showed an animated ski jumper gliding down the take-off slope, flying through the night air and eventually landing safely in perfect form on the ground. Puffs of air could be seen as the jumper prepared his jump. Performers carrying a blue banner then entered to show the skier gliding down the slope. In flight the figure was lit up by headlamp flashlights in a formation of a ski jumper in peak flight. The ski jumper eventually made a graceful landing on the ground as performers released confetti (to represent a snowplow stop) and cheered as the segment came to a close.

=== Olympic Spirit ===
Citius, altius, fortius

- Artistic, 6m 10s
- 149 performers
- Direction and choreography: Giulia Staccioli (Kataklò)
- Technical director: Richard Hartman
- Production director: Simone Masserini
- Segment coordinator: Vichi Lombardo
- Kataklò technical Coordinator: Andrea Zorzi
- Ground choreography: Bryn Walters
- Performer athletes: Maria Agatiello, Davide Agostini, Sara Bonarti, Ilaria Cinzia Cavagna, Mauro Maurizio Colucci, Valentina Marino, Giulia Piolanti, Stefano Pribaz, Davide Rabaioli, Marco Zanotti, Gabriele Zappa
- Original music: composed, arranged and orchestrated by Michele Centonze, in collaboration with Stefano Nanni

The Sparks of Passion reentered the stadium in this segment where the largest and tallest Olympic Rings for the opening ceremonies would be created. Acrobats could be seen maneuvering on three ring shaped frames floating up and down along four lattice columns on the opposite end of the stadium to the stage and the mosh pit. Dancers in red unitards below gyrated to pulsing beats as the theme of passion returned for this segment of the program. While the acrobats descended to the ground, two additional ring shaped frames were raised. The five circular frames were flipped vertically revealing the five Olympic Rings shimmering in light. The rings were then illuminated in the Olympic colours and the structure was lit up in fireworks. The black ring in the centre of the symbol was substituted with white since it is impossible to produce black light.

=== Heroes of Our Time - Parade of Nations ===
- Protocol, 53m
- Director & Choreography: Doug Jack
- Placard bearers' costumes: Moschino (Rossella Jardini, Joan Tann)
- Music: Medley of disco music

The national teams then entered underneath the five-ring structure in the traditional Parade of Nations. As with all Olympic games, the first team to emerge was Greece, since it was the birthplace of the games, and the host nation Italy entered last. The rest of the nations entered following the alphabetical order according to the spelling of the country in Italian, the language of the host country, as is tradition.

The names of the nations were announced first in Italian, then in English and followed by French.

North Korea and South Korea marched together under the Unification Flag for the first time in the Winter Olympic Games; this would not happen again (either Summer or Winter) until the 2018 Winter Olympics in PyeongChang. Altogether, 80 National Olympic Committees participated in the Games, an increase from 77 in the previous Winter Games.

The Moschino designed the clothes of the women bearing the placards with team names in Italian for the athletes' parade. The dresses were shaped as snowy mountain tops, complete with pine trees and small houses lit up by embedded lights. Miss Italia 2005, Edelfa Chiara Masciotta, was carrying the placard for team Italy who wore a special dress designed to pay tribute to Turin. When assembled on stage the ladies represented the Italian Alps' beauty, strength, and poise.

The march of the Olympic teams was accompanied by a selection of 1970s and 1980s American and European disco music, including "Video Killed the Radio Star" by The Buggles, "Y.M.C.A." by the Village People, "I Will Survive" by Gloria Gaynor, "Daddy Cool" by Boney M, and songs by the Doobie Brothers and Eurythmics, among others.

The following table lists the countries and territories in the order of their entrance. It is worth noting that not all the athletes participated in the opening ceremonies, as some may have chosen to prepare themselves for the first events that were scheduled the very next morning. Other National Olympic Committees may have prevented some athletes from participating in the parade. For example, most men's ice hockey teams would not arrive in Turin until the following week since most of the players are involved with the NHL. On the other hand, the parade included officials, judges, coaches and other team staff.

Nation	Italian Name	Flag bearer	Sport	Athletes
Greece	Grecia	Eleftherios Fafalis	Cross-country skiing	5
Albania	Albania	Erjon Tola	Alpine skiing	1
Algeria	Algeria	Christelle Laura Douibi	Alpine skiing	2
Andorra	Andorra	Alex Antor	Alpine skiing	3
Argentina	Argentina	María Belén Simari Birkner	Alpine skiing	9
Armenia	Armenia	Vazgen Azroyan	Figure skating	5
Australia	Australia	Alisa Camplin	Freestyle skiing	40
Austria	Austria	Renate Götschl	Alpine skiing	73
Azerbaijan	Azerbaigian	Mikhail Rakimov		2
Belgium	Belgio	Kevin van der Perren	Figure skating	4
Bermuda	Bermuda	Patrick Singleton	Skeleton	1
Belarus	Bielorussia	Alexandr Popov	Coach (Biathlon)	28
Bosnia and Herzegovina	Bosnia Erzegovina	Aleksandra Vasiljević	Biathlon	6
Brazil	Brasile	Isabel Clark	Snowboarding	9
Bulgaria	Bulgaria	Ekaterina Dafovska	Biathlon	21
Canada	Canada	Danielle Goyette	Ice hockey	191
Czech Republic	Repubblica Ceca	Martina Sáblíková	Speed skating	83
Chile	Cile	Daniela Anguita	Alpine skiing	9
People's Republic of China	Cina	Yang Yang (A)	Short track speed skating	73
Cyprus	Cipro	Theodoros Christodoulou	Alpine skiing	1
North Korea	Corea	Han Jong-In	Figure skating	6
South Korea	Corea	Lee Bo-ra	Speed skating	40
Costa Rica	Costa Rica	Arthur James Barton	Coach	1
Croatia	Croazia	Janica Kostelić	Alpine skiing	23
Denmark	Danimarca	Dorthe Holm	Curling	4
Estonia	Estonia	Eveli Saue	Biathlon	26
Ethiopia	Etiopia	Robel Teklemariam	Cross-country skiing	1
Former Yugoslav Republic of Macedonia	Ex Repubblica Jugoslava di Macedonia	Gjorgi Markovski	Alpine skiing	3
Finland	Finlandia	Janne Lahtela	Freestyle skiing	90
France	Francia	Bruno Mingeon	Bobsleigh	82
Georgia	Georgia	Vakhtang Murvanidze	Figure skating	3
Germany	Germania	Kati Wilhelm	Biathlon	155
Japan	Giappone	Joji Kato	Speed skating	110
Great Britain	Gran Bretagna	Rhona Martin	Curling	39
Hong Kong, China	Hong Kong, Cina	Yueshuang Han	Short track speed skating	1
India	India	Neha Ahuja	Alpine skiing	4
Islamic Republic of Iran	Iran	Alidad Saveh-Shemshaki	Alpine skiing	2
Ireland	Irlanda	Kirsten McGarry	Alpine skiing	4
Iceland	Islanda	Dagny Kristjansdottir	Alpine skiing	5
Virgin Islands	Isole Vergini	Anne Abernathy	Luge	1
Israel	Israele	Galit Chait	Figure skating	5
Kazakhstan	Kazakistan	Aleksandr Koreshkov	Ice hockey	55
Kenya	Kenya	Phillip Boit	Cross-country skiing	1
Kyrgyzstan	Kirghizistan	Ivan Borisov	Alpine skiing	1
Latvia	Lettonia	Arturs Irbe	Ice hockey	57
Lebanon	Libano	Edmond Keiroue		3
Liechtenstein	Liechtenstein	Jessica Walter	Alpine skiing	5
Lithuania	Lituania	Vida Venciene	Chef de mission	7
Luxembourg	Lussemburgo	Fleur Maxwell	Figure skating	1
Madagascar	Madagascar	Mathieu Razanakolona	Alpine skiing	1
Republic of Moldova	Moldova	Natalia Levtchenkova	Biathlon	6
Monaco	Monaco	Patrice Servelle	Bobsleigh	4
Mongolia	Mongolia	Khash Erdene Khurelbaatar	Cross-country skiing	2
Nepal	Nepal	Dachhiri Sherpa	Cross-country skiing	1
Norway	Norvegia	Pål Trulsen	Curling	67
New Zealand	Nuova Zelanda	Sean Becker	Curling	15
Netherlands	Paesi Bassi	Jan Bos	Speed skating	33
Poland	Polonia	Paulina Ligocka	Snowboarding	45
Portugal	Portogallo	Danny Silva	Cross-country skiing	1
Romania	Romania	Gheorghe Chiper	Figure skating	25
Russian Federation	Russia	Dmitry Dorofeev	Speed skating	174
San Marino	San Marino	Marino Cardelli	Alpine skiing	1
Senegal	Senegal	Leyti Seck	Alpine skiing	1
Serbia and Montenegro	Serbia e Montenegro	Jelena Lolović	Alpine skiing	6
Slovakia	Slovacchia	Walter Marx	Luge	58
Slovenia	Slovenia	Tadeja Brankovič	Biathlon	36
Spain	Spagna	Maria Jose Rienda	Alpine skiing	16
United States of America	Stati Uniti d'America	Chris Witty	Speed skating	204
South Africa	Sud Africa	Alexander Heath	Alpine skiing	3
Sweden	Svezia	Anja Pärson	Alpine skiing	106
Switzerland	Svizzera	Philipp Schoch	Snowboarding	125
Tajikistan	Tagikistan	Andrei Drygin	Alpine skiing	1
Chinese Taipei	Taipei Cinese	Chih-Hung Ma	Luge	1
Thailand	Thailandia	Prawat Nagvajara	Cross-country skiing	1
Turkey	Turchia	Tuğba Karademir	Figure skating	6
Ukraine	Ucraina	Natalia Yakushenko	Luge	52
Hungary	Ungheria	Rozsa Darazs	Short track speed skating	19
Uzbekistan	Uzbekistan	Kayrat Ermetov	Alpine skiing	4
Venezuela	Venezuela	Werner Hoeger	Luge	1
Italy	Italia	Carolina Kostner	Figure skating	179

1. The 2006 games were the first winter games in which these countries have participated.
2. Yang Yang (A) was China's first female flag bearer for the Olympics.
3. These flag bearers are also citizens of Canada.
4. This young snowboarder replaced her older colleague Jagna Marczulajtis who was sick.

=== From Renaissance to Baroque ===
- Artistic, 16m
- 515 performers
- Direction and choreography: Monica Maimone
- Artistic direction: Valerio Festi
- Costumes: Gabriella Pescucci
- Segment coordinator: Nicola Tamburrano
- Producer: Alessandra Rossetti
- Set design: Roberto Rebaudengo
- Drammaturgy: Paolo Dalla Sega
- Flag wavers' coordinator: Stefano Mosele
- Flag wavers and musicians: F.I.SB. – Federazione Italiana Sbandieratori
- Original music: composed, arranged and orchestrated by Michele Centonze, in collaboration with Stefano Nanni

After a short homage to Dante and the Divine Comedy, there were Renaissance and Baroque displays, with an homage to Arcimboldo. One scene was based on the Botticelli painting The Birth of Venus. The role of Venus was played by Czech supermodel Eva Herzigová, emerging from a shell like in the painting. Dance played a major part in the ceremony, as well as displays of flag waving and baroque bands. Sportscaster Bob Costas called it a celebration of the emergence from the dark days of the Middle Ages, embracing the intellectual pursuits of art, literature and music.

=== From Futurism to Future ===
- Artistic, 9m 30s
- 205 performers and 24 bambolari
- Direction: Enzo Cosimi
- Futurist hero: Roberto Bolle
- Costumes and props: Daniela Dal Cin
- Segment coordinator: Nicola Tamburrano
- Set machine realization: Raoul Rossigni
- Music: composed and arranged by Ritchie Hawtin ("Substance Abuse" from the F.U.S.E. disc Dimension Intrusion)

The segment started with a modern ballet performance which led from a replica of Umberto Boccioni's sculpture "Unique Forms of Continuity in Space" to a celebration of Futurism. Roberto Bolle performed as lead in the dance part. He represented the futuristic hero, dancing with other mechanical dancers to show modernity, technology, and speed. The second part was performed by kung-fu athletes representing futuristic soldiers, while in the final section a group of bodybuilders pushed 6 motorbikes in the center of the stadium, thus emphasizing the role played by speed and technology in Futurism.

=== Pit Stop ===
- Artistic, about 4m
- Driver: Luca Badoer
- Note: this segment was kept secret before the Ceremony and is not reported in the official programme

Italian driver Luca Badoer drove the 2005 Ferrari F2005 car bearing only the Olympic Rings, Torino 2006 name and Italian tricolore to the centre of the stadium, performing 'donuts' and revving the V10 engine for a few minutes.

=== Words and Symbols ===
Address by the President of the Organising Committee

Address by the President of the International Olympic Committee

President of the Italian Republic: Opening of the Games

Olympic Anthem

Entry of the Olympic Flag

Olympic Oath

- Protocol, 20m
- 264 performers
- Choreography: Doug Jack
- Olympic flag coordinator: Nicoletta Mantovani
- Protocolcoordinator: Sigrid Guillion Mangilli
- Protocol segment Coordinator: Pamela Allvin

After the Parade of Nations had concluded and the athletes were gathered in the center of the stadium, two short speeches in Italian, French and English were delivered.

The first speech came from Valentino Castellani, the chief organizer of the Torino 2006 Olympic Games. He declared the industrial city "the world capital of sports" during the Olympics.

Valentino Castellani was followed by International Olympic Committee President Jacques Rogge, who told the Olympic athletes, "Your achievements will inspire and motivate future generations," before adding, "Please compete cleanly, without using doping." Rogge also hoped for peace during his short speech. "Our world today is in need of peace and brotherhood, the values of the Olympic Games," he said. "May these Games be held in peace in the true spirit of the Olympic Truce."

Rogge then introduced Italian President Carlo Azeglio Ciampi, who declared the games officially open.

Following the trend set from the selection of eight personalities representing the five continents and the three pillars of Olympism at the Salt Lake City Olympics Opening Ceremony, the flag was brought this time into the stadium by eight women:

- Sophia Loren, Italian born actress who was the patroness of the Ceremonies;
- Isabel Allende, Chilean novelist;
- Nawal El Moutawakel, member of the IOC from Morocco, the first Muslim woman to win an Olympic gold medal;
- Susan Sarandon, American actress and activist;
- Wangari Maathai, Nobel laureate and the founder of the Kenyan Green Belt Movement;
- Manuela Di Centa, Italian seven-time Nordic skiing gold medalist; She would later bestow the 50 km (Cross Country) Freestyle Gold Medal to her brother Giorgio Di Centa during the closing ceremony.
- Maria de Lurdes Mutola, gold medalist from Mozambique;
- Somaly Mam, Cambodian human rights activist.

Their walk with the flag was accompanied by Giuseppe Verdi's "Triumphant March," from Aida. The Olympic flag was then handed over to eight members of the Alpini, an Italian infantry unit, who raised the flag while the Olympic Hymn was played.

Italian skier Giorgio Rocca recited the Olympic Oath on behalf of all the athletes from the podium followed by Fabio Bianchetti from the International Skating Union reading the oath on behalf of all judges. There had been a major judging controversy in the figure skating event at the previous Winter Games.

=== Peace ===
The Dove

A Song of Peace

- Protocol, 6m
- 40 performers
- Direction and choreography: Ivan Manzoni
- Segment coordinator: Vichi Lombardo
- Original music: composed, arranged and orchestrated by Michele Centonze, in collaboration with Stefano Nanni

Twenty-eight acrobats climbed on a net set up on the main stage and executed their choreographed manoeuvres, spinning and flipping to the music. At the end of the routine they all came together and formed the shape of a dove, the symbol of peace, to a roaring cheer from the crowd.

Yoko Ono, dressed in white like many of the people in the ceremony (the spectators were provided with, and most wore, a white poncho, symbolizing the snow which makes the Winter Olympics possible), then entered and read a free verse poem from a prepared script calling for peace in the world. She called for "taking action" to spread peace. Ono's poem served as an introduction to a rendition of her late husband John Lennon's Imagine by Peter Gabriel.

=== Light the Passion ===
Arrival of the Flame

Lighting of the Cauldron

The Olympic System

- Protocol, 6m 20s
- Choreography: Doug Jack
- Cauldron and torch design: Pininfarina
- Original music: "Olimpia", composed, arranged and orchestrated by Michele Centonze

The Olympic Torch entered the stadium in the hand of alpine ski racer Alberto Tomba, who then passed the flame to the hands of the 1994 men's Italian cross-country skiing relay team (Marco Albarello, Giorgio Vanzetta, Maurilio De Zolt, and Silvio Fauner). The flame was then passed to Piero Gros, then Deborah Compagnoni before the Olympic Flame was lit by former Italian cross-country skier Stefania Belmondo. Belmondo paused to show the torch to the cheering crowd one last time before placing it on the arched lighting apparatus. The flame initiated a series of fireworks before lighting the top of the 57-meter high Olympic Flame, the highest in the history of the Olympic Games until that date.

=== Fortissimo ===
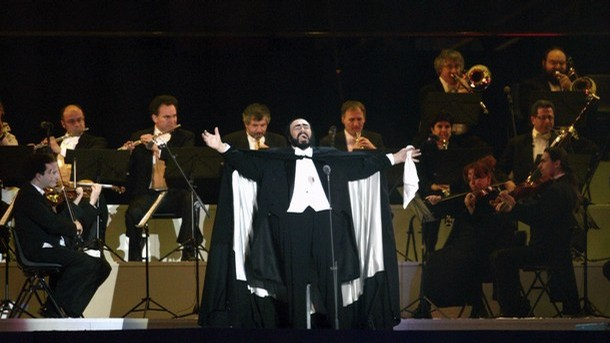
Luciano Pavarotti singing Nessun dorma, on his last public performance before his death

Allegro with Fire

- Artistic, 7min
- Direction: Marco Balich
- Chandelier design: Jacopo Foggini
- Pyrotechnical effects: Christophe Berthonneau
- Segment coordinator: Vichi Lombardo

After the largest curtain yet to be built revealed him on the stage, Italian tenor Luciano Pavarotti, wearing a black cape embroidered with silver Olympic rings, ended the ceremony by singing Giacomo Puccini's well-known aria Nessun Dorma from the opera Turandot, which ends with the victorious line "At dawn, I shall win!" Pavarotti's performance caused NBC Olympic commentator Brian Williams to proclaim "And the master brings the house down." The tenor's performance received the longest and loudest ovation of the opening ceremony from the international crowd. This would prove to be Pavarotti's final public performance of his signature aria.

After the curtains closed on Pavarotti, the ceremony properly ended with a fireworks display.

== Security measures ==
Security was present at the opening ceremony as has become the norm for the Olympics. Organizers stepped up the security measures in connection with the contemporary Jyllands-Posten Muhammad cartoons controversy and they insisted that the Olympic Games would be safe.

== Dignitaries and other officials in attendance ==
Aside from celebrities participating in the ceremonies, IOC President Jacques Rogge, members of the IOC, and many dignitaries and officials associated with the Olympic movement were in attendance (including 13 world leaders and two first ladies). They included:

- Kofi Annan, Secretary General of the United Nations
- (European Union) José Manuel Barroso, President of the European Commission
- (United Kingdom) Cherie Blair, wife of then-British Prime Minister Tony Blair
- Laura Bush, First Lady of the United States, and her daughter Barbara
- (Greece) Gianna Angelopoulos-Daskalaki, president of the Athens Organizing Committee for the Olympic Games
- Besir Atalay, Deputy Prime Minister of Turkey
- Harald V, King of Norway and Queen Sonja
- Carl XVI Gustaf, King of Sweden
- Frederik, Crown Prince of Denmark (representing the Queen of Denmark)
- Albert II, Sovereign Prince of Monaco
- Henri, Hereditary Grand Duke of Luxembourg
- Horst Köhler, Federal President of Germany
- Jean-Pierre Raffarin, Prime Minister of France
- Kazimierz Marcinkiewicz, Prime Minister of Poland
- Carlo Azeglio Ciampi, President of Italy
- Willem-Alexander, Prince of Orange, Crown Prince of the Netherlands (representing the Queen of the Netherlands)
- Juan Carlos I, King of Spain
- (United States) Mitt Romney, President of the Salt Lake Organizing Committee for the Olympic and Paralympic Winter Games of 2002 and Governor of Massachusetts
- Tarja Halonen, President of Finland and Premier Matti Vanhanen
- Ivan Gasparovic, President of Slovakia
- Paul Kagame, President of Rwanda
- Otmar Hasler, Prime Minister of Liechtenstein
- Michaelle Jean, Governor General of Canada
  - Gordon Campbell, Premier of British Columbia, host Canadian province of the 2010 Winter Olympics
- Rita Levi-Montalcini, Nobel Prize winning physiologist and Italian senator-for-life
- Luca di Montezemolo, president and CEO of Ferrari and chairman of FIAT

Italian prime minister Silvio Berlusconi was absent. However, he attended the closing ceremony on 26 February.

== See also ==
- 2006 Winter Olympics closing ceremony
