= Macedonia at the 2018 Winter Olympics =

- Flag of the Republic of Macedonia
- IOC code: MKD
- NOC: Olympic Committee of North Macedonia
- Website: www.mok.org.mk (in Macedonian)

in Pyeongchang, South Korea 9–25 February 2018
- Competitors: 3 (2 men and 1 woman) in 2 sports
- Flag bearer: Stavre Jada
- Medals: Gold 0 Silver 0 Bronze 0 Total 0

Winter Olympics appearances (overview)
- 1998; 2002; 2006; 2010; 2014; 2018; 2022; 2026

Other related appearances
- Yugoslavia (1924–1992)

Macedonia competed at the 2018 Winter Olympics in Pyeongchang, South Korea, from 9 to 25 February 2018. The country's participation in Pyeongchang marked its sixth appearance in the Winter Olympics after its debut at the 1998 Winter Olympics.

Macedonia was represented by three athletes who competed across two sports. Stavre Jada served as the country's flag-bearer during the opening ceremony and a volunteer carried the flag during the closing ceremony. Macedonia did not win any medals in the Games. This is the last Olympic Games that the nation participated at before its name was changed to North Macedonia.

== Background ==
Athletes from Montenegro competed for Yugoslavia earlier from 1924 to 1988. After its independence from Yugoslavia on 8 September 1991, its National Olympic Committee was formed in 1992. The Olympic Committee of North Macedonia was recognized by the International Olympic Committee (IOC) in 1993. The 1996 Summer Olympics marked Macedonia's first participation as an independent nation in the Olympic Games. After the nation made its debut in the Winter Olympics at the 1998 Winter Games, this edition of the Games in 2018 marked the nation's sixth appearance at the Winter Games.

The 2018 Winter Olympics were held in Pyeongchang, South Korea between 9 and 25 February 2018. Macedonia was represented by three athletes. Stavre Jada served as the country's flag-bearer during the opening ceremony, and a volunteer carried the flag during the closing ceremony. Macedonia did not win a medal in the Games.

== Competitors ==
The following is the list of number of competitors participating in the delegation per sport.

Sport	Men	Women	Total
Alpine skiing	1	0	1
Cross-country skiing	1	1	2
Total	2	1	3

== Alpine skiing ==
Macedonia qualified one male alpine skier. This was the third consecutive Winter Games appearance for Antonio Ristevski after he made his debut at the 2010 Winter Olympics.

The Alpine skiing events were held at the Jeongseon Alpine Centre in Bukpyeong. The course for the events was designed by former Olympic champion Bernhard Russi. The weather was cold and windy during the events, and it was the coldest since the 1994 Winter Olympics at Lillehammer. Ristevski did not finish in both the men's giant slalom and men's slalom events.

Athlete	Event	Run 1		Run 2		Total	
Athlete	Event	Time	Rank	Time	Rank	Time	Rank
Antonio Ristevski	Men's giant slalom	DNF					
Antonio Ristevski	Men's slalom	DNF					

== Cross-country skiing ==
As per the standards laid down by the International Ski Federation, athletes with a maximum of 300 points in the stipulated period were allowed to compete in the distance event. Macedonia qualified two athletes, one male and one female.

The main events were held at the Alpensia Cross-Country Skiing Centre. Flag-bearer Jada completed the 15 km (9.3 mi) course in 42:14.2. He finished the race in 99th position (out of 119 competitors), more than eight minutes behind the winner, Dario Cologna of Switzerland. In the men's sprint events, he clocked a time of over four minutes and 23 seconds, to finish 79th amongst the 80 participants in the qualifiers, and did not advance to the next round. In the women's 10 km freestyle, Viktorija Todorovska finished 85th amongst the 90 participants. She finished nearly eight minutes behind the winner Ragnhild Haga of Norway.

Distance

Athlete	Event	Final		
Athlete	Event	Time	Deficit	Rank
Stavre Jada	Men's 15 km freestyle	42:14.2	+8:30.3	99
Viktorija Todorovska	Women's 10 km freestyle	32:57.6	+7:57.1	85

Sprint

Athlete	Event	Qualification		Quarterfinal		Semifinal		Final	
Athlete	Event	Time	Rank	Time	Rank	Time	Rank	Time	Rank
Stavre Jada	Men's sprint	4:23.85	79	Did not advance					

== See also ==
- Macedonia at the 2018 Summer Youth Olympics
