= Corduneanu =

Corduneanu is a surname. Notable people with the surname include:

- Andreea Corduneanu (born 1995), Romanian women's football defender
- Constantin Corduneanu (1928–2018), Romanian-American mathematician and professor
- Constantin Corduneanu (wrestler) (1969–2024), Romanian freestyle wrestler
- Corina Claudia Corduneanu (born 1988), Romanian tennis player
- Gheorghe Corduneanu (born 1976), Romanian wrestler
