= North Macedonia at the 2026 Winter Olympics =

- Flag of North Macedonia
- IOC code: MKD
- NOC: Olympic Committee of North Macedonia
- Website: www.mok.org.mk (in Macedonian)

in Milan and Cortina d'Ampezzo, Italy 6 February 2026 – 22 February 2026
- Competitors: 4 (2 men and 2 women) in 2 sports
- Flag bearers (opening): Stavre Jada & Jana Atanasovska
- Flag bearer (closing): Volunteer
- Medals: Gold 0 Silver 0 Bronze 0 Total 0

Winter Olympics appearances (overview)
- 1998; 2002; 2006; 2010; 2014; 2018; 2022; 2026

Other related appearances
- Yugoslavia (1924–1992)

North Macedonia competed at the 2026 Winter Olympics in Milan and Cortina d'Ampezzo, Italy, from 6 to 22 February 2026.

Stavre Jada and Jana Atanasovska were the country's flagbearer during the opening ceremony. Meanwhile, a volunteer was the country's flagbearer during the closing ceremony.

== Competitors ==
The following is the list of number of competitors participating at the Games per sport/discipline.

Sport	Men	Women	Total
Alpine skiing	1	1	2
Cross-country skiing	1	1	2
Total	2	2	4

== Alpine skiing ==
North Macedonia qualified one male and one female alpine skier through the basic quota.

Athlete	Event	Run 1		Run 2		Total	
Athlete	Event	Time	Rank	Time	Rank	Time	Rank
Viktor Petkov	Men's giant slalom	1:27.36	57	1:21.01	57	2:48.37	55
Jana Atanasovska	Women's giant slalom	DNF					
Jana Atanasovska	Women's slalom	DNF					

== Cross-country skiing ==
North Macedonia qualified one male cross-country skier through the basic quota. Following the completion of the 2025–26 FIS Cross-Country World Cup in the first World Cup period (28 November – 14 December 2025), North Macedonia qualified a further one female athlete.

Distance

Athlete	Event	Final		
Athlete	Event	Time	Deficit	Rank
Stavre Jada	Men's 10 km freestyle	25:28.9	+4:52.7	83
Ana Cvetanovska	Women's 10 km freestyle	31:32.4	+8:43.2	105

Sprint

Athlete	Event	Qualification		Quarterfinal		Semifinal		Final	
Athlete	Event	Time	Rank	Time	Rank	Time	Rank	Time	Rank
Stavre Jada	Men's sprint	3:59.56	89	Did not advance					

== See also ==
- North Macedonia at the 2026 Winter Paralympics
