= 1996 Asian Wrestling Championships =

- Host city: Xiaoshan, China
- Dates: 4–10 April 1996

Champions
- Freestyle: Iran
- Greco-Roman: South Korea
- Women: Japan

The 1996 Asian Wrestling Championships were held in Xiaoshan, China. The event took place from April 4 to April 10, 1996. It acted as the Asian qualifying tournament for the 1996 Summer Olympics wrestling tournament.

The first women's tournament was an open competition, an American wrestler Tricia Saunders was the only non-Asian wrestler in competition and won the gold.

== Medal table ==
Rank	Nation	Gold	Silver	Bronze	Total
1	Japan	8	5	5	18
2	South Korea	5	5	1	11
3	Kazakhstan	4	2	3	9
4	Iran	3	1	6	10
5	Uzbekistan	3	1	2	6
6	China	2	5	3	10
7	North Korea	2	1	0	3
8	Syria	1	0	0	1
–	United States	1	0	0	1
9	Chinese Taipei	0	5	3	8
10	Mongolia	0	3	0	3
11	Turkmenistan	0	1	0	1
12	Kyrgyzstan	0	0	3	3
13	Philippines	0	0	2	2
Totals (13 entries)		29	29	28	86

== Team ranking ==
Rank	Men's freestyle		Men's Greco-Roman		Women's freestyle	
Rank	Team	Points	Team	Points	Team	Points
1	Iran	78	South Korea	83	Japan	87
2	South Korea	70	China	71	Chinese Taipei	76
3	Japan	66	Kazakhstan	70	China	45
4	Uzbekistan	59	Japan	68	Philippines	22
5	Mongolia	51	Uzbekistan		Kazakhstan	15

== Medal summary ==
=== Men's freestyle ===
Event	Gold	Silver	Bronze
48 kg	Kim Il; North Korea	Luvsan-Ishiin Sergelenbaatar; Mongolia	Vladimir Torgovkin; Kyrgyzstan
52 kg	Adkhamjon Achilov; Uzbekistan	Hideo Sasayama; Japan	Behnam Tayyebi; Iran
57 kg	Ri Yong-sam; North Korea	Tserenbaataryn Tsogtbayar; Mongolia	Mohammad Talaei; Iran
62 kg	Takahiro Wada; Japan	Jang Jae-sung; South Korea	Abbas Hajkenari; Iran
68 kg	Boris Budaev; Uzbekistan	Hwang Sang-ho; South Korea	Amir Tavakkolian; Iran
74 kg	Park Jang-soon; South Korea	Magomed Kurugliyev; Kazakhstan	Issa Momeni; Iran
82 kg	Ruslan Khinchagov; Uzbekistan	Yang Hyung-mo; South Korea	Alireza Heidari; Iran
90 kg	Rasoul Khadem; Iran	Islam Bayramukov; Kazakhstan	Tatsuo Kawai; Japan
100 kg	Abbas Jadidi; Iran	Dolgorsürengiin Sumiyaabazar; Mongolia	Konstantin Aleksandrov; Kyrgyzstan
130 kg	Ebrahim Mehraban; Iran	Feng Aigang; China	Igor Klimov; Kazakhstan

=== Men's Greco-Roman ===
Event	Gold	Silver	Bronze
48 kg	Sim Kwon-ho; South Korea	Kang Yong-gyun; North Korea	Hiroshi Kado; Japan
52 kg	Khaled Al-Faraj; Syria	Ha Tae-yeon; South Korea	Shamsiddin Khudoyberdiev; Uzbekistan
57 kg	Yuriy Melnichenko; Kazakhstan	Kenkichi Nishimi; Japan	Sheng Zetian; China
62 kg	Choi Sang-sun; South Korea	Ahad Pazaj; Iran	Hu Guohong; China
68 kg	Son Sang-pil; South Korea	Grigori Pulyaev; Uzbekistan	Yasushi Miyake; Japan
74 kg	Kim Jin-soo; South Korea	Takamitsu Katayama; Japan	Bakhtiyar Baiseitov; Kazakhstan
82 kg	Daulet Turlykhanov; Kazakhstan	Park Myung-suk; South Korea	Raatbek Sanatbayev; Kyrgyzstan
90 kg	Sergey Matviyenko; Kazakhstan	Rozy Rejepow; Turkmenistan	Eom Jin-han; South Korea
100 kg	Anatoly Fedorenko; Kazakhstan	Ba Yanchuan; China	Takashi Nonomura; Japan
130 kg	Liu Guoke; China	Kenichi Suzuki; Japan	Shermukhammad Kuziev; Uzbekistan

=== Women's freestyle ===
Event	Gold	Silver	Bronze
44 kg	Shoko Yoshimura; Japan	Chiu Jui-fen; Chinese Taipei	Cristina Villanueva; Philippines
47 kg	Miho Adachi; Japan	Zhong Xiue; China	Chang Wen-hsia; Chinese Taipei
50 kg	Tricia Saunders; United States	Kozue Kimura; Japan	Liu Hongmei; China
53 kg	Ryoko Sakae; Japan	Huang Chiu-yueh; Chinese Taipei	Gemma Silverio; Philippines
57 kg	Mariko Shimizu; Japan	Huang Chia-chi; Chinese Taipei	Svetlana Volkova; Kazakhstan
61 kg	Mikiko Miyazaki; Japan	Kong Yan; China	Huang Wan-ling; Chinese Taipei
65 kg	Yayoi Urano; Japan	Wang Chaoli; China	Wu Huei-li; Chinese Taipei
70 kg	Kyoko Hamaguchi; Japan	Lee Yen-hiu; Chinese Taipei	None awarded
75 kg	Liu Dongfeng; China	Sha Ling-li; Chinese Taipei	Reiko Sumiya; Japan
