= Studio Festi =

Studio Festi Srl
- Type: Private
- Industry: Performing Arts
- Founded: 1982
- Founder: Valerio Festi and Monica Maimone
- Headquarters: Varese, Italy
- Area served: Worldwide
- Key people: Valerio Festi, President
- Number of employees: 50
- Subsidiaries: Studio Festi do Brasil
- Website: www.studiofesti.com

Studio Festi is an Italian artistic project and production centre bringing into being shows and grand installations. Founded in 1982, by Valerio Festi and Monica Maimone, Studio Festi operates from its main offices in Velate (Varese, Italy), its workshop in Venegono Superiore (Varese) and, in 2010, it set up a branch in São Paulo, Brazil.

Studio Festi's artistic activity covers three main areas:

- outdoor shows
- installations of lights, also called architectures of light due to their unique features
- concerts for fireworks with live orchestra

The poetry characterising Studio Festi's work is linked to a reinterpretation of traditional city festivals through the invention of stage machines that take inspiration from the Italian Baroque and through the representation of ancient rituals like that of the Italian "parata" (parade).

Studio Festi has organized large-scale celebrative events in many Italian cities as well as internationally.

== Works ==
- La luce italiana, lights architecture in the occasion of Italy in Houston 1987
- Antigone delle città, Bologna, Italy, 1991–1992
- Se in Trentino d'estate un castello, 1994

L'Angelo e il Cavaliere, Castello di Stenico, Trento, Italy
Il viaggio di Yonec, Castello di Avio, Trento, Italy
L'incantesimo dei quattro narratori, Castello di Stenico, Trento, Italy

- Festino di Santa Rosalia, Palermo, 1995, 1996, 1997, 2001
- Kobe Lights architecture, Kobe, 1995–2010, memorial of the 1995 Great Hanshin earthquake
- I Pianeti (The Planets), by Gustav Holst, opening gala concert of 41st Festival dei Due Mondi in Spoleto (Italy), 1998
- Concerto per fuochi d'artificio (Concert for fireworks), Rome, 1999, Accademia Nazionale di Santa Cecilia Orchestra, conducted by Myung-whun Chung, in Saint Peter's Square at Vatican City in occasion of the inauguration of the renovated facade of St. Peter's Basilica
- La città della luce – L'illuminazione delle porte della città (Artistic illumination of the gates of Bologna), Bologna, 1999
- Tokyo Millenario, Tokyo, 1999–2005
- La Creazione (The Creation), by Joseph Haydn, Jubilee celebration concert, Spoleto Festival 2000
- L'ultimo angelo. Un'elegia per il paradiso perduto, Spoleto, Spoleto Festival 2000
- Una festa barocca (Baroque celebration), Lisbon, 2000, Festival dos Oceanos de Lisboa
- La luce degli angeli (Angels' light), Moscow, 2001
- La festa del cielo (Celebration of the Sky), Tokyo, 2001
- Heaven and Earth, Beijing, 2002, lights architecture
- De los àngeles y de la luz, Bogotá, 2002, closing show of VIII Ibero-American Theater Festival (Festival Iberoamericano de teatro de Bogotá)
- Robe de Lumière, Paris, Galeries Lafayette, 2002–2010, Christmas light architecture
- Christmas de-light, Istanbul, Akmerkez shopping mall, 2003–2008, Christmas light architecture
- Of Angels and Light

Sydney, 2004, Sydney Festival–Sydney Olympic Park
Colorado Springs, Colorado, 2004

- Il Mandarino Meraviglioso (The Miraculous Mandarin) by Béla Bartók, L'apprendista stregone (The Sorcerer's Apprentice) by Paul Dukas, Quadri di un'esposizione (Pictures at an Exhibition) by Modest Mussorgsky (orchestration: Maurice Ravel), opening concert of Festival dei Due Mondi 2004 in Spoleto
- La caída de los ángeles, Bogotá, 2004, X Ibero-American Theater Festival (Festival Iberoamericano de teatro de Bogotá)
- Fuochi di gioia e di allegrezza (Fireworks of joy and happiness), Bilbao, 2004
- Cabalgata de Reyes, Madrid, 2005, 2006 2008, 2009
- The Dancing Sky, Adelaide, 2006, Adelaide Festival of Arts
- The Renewal of Time, Beijing, 2006
- Dal Rinascimento al Barocco (From Renaissance to Baroque), Turin, 2006, part of the 2006 Winter Olympics opening ceremony in Turin
- Special Olympics European Youth Games Opening Ceremony, Rome, 2006
- "Columbus Day Parade", New York, 2006
- Smart Night, Bologna, 2006
- Fenerbahçe Spor Kulübü 1907–2007, Istanbul
- Summer Glory, Rome, 2007, 2008, 2009
- The dream of Assol, Saint Petersburg, 2007, on the occasion of Scarlet Sails celebrations
- La nascita della bellezza (The birth of beauty), Rome, 2007, the show was part of the celebrations for the 45th anniversary of Valentino Garavani's career. The evening is witnessed by Valentino: The Last Emperor, a feature-length documentary produced and directed by Matt Tyrnauer
- Deluge (The flood), Laikipia (Kenya), 2008
- The Beauty of Harmony, Macao, 2008
- Munich Revue, Munich, Germany, 2008, 850th anniversary of the city
- La Città giardino sul tetto del mondo (The garden town on the top of the world), Varese, 2008, opening ceremony of UCI Road World Championships
- The Dancing Sky, Singapore, 2008
- Le rideau se lève (The Curtain Rises), Damascus, 2008, Opening ceremony of Damascus 2008 Arab Capital of Culture
- Pianeti (Planets), Mexico, 2009, touring show, Festival Internacional Cervantino 2009.
- Sinfonia degli oceani (Symphony of the Oceans), Rome, 2009, opening ceremony of 2009 World Aquatics Championships
- Turkish State Theatres Sabancı International Adana Theatre Festival, 2010, 2011, 2012, opening show.
- Ensaio Sobre a Beleza, Rio de Janeiro, 2011, opening show of Momento Italia Brasil – Italian Year in Brazil.
