= Felipe Guzmán =

Felipe Guzmán may refer to:

- Felipe Segundo Guzmán (1879–1932), Bolivian president, 1925–1926
- Felipe Guzmán (wrestler) (born 1967), Mexican former wrestler
