= Kozyr =

Kozyr (Ukrainian: Козир; Belarusian: Козыр) is a Ukrainian and Belarusian surname. Notable people with the surname include:

- Aleksandr Kozyr (1903–1961), Soviet-Ukrainian film producer
- Artsem Kozyr (born 1990), Belarusian sprint canoeist
- Igor Kozyr (born 1966), Belarusian wrestler
- Valentyna Kozyr (born 1950), Soviet-Ukrainian athlete
