= Canoeing at the 1996 Summer Olympics – Men's slalom C-1 =

Men's slalom C-1 at the Games of the XXVI Olympiad
- Venue: Ocoee Whitewater Center
- Dates: 27 July 1996
- Competitors: 30 from 18 nations

Medalists
1st place, gold medalist(s)		Michal Martikán	Slovakia
2nd place, silver medalist(s)		Lukáš Pollert	Czech Republic
3rd place, bronze medalist(s)		Patrice Estanguet	France

These are the results of the men's C-1 slalom competition in canoeing at the 1996 Summer Olympics. The C-1 (canoe single) event is raced by one-man canoes through a whitewater course. The venue for the 1996 Olympic competition was on the Toccoa/Ocoee River near the Georgia-Tennessee state line.

== Medalists ==
Gold	Silver	Bronze
Michal Martikán (SVK)	Lukáš Pollert (CZE)	Patrice Estanguet (FRA)

== Results ==
The 30 competitors each took two runs through the whitewater slalom course on July 27. The best time of the two runs counted for the event.

Rank	Name	Run 1			Run 2			Result
Rank	Name	Time	Points	Total	Time	Points	Total	Total
Gold	Michal Martikán (SVK)	160.88	0	160.88	151.03	0	151.03	151.03
Silver	Lukáš Pollert (CZE)	151.17	0	151.17	158.25	20	178.25	151.17
Bronze	Patrice Estanguet (FRA)	152.84	0	152.84	150.89	10	160.89	152.84
4	Gareth Marriott (GBR)	155.83	0	155.83	154.14	5	159.14	155.83
5	Hervé Delamarre (FRA)	155.98	0	155.98	168.77	10	178.77	155.98
6	Emmanuel Brugvin (FRA)	158.28	5	163.28	151.71	5	156.71	156.71
7	Martin Lang (GER)	154.91	5	159.91	157.24	10	167.24	159.91
8	Ryszard Mordarski (POL)	156.00	5	161.00	156.86	5	161.86	161.00
9	David Hearn (USA)	159.07	5	164.07	157.51	5	162.51	162.51
10	Mike Corcoran (IRL)	162.90	0	162.90	163.61	10	173.61	162.90
11	Mariusz Wieczorek (POL)	159.21	5	164.21	176.17	5	181.17	164.21
12	Vitus Husek (GER)	162.48	5	167.48	159.29	5	164.29	164.29
13	Renato de Monti (ITA)	168.75	50	218.75	160.03	5	165.03	165.03
14	Mark Delaney (GBR)	161.52	5	166.52	155.67	10	165.67	165.67
15	Juraj Minčík (SVK)	182.60	0	182.60	161.45	5	166.45	166.45
16	Justin Boocock (AUS)	161.96	5	166.96	170.08	5	175.08	166.96
17	Sören Kaufmann (GER)	158.43	10	168.43	162.25	15	177.25	168.43
18	Larry Norman (CAN)	176.57	10	186.57	170.12	0	170.12	170.12
19	Adam Clawson (USA)	157.53	15	172.53	165.74	100	265.74	172.53
20	Pavel Janda (CZE)	167.71	10	177.91	185.55	55	240.55	177.91
21	Toni Herreros (ESP)	174.38	5	179.38	183.83	115	298.83	179.38
22	Masanari Mochida (JPN)	175.45	5	180.45	205.69	10	215.69	180.45
23	Leonardo Selbach (BRA)	206.51	10	216.51	179.54	5	184.54	184.54
24	Gregor Terdič (SLO)	182.79	5	187.79	194.08	5	199.08	187.79
25	Stephen O'Flaherty (IRL)	178.65	10	188.75	195.73	25	220.73	188.75
26	Francesco Stefani (ITA)	162.63	300	462.63	169.60	20	189.60	189.60
27	Danila Kuznetsov (RUS)	213.36	60	273.36	176.06	50	226.06	226.06
28	Simon Hočevar (SLO)	197.90	55	252.90	166.00	65	231.00	231.00
29	Danko Herceg (CRO)	163.07	305	468.07	165.94	110	275.94	275.94
30	Nenad Trpovski (MKD)	191.19	125	316.19	No time	-	Did not finish	316.19
