= Stephen O'Flaherty =

Irish canoeist

Personal information
- Nationality: Irish
- Born: April 4, 1970 (age 56)

Stephen O'Flaherty (born April 4, 1970) is an Irish slalom canoer who competed in the early to mid-1990s. He finished 25th in the C-1 event at the 1996 Summer Olympics in Atlanta.
