= Danila Kuznetsov =

Russian canoeist (born 1976)

Danila Kuznetsov (Russian: Данила Кузнецов; born 10 December 1976) is a Russian slalom canoeist who competed in the mid- to late-1990s. He finished 27th in the C-1 event at the 1996 Summer Olympics in Atlanta.
