= North Macedonia at the Olympics =

- Flag of North Macedonia
- IOC code: MKD
- NOC: Olympic Committee of North Macedonia
- Website: www.mok.org.mk (in Macedonian)
- Medals Ranked 134th: Gold 0 Silver 1 Bronze 1 Total 2

Summer appearances
- 1996; 2000; 2004; 2008; 2012; 2016; 2020; 2024

Winter appearances
- 1998; 2002; 2006; 2010; 2014; 2018; 2022; 2026

Other related appearances
- Yugoslavia (1920–1988); Independent Olympic Participants (1992)

North Macedonia first competed as an independent nation at the Olympic Games at the 1996 Summer Olympics, then as the "former Yugoslav Republic of Macedonia", and has participated in every Summer Olympic Games and Winter Olympic Games since then. Previously, until 1988, Macedonian athletes competed for Yugoslavia, and in 1992 as Independent Olympic Participants. The provisional appellation of "former Yugoslav Republic of Macedonia" was used until 2018, in the context of the Macedonia naming dispute.

== Medal tables ==
=== Medals by Summer Games ===
Games	Athletes	Gold	Silver	Bronze	Total	Rank
1920–1988	as part of Yugoslavia					
1992 Barcelona	as part of the Independent Olympic Participants					
1996 Atlanta	11	0	0	0	0	–
2000 Sydney	10	0	0	1	1	71
2004 Athens	10	0	0	0	0	–
2008 Beijing	7	0	0	0	0	–
2012 London	4	0	0	0	0	–
2016 Rio de Janeiro	6	0	0	0	0	–
2020 Tokyo	8	0	1	0	1	77
2024 Paris	6	0	0	0	0	–
2028 Los Angeles	future event					
2032 Brisbane	future event					
Total		0	1	1	2	134

=== Medals by Winter Games ===
Games	Athletes	Gold	Silver	Bronze	Total	Rank
1924–1992	as part of Yugoslavia					
1994 Lillehammer	did not participate					
1998 Nagano	3	0	0	0	0	–
2002 Salt Lake City	2	0	0	0	0	–
2006 Turin	3	0	0	0	0	–
2010 Vancouver	3	0	0	0	0	–
2014 Sochi	3	0	0	0	0	–
2018 Pyeongchang	3	0	0	0	0	–
2022 Beijing	3	0	0	0	0	–
2026 Milano Cortina	4	0	0	0	0	–
2030 French Alps	future event					
2034 Utah	future event					
Total		0	0	0	0	–

=== Medals by summer sport ===
Sport	Gold	Silver	Bronze	Total
Taekwondo	0	1	0	1
Wrestling	0	0	1	1
Totals (2 entries)	0	1	1	2

== List of medalists ==
Two athletes representing North Macedonia since 1996 have won an Olympic medal.

Medal	Name	Games	Sport	Event
Bronze	Magomed Ibragimov	2000 Sydney	Wrestling	Men's freestyle 85 kg
Silver	Dejan Georgievski	2020 Tokyo	Taekwondo	Men's +80 kg

== List of Yugoslav medalists from SR Macedonia ==
Several other athletes from the Socialist Republic of Macedonia (a constituent country of the former SFR Yugoslavia) have also won Olympic medals, competing for Yugoslavia.

Medal	Name	Games	Sport	Event
Silver	Blagoja Vidinić	1956 Melbourne	Football	Men's team
Gold	Blagoja Vidinić	1960 Rome	Football	Men's team
Silver	Blagoja Georgievski	1976 Montreal	Basketball	Men's team
Bronze	Ace Rusevski	1976 Montreal	Boxing	Men's lightweight
Bronze	Shaban Sejdiu	1980 Moscow	Wrestling	Men's freestyle lightweight
Gold	Shaban Tërstena	1984 Los Angeles	Wrestling	Men's freestyle flyweight
Silver	Redžep Redžepovski	1984 Los Angeles	Boxing	Men's flyweight
Bronze	Milko Đurovski	1984 Los Angeles	Football	Men's team
Bronze	Shaban Sejdiu	1984 Los Angeles	Wrestling	Men's freestyle welterweight
Silver	Stojna Vangelovska	1988 Seoul	Basketball	Women's team
Silver	Shaban Tërstena	1988 Seoul	Wrestling	Men's freestyle 52 kg

== See also ==
- List of flag bearers for North Macedonia at the Olympics
- North Macedonia at the Paralympics
