= Victor Peicov =

Moldovan wrestler

Personal information
- Nationality: Moldovan
- Born: 16 October 1965 (age 60)

Sport
- Sport: Wrestling

Victor Peicov (born 16 October 1965) is a Moldovan wrestler. He competed in the men's freestyle 74 kg at the 1996 Summer Olympics.
