= Turan Ceylan =

Turkish wrestler (born 1968)

Personal information
- Nationality: Turkish
- Born: 12 June 1968 (age 58) Tokat, Turkey

Sport
- Sport: Wrestling
Medal record
Men's freestyle wrestling
Representing Turkey
World Championships
Gold medal – first place	1994 Istanbul	74 kg
European Championships
Silver medal – second place	1995 Fribourg	74 kg
Silver medal – second place	1994 Rome	74 kg
Mediterranean Games
Gold medal – first place	1991 Athens	74 kg
Grand Prix of Germany
Gold medal – first place	1996 Leipzig	74 kg
Silver medal – second place	1994 Wiesental	74 kg

Turan Ceylan (born 12 June 1968) is a Turkish former wrestler. He competed in the men's freestyle 74 kg at the 1996 Summer Olympics.
