= Sailing Federation of North Macedonia =

- IOC nation: Macedonia
- Sport: Sailing
- Official website: www.efm.mk

AFFILIATIONS
- International federation: International Sailing Federation (ISAF)
- Continental association: EUROSAF
- National Olympic Committee: Olympic Committee of North Macedonia

ELECTED
- President: Ljupco Pop-Stefanija

FINANCE
- Company status: Association

The Sailing Federation of North Macedonia (Macedonian: Едриличарска Федерација на Македонија, romanized: Edriličarska Federacija na Makedonija) is the national governing body for the sport of sailing in North Macedonia, recognised by the International Sailing Federation.
