= Larry Norman (canoeist) =

Canadian slalom canoeist (born 1966)

Lawrence Norman (born April 5, 1966) is a Canadian slalom canoeist who competed from the late 1980s to the late 1990s. Competing in two Summer Olympics, he earned his best finish of 18th in the C-1 event in Atlanta in 1996.
