= Nikos Tskouaseli =

Greek wrestler

Personal information
- Nationality: Greek
- Born: 2 March 1970 (age 56)

Sport
- Sport: Wrestling

Nikos Tskouaseli (born 2 March 1970) is a Greek wrestler. He competed in the men's freestyle 48 kg at the 1996 Summer Olympics.
