= Luvsan-Ishiin Sergelenbaatar =

Mongolian wrestler

Personal information
- Nationality: Mongolian
- Born: 3 December 1967 (age 58)
- Height: 160 cm (5 ft 3 in)
- Weight: 57 kg (126 lb)

Sport
- Sport: Freestyle Wrestling
- Weight class: 48-52 kg
Medal record
Men's freestyle wrestling
Representing Mongolia
Asian Wrestling Championships
Gold medal – first place	1993 Ulaanbaatar	52 kg
Silver medal – second place	1996 Xiaoshan	48 kg
Golden Grand Prix Ivan Yarygin
Gold medal – first place	1991 Krasnoyarsk	48 kg
Espoir World Championships
Bronze medal – third place	1989 Ulaanbaatar	48 kg
Junior World Championships
Silver medal – second place	1988 Wolfurt	50 kg

Luvsan-Ishiin Sergelenbaatar (born 3 December 1967) is a Mongolian wrestler. He competed in the men's freestyle 48 kg at the 1996 Summer Olympics.

== Results of 1991 Golden Grand Prix Ivan Yarygin ==
Sources:

- Gold - Luvsan-Ishiin Sergelenbaatar.
- Silver - 1986 USSR Peoples' Spartakiad Runner-up Radik Badretdinov.
- Bronze - World Champion Vugar Orujov.
- 4th place - Herman Kantoyeu.
- 5th place - 1987 Soviet Union National Cup Champion Yuri Mamyshev, who had previously beaten reigning Olympic champion Takashi Kobayashi at the 1990 Alexander Medved Prizes International Tournament.

== Results of 1993 Asian Championship ==
Sources:

- Gold - Luvsan-Ishiin Sergelenbaatar.
- Silver - 1992 Olympic Champion Ri Hak-son.
- Bronze - 1992 World Cup Champion Nasser Zeinalnia.
- 4th place - 1990 USSR National Cup Champion Maulen Mamyrov.
- 5th place - Dun Dege.
