= Isaac Jacob =

Nigerian wrestler (born 1973)

Personal information
- Nationality: Nigerian
- Born: 25 October 1973 (age 52)

Sport
- Sport: Wrestling

Isaac Jacob (born 25 October 1973) is a Nigerian former wrestler. He competed in the men's freestyle 48 kg at the 1996 Summer Olympics.
