= Ivana Ivčevska =

Macedonian skier (born 1988)

Personal information
- Nationality: Macedonian
- Born: 15 October 1988 (age 36); Skopje, Yugoslavia

Sport
- Sport: Alpine skiing

Ivana Ivčevska (born 15 October 1988) is a Macedonian alpine skier. She competed in two events at the 2006 Winter Olympics.
