= Rob Eiter =

American wrestler and coach (born 1967)

Personal information
- Born: September 12, 1967 (age 58) Chicago, Illinois, U.S.
- Height: 5 ft 2 in (157 cm)
- Weight: 48 kg (106 lb)

Sport
- Country: United States
- Sport: Wrestling
- Events: Freestyle and Folkstlye
- College team: Arizona State
- Club: Sunkist Kids Wrestling Club
- Team: USA
Medal record
Men's freestyle wrestling
Representing the United States
World Cup
Silver medal – second place	1992 Moscow	48 kg
Silver medal – second place	1994 Edmonton	48 kg

Rob Eiter (born September 12, 1967) is an American Olympic wrestler. He competed in the 1996 Summer Olympics in Atlanta, Georgia, where he wrestled in the 48 kilogram (105 pound) weight class. He wrestled for Sunkist Wrestling Club and attended Arizona State University, where he wrestled under Bobby Douglas. He became head wrestling coach of the University of Pennsylvania in 2008. He was the assistant wrestling coach at the University of Maryland.

== Accomplishments ==
Wrestling

- Five time US Open National Champion
- Two time World Cup silver medalist
- Member of 1993 and 1995 World Championship teams
- Member of 1996 Olympic team

Coaching

- Coached the 1999 women's World Championship team
- Assistant at Clarion University from 1993 to 1998
- Assistant at Northwestern University
- Head coach at University of Pennsylvania
- Previously Assistant Coach at University of Maryland
