= Monica Maimone =

Italian theatre director

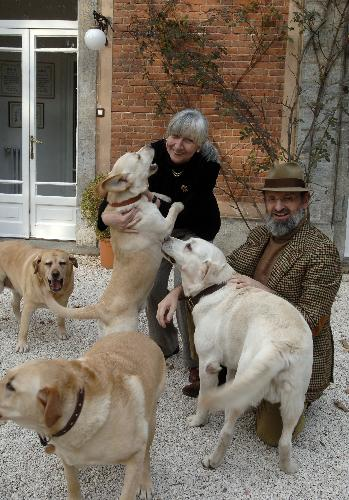
- Born: 5 December 1945; Vedano Olona (Varese), Italy
- Occupation(s): artistic director, theatre director, playwright
- Website: Studio Festi

Monica Maimone (born 5 December 1945), is an Italian theater director and playwright.

She started her career in theater in 1966; in 1968 she created the theatre group called Nuova Scena together with Dario Fo and Franca Rame, following the model of Erwin Piscator's "Volksbũhne". The most important production of Nuova Scena was Mistero Buffo by Dario Fo.

She directed and produced theatrical events at Salone Pier Lombardo, Milan (now Teatro Franco Parenti), with Franco Parenti and Andrée Ruth Shammah. In 1977, she became the director of the theater.

In 1982, Maimone created Studio Festi with Valerio Festi. Since then, she has been the director and the playwright of all Studio Festi performances.

Monica Maimone is President of the Ipazia-Arte Foundation for the environment, which encourages artists to focus on the environment. The foundation has produced Deluge, a show first presented in Laikipia, Kenya.
