= Igor Kozyr =

Belarusian wrestler

Personal information
- Nationality: Belarusian
- Born: 3 August 1966 (age 59) Gomel, Belarus

Sport
- Sport: Wrestling

Igor Kozyr (born 3 August 1966) is a Belarusian wrestler. He competed in the men's freestyle 74 kg at the 1996 Summer Olympics.
