= Gjoko Dineski =

Macedonian cross-country skier (born 1972)

Personal information
- Nationality: Macedonian
- Born: 18 September 1972 (age 54) Kruševo, SR Macedonia, SFR Yugoslavia

Sport
- Sport: Cross-country skiing

Gjoko Dineski (born 18 September 1972) is a North Macedonian cross-country skier. He competed at five World Championships between 1997 and 2007 as well as two Winter Olympics in 1998 and 2002, being a part of Macedonia's first Winter Olympic squad.

== Early life ==
Growing up on a small mountain farm with a donkey, he watched cross-country skiing on television and had posters of skiers on the walls.

== Career ==
At the FIS Nordic World Ski Championships 1997 in Trondheim, Dineski entered the 50 kilometre race. Ending a distant last in 68th place, he crossed the goal line over one hour slower than the winner Mika Myllylä, about forty minutes slower than the 66th-placing skier and about twenty minutes slower than the 67th-placing skier. The medal ceremony had commenced when silver medallist Erling Jevne noticed Dineski approaching the goal line. Viewing Dineski as a "moral winner", Jevne stepped down from the podium and handed Dineski a bouquet of flowers he had received. The skiers then brought Dineski up on the podium, where he was photographed alongside bronze medallist Bjørn Dæhlie. One newspaper commentator wrote about Dineski's hapless race which he nonetheless managed to complete: "That is the greatest sports performance anyone can do", thus Dineski was "one name which will never be forgotten from the WC in Trondheim '97".

After the World Championships, Dineski received minor financial support as well as a sponsorship from a Skopje pizzeria, entailing free food. Owning two pairs of rather worn skis, one pair of poles, and not seeing much snow in Macedonia, he spent time training on rollerskates. He kept in contact with Norway by socializing and playing hobby-level football with Norwegian UNPROFOR personnel.

As the 1997–98 skiing season approached, Norwegian individuals and companies wanted to give Dineski a fighting chance in the sport. He was invited to Valdres by the local tourism company Valdres Aktiviteter and Avisa Valdres. Here, he would train in real winter conditions, receive a subsidized stay at a hotel and thousands of dollars worth of sports equipment, as well as participate in the annual early-season race at Beitostølen. Meetups were staged involving Dineski, Jevne, Dæhlie and female skier Inger Helene Nybråten. He was assigned a local coach who also created a training regime for Dineski to follow later.

Dineski ended last in the Beitosprinten race, but felt tangible progress from the previous season. In December 1997, he trained in the Czech Republic. Ahead of the 1998 Winter Olympics, he enjoyed a ten-day training camp in Tisleidalen, Norway, again facilitated by his contacts in Valdres. The UNPROFOR also helped the Macedonian Olympic Committee afford a delegation to Japan. Dineski was subsequently selected as his country's first ever participant at the Winter Olympics, being the flag bearer at the 1998 Winter Olympics opening ceremony. He entered the 10 kilometre classical race. However, this time he ended second to last, as the last finisher Philip Boit of Kenya received attention similar to what was bestowed upon Dineski a year before.

At the 1999 World Championships Dineski collected 69th, 87th and 69th places in three races, followed by a 72nd place at the 2001 World Championships and a 73rd place at the 2003 World Championships. At the 2002 Winter Olympics he ended 68th (and last) in the 30 kilometre freestyle mass start and 63th in the sprint qualification round.

Dineski studied at a sports faculty, and desired to take up coaching at one point. He did reach that goal, representing Macedonia at the 2006 Winter Olympics as the coach of skier Darko Damjanovski. Also coaching Macedonian biathletes, Dineski was described as the only person in his country to make an income from skiing. Maintaining contact with Norway, the country sent pairs of skis from time to time, mostly in children's sizes.

Still, Dineski had a final outing as a competitor. At his last World Championships in 2007, he raced in the 15 kilometre freestyle and ended 112th. Losing to the aforementioned Philip Boit, Dineski beat only one competitor, Brazilian Helio Freitas.
