= Gjorgi Markovski =

Macedonian alpine skier (born 1986)

Personal information
- Born: 8 January 1986 (age 40) Bitola, North Macedonia

Skiing career
- Sport: Alpine skiing ♂
- Club: Pelister Ski Club
- Disciplines: Slalom; Giant Slalom; Super G

Olympics
- Teams: 1 (2006)
- Updated on 18 March 2026

Gjorgi Markovski (Macedonian: Ѓорги Марковски, born 8 January 1986) is a Macedonian alpine skier who competed for Macedonia at the 2006 Winter Olympics. He was selected as his nation's flag bearer for both the opening ceremony and the closing ceremony.
