= Nenad Trpovski =

Macedonian slalom canoer (born 1978)

Personal information
- Native name: Ненад Трповски
- Birth name: Nenad Trpovski
- Born: 15 September 1978 (age 46)

Sport
- Sport: Canoeing

Nenad Trpovski (Macedonian: Ненад Трповски; born 15 September 1978) is a Macedonian slalom canoer. Trpovski would compete at the 1996 Summer Olympics in Atlanta representing Macedonia in one men's canoeing event. He would represent the nation for their first appearance at an Olympic Games.

He would compete in the men's slalom C-1 event. He would place 28th in his first run but would not finish the race in his record run. He would rank last out of the 30 competitors that participated in the event and thus did not medal.

== Biography ==
Nenad Trpovski was born on 15 September 1978. Trpovski would compete at the 1996 Summer Olympics in Atlanta, United States, representing Macedonia (now North Macedonia) in one men's canoeing event. He would be one of the first Macedonian canoeing competitors and one of the first Macedonian sportspeople overall to compete at an Olympic Games, as the nation would make its official debut at the Olympic Games at this edition of the competition.

Trpovski would compete in the men's slalom C-1 event against 29 other competitors on 27 July 1996. For his first round, he would record a time of 3:11.19 though earned a penalty time of 125 seconds, earning 316.19 points. He would place 28th in the round. For the second round, he would not finish the round and did not record a time, and was thus unranked in the placements of the round. Overall, he would place last in the event, placing behind Danko Herceg of Croatia. The champion of the event was Michal Martikán of Slovakia who won with a time of 151.03 seconds.
