= Valerij Verhušin =

Macedonian wrestler

Personal information
- Nationality: Macedonian
- Born: 10 March 1960
- Died: 6 January 2017 (aged 56)

Sport
- Sport: Wrestling

Valerij Verhušin (10 March 1960 – 6 January 2017) was a Russian naturalized Macedonian wrestler. He competed in the men's freestyle 74 kg at the 1996 Summer Olympics.
