= Ana Ugrinovska =

Macedonian slalom canoer (born 1980)

Ana Ugrinovska (born May 18, 1980) is a Macedonian slalom canoer who competed from the mid-1990s to the early 2000s. She finished 29th in the K-1 event at the 1996 Summer Olympics in Atlanta.
