= Rosana Kiroska =

Macedonian cross-country skier (born 1991)

Rosana Kiroska (Macedonian: Росана Кироска; born 22 January 1991) is a Macedonian cross-country skier who has competed since 2004. She finished 77th in the 10 km event at the 2010 Winter Olympics in Vancouver.

At the FIS Nordic World Ski Championships 2009 in Liberec, Kiroska finished 83rd in the individual sprint event.

She has three career victories in lesser events up to 5 km from 2007.
