= Jung Soon-won =

South Korean wrestler (born 1973)

Jung Soon-Won (born 12 October 1973) is a Korean former wrestler who competed in the 1996 Summer Olympics.
