= Darko Naseski =

Macedonian sports shooter

Personal information
- Nationality: Macedonian
- Born: 16 November 1979 (age 45)

Sport
- Sport: Sports shooting

Darko Naseski (born 16 November 1979) is a Macedonian sports shooter. He competed in the men's 10 metre air rifle event at the 1996 Summer Olympics.
