= Stavre Jada =

Macedonian cross-country skier (born 1998)

Stavre Jada (born 18 May 1998) is a Macedonian cross-country skier and biathlete. Jada was the flag bearer for Macedonia during the 2018 Winter Olympics Parade of Nations.

== Biathlon results ==
All results are sourced from the International Biathlon Union.

=== World Championships ===
0 medals

Event	Individual	Sprint	Pursuit	Mass start	Relay	Mixed relay	Single Mixed relay
(Sweden) 2019 Östersund	DNF	97th	—	—	—	—	—
(Italy) 2020 Rasen-Antholz	94th	96th	—	—	—	—	—
(Slovenia) 2021 Pokljuka	DNF	103rd	—	—	—	—	—

*During Olympic seasons competitions are only held for those events not included in the Olympic program.
**The single mixed relay was added as an event in 2019.

Olympic Games
Preceded by Darko Damjanovski	Flagbearer for North Macedonia; Pyeongchang 2018	Succeeded by Incumbent
