= Dejan Panovski =

Macedonian alpine skier (born 1980)

Personal information
- Nationality: Macedonian
- Born: 30 April 1980 (age 46) Skopje, SR Macedonia, SFR Yugoslavia

Sport
- Sport: Alpine skiing

Dejan Panovski (Macedonian: Дејан Пановски; born 30 April 1980) is a Macedonian Alpine skier. He competed in two events at the 2002 Winter Olympics.
