= Valerio Festi =

Italian artistic director and producer

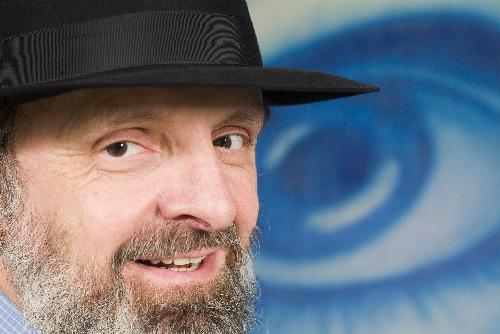
- Born: 1953; Bologna, Italy
- Occupation(s): Chief Executive Officer, artistic director, producer
- Website: Studio Festi

Valerio Festi is an Italian artistic director and producer. He is also the Chief Executive Officer at Studio Festi.

== Biography ==
Valerio obtained his degree in 1978 at the University of Bologna.

He began his artistic career by designing and staging urban celebrations.

In the early 1980s, he gained fame by revamping the Italian tradition of light installations and of Baroque fireworks. In 1982, he established Studio Festi with Monica Maimone.

He has been the artistic director of a considerable number of open-air events and installations.
