= Boris Budaev =

Soviet and Uzbekistani wrestler of Buriad-Mongolian ancestry from Ikires tribe

Personal information
- Nationality: USSR, Uzbekistan
- Born: 19 July 1957 (age 69) Soyol, Buryad-Mongolian ASSR, USSR

Sport
- Sport: Wrestling
Medal record
Men's freestyle wrestling
Representing Uzbekistan
Asian Championships
Gold medal – first place	1996 Xiaoshan	68 kg
Representing Soviet Union
World Championships
Gold medal – first place	1989 Martigny	68 kg
European Championships
Gold medal – first place	1982 Varna	68 kg
World Junior Championships
Gold medal – first place	1979 Ulaanbaatar	68 kg
Summer Universiade
Bronze medal – third place	1981 Bucharest	Lightweight

Boris Dugdanovich Budaev (born 19 July 1957) is Soviet and Uzbekistani wrestler of Buryad-Mongolian ancestry from Ikires tribe. He competed in the men's freestyle 74 kg at the 1996 Summer Olympics.

== Highlight achievements ==
Career accomplishments include:

- 1979 World Junior Champion.
- 1982 European Champion.
- 1985 USSR Champion.
- 1989 World Champion.
- 1990 Grand Masters of Olympic Wrestling Champion.
- 1996 Asian Champion
- Member of the 1996 Uzbekistani Olympic Team.

Boris Budaev achieved first major international success at the 1979 World Junior Championships, where he won the gold medal. In the final matches, he lost to Roger Frizzel of USA by points, but the Mongolian Buyandelgeriin Bold, who had previously lost to Boris, won against the U.S. wrestler by fall, after which Boris received the winner title thanks to the overall standings. Due to this victory, he was included in the USSR national team.

According to information provided by a public group "Ekhirit/Ikires" on the social network "Vkontakte", Boris Budaev is a member of Tokhoy Bayandai clan from a historical Mongolic Ikires tribe.
