= Filiberto Fernández =

Mexican wrestler (born 1972)

Filiberto Fernández (born 21 April 1972) is a Mexican former wrestler who competed in the 1996 Summer Olympics.
