= Javier Zapata =

Colombian cyclist

Personal information
- Born: January 15, 1973 (age 53) Medellín, Antioquia, Colombia

Cycling career
- Sport: Cycling
- Discipline: Bike trials
- Role: Rider

Javier Zapata Cuartas (born January 15, 1973, in Medellín, Antioquia) is a Colombian biketrial rider who performs the sport of biketrial, a sport that is little known internationally but very popular in Colombia. Zapata is arguably the sport's most visible performer.

== Biography ==
He began his sport career at age nine. Back then he was a BMX rider and he won numerous national and international championships. In 1995 he began his career as a biketrial rider. Zapata was the first person to get a biketrial bike in Colombia, which was specially manufactured for him by the GT manufacturing company there. Having been an expert BMX racer, Zapata, who placed 5th at the BMX world championships once and ran at BMX tournaments for eight years, quickly became used to the new type of bike he was riding, and decided to dedicate himself to promote his new sport in Colombia.

Zapata then toured all over Colombia, performing at multiple shows and earning money for each of his presentations. His stunts impressed many; he would use some of the first money he gained to travel to Spain, where he came in fifth place at biketrial's first world championship. Later on, he went to Barcelona, where he entered the Guinness Book of Records by using his bike to climb the stairs of the tallest building of that city all the way to the top, without ever using his feet. Zapata later on travelled to Japan, where he once again climbed the stairs of some buildings with his bike, without using his feet.

In 2001, he returned to Barcelona, once again to participate at the world championships.

He is the only Colombian athlete that has achieved four Guinness World Records. His latest Guinness World Record was achieved in Mexico City in 2003. He climbed up in his bike the 1318 stairs of Torre Mayor, the tallest building in Latin America. His other Guinness World Records were obtained in Caracas (Venezuela), Bogota and Medellin (Colombia). In 2006 he obtained a new National Record jumping on his bike over the largest number of persons (23 persons).

He also performed a stunt show during half-time of a Copa Libertadores football game between Colombia and Ecuador in 2003.

Javier Zapata lives in Medellín where he runs his own biketrial school and his own brand ZAPATABIKES which produces bikes and accessories. He rides a Monty 221 Ti Full disc 2007 Hope Monotrial, Zapatabikes MTB.
