= Takuya Ōta =

Japanese wrestler (born 1970)

Medal record

Men's freestyle wrestling

Representing Japan

Olympic Games
Bronze medal – third place	1996 Atlanta	74 kg

Takuya Ōta (太田 拓弥, Ōta Takuya; born 2 January 1970) is a Japanese former wrestler who competed in the 1996 Summer Olympics.
