= Lazar Popovski =

Macedonian kayaker (born 1974)

Lazar Popovski (Macedonian: Лазар Поповски; born 19 May 1974 in Skopje, SR Macedonia, SFR Yugoslavia) is a Macedonian whitewater kayaker, and a four-time Olympian.

He competed at the 2004 Summer Olympics in Athens. In the K-1 event he finished sixth in the qualification round, progressing to the semifinals. In the semifinals he finished sixteenth, failing to reach the top ten and the final round.

Popovski previously competed at the 2000 Summer Olympics, 1996 Summer Olympics and also at the 1992 Summer Olympics as an Independent Olympic Participant, and was the National flag bearer at the Sydney Olympics.

Popovski began kayaking on the river Treska, where his father, a former slalom and downriver National Champion, taught him about kayaking.

Popovski studied economics in Skopje, and before receiving an MBA degree from the University of Louisville. He was later the first Chairman of the Athletes Commission of the Macedonian Olympic Committee, and became a director of the Agency of Youth and Sports, the highest governmental body for sports in North Macedonia. During this time, the National sport academy was established and the National sports award was incorporated.

Popovski later became Chief Human Resources Officer in Makedonski Telekom, a member of Deutsche Telekom Group.

He also manages Kayak Adventures, a subsidiary of the family owned company which does outdoor activities.
