= José Restrepo (wrestler) =

Colombian wrestler (born 1974)

Personal information
- Nationality: Colombian
- Born: 25 August 1974 (age 51)

Sport
- Sport: Wrestling

José Restrepo (born 25 August 1974) is a Colombian wrestler. He competed in the men's freestyle 48 kg at the 1996 Summer Olympics.
