= Vladimir Torgovkin =

Kyrgyzstani wrestler (born 1965)

Vladimir Torgovkin (born 26 June 1965) is a Kyrgyzstani former wrestler who competed in the 1996 Summer Olympics.
