= Armen Mkrtchyan =

Armenian wrestler

Personal information
- Born: 6 October 1973 (age 52) Vedi, Armenian SSR, Soviet Union
- Height: 153 cm (5 ft 0 in)
- Weight: 52 kg (115 lb)

Sport
- Sport: Wrestling
- Event: Freestyle
- Club: Ararat Veti
- Coached by: Grant Yenokyan
Medal record
Men's freestyle wrestling
Representing Armenia
Olympic Games
Silver medal – second place	1996 Atlanta	48 kg
World Championships
Bronze medal – third place	1995 Atlanta	48 kg
European Championships
Gold medal – first place	1994 Rome	48 kg
Silver medal – second place	1996 Budapest	48 kg
Bronze medal – third place	2001 Budapest	54 kg

Armen Mkrtchyan (Armenian: Արմեն Մկրտչյան; born 6 October 1973) is an Armenian freestyle wrestler. He is an Olympic silver medalist, World Championships medalist, and European Champion. In addition, he was also awarded the Master of Sport of the USSR, International Class title in 1991 and the Honored Master of Sports of Armenia title in 1996.

== Biography ==
Mkrtchyan began his wrestling career under the guidance of Razmik Karapetyan and, in 1992 and for the rest of his career, under Yuri Babayan and Grant Yenokyan. Armen was a member of the USSR national wrestling team as a junior. In 1990, he won the Junior World Wrestling Championship gold medal at the age of 18.

After the collapse of the USSR in 1991, he represented Armenia at international competitions. He won the 1992 Espoir European Championships and 1993 Espoir World Championships. In 1994, Armen won a gold medal at the European Wrestling Championships in Rome. He became the first European Wrestling Champion of the independent Republic of Armenia in freestyle wrestling. Mkrtchyan won a bronze medal at the 1995 World Wrestling Championships in Atlanta, the first medal won by a freestyle wrestler of Armenia. Because Mkrtchyan had ranked in the top six wrestlers of his division, he received automatic qualification to return to Atlanta in a year's time to compete at the 1996 Summer Olympics.

At the 1996 Olympic Games in Atlanta, Mkrtchyan reached the finals, where he faced off against the division reigning Olympic Champion Kim Il of North Korea. Mkrtchyan and Kim both put up a bitter struggle in a back and forth match. In the end, Mkrtchyan lost by one point, 4–5. This had been the closest to defeat Kim had come to in five years. Mkrtchyan became the first ever Olympic silver medalist from Armenia.

In 1997, Mkrtchyan moved up to a heavier weight class, moving from paperweight (48 kg) to flyweight (54 kg). He was unable to qualify for the 2000 Summer Olympics. After winning a bronze medal at the 2001 European Wrestling Championships, Mkrtchyan retired.
