= Felipe Guzmán (wrestler) =

Mexican wrestler (born 1967)

Felipe Guzmán (born 17 October 1967) is a Mexican former wrestler who competed in the 1996 Summer Olympics.
