= Vlatko Sokolov =

Macedonian wrestler

Personal information
- Nationality: Macedonian
- Born: 5 November 1973 (age 52)

Sport
- Sport: Wrestling

Vlatko Sokolov (born 5 November 1973) is a Macedonian wrestler. He competed in the men's freestyle 48 kg at the 1996 Summer Olympics.
