= Dardan Dehari =

Macedonian alpine skier (born 1990)

Personal information
- Born: 23 August 1990 (age 36) Tetovo, SR Macedonia, SFR Yugoslavia (present-day North Macedonia)
- Height: 191 cm (6 ft 3 in)

Skiing career
- Sport: Alpine skiing
- Club: Shkendija

Dardan Dehari (born 23 August 1990) is a Macedonian alpine ski racer of Albanian descent.

He competed at the 2015 World Championships in Beaver Creek, USA, in the giant slalom.
