= Antonio Ristevski =

Macedonian alpine skier (born 1989)

Antonio Ristevski (Macedonian: Антонио Ристевски; born 19 May 1989) is an alpine skier who competed for Macedonia at the 2010 Winter Olympics. He was selected as his nation's flag bearer at the opening ceremony.
