= Gheorghe Corduneanu =

Romanian wrestler

Gheorghe Corduneanu (born 11 June 1976) is a Romanian former wrestler who competed in the 1996 Summer Olympics.
