= Jana Nikolovska =

Macedonian skier (born 1979)

Personal information
- Nationality: Macedonian
- Born: 12 September 1979 (age 45); Skopje, Yugoslavia

Sport
- Sport: Alpine skiing

Jana Nikolovska (born 12 September 1979) is a Macedonian alpine skier. She competed in the women's giant slalom at the 1998 Winter Olympics.
