= Darko Damjanovski =

Macedonian biathlete and cross-country skier (born 1981)

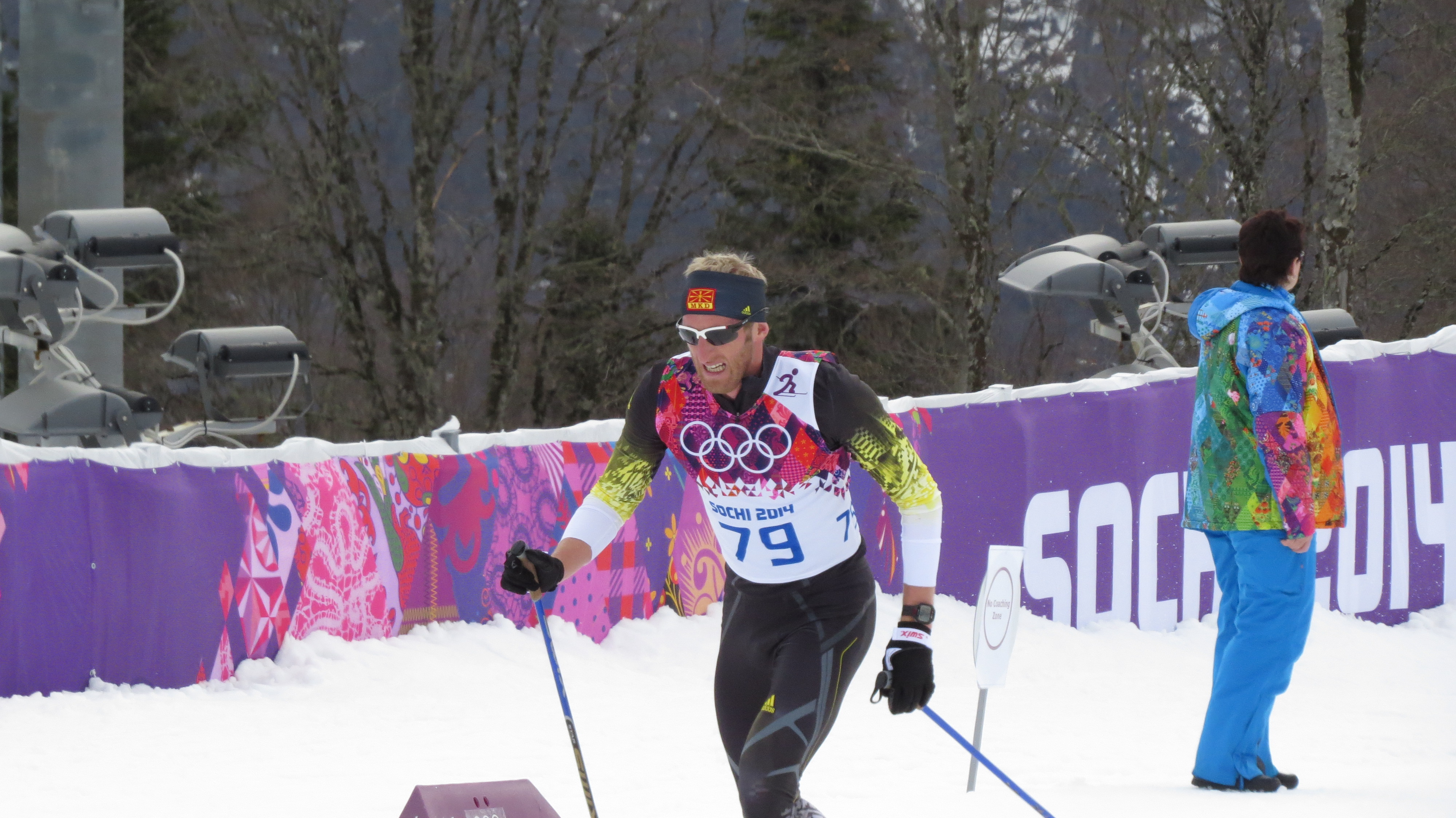
Darko Damjanovski in 2014

Darko Damjanovski (Macedonian: Дарко Дамјановски, born 15 July 1981) is a Macedonian biathlete and cross-country skier who has competed since 1999 and 2005, respectively. Competing in three Winter Olympics (2006, 2010 and 2014), he earned his best finish of 81st in the 15 km event in Sochi at the 2014 Winter Olympics.

Damjanovski's best finish at the FIS Nordic World Ski Championships was 96th in the 15 km event at Sapporo in 2007. Damjanovski has five victories in lesser events up 10 km since 2007.

Damjanovski lives in Gostivar.
