= Olympic Committee of North Macedonia =

National Olympic Committee

- Country: North Macedonia
- Code: MKD
- Created: 1992
- Recognized: 1993
- Continental Association: EOC
- Headquarters: Skopje, North Macedonia
- President: Daniel Dimevski
- Secretary General: Sasho Popovski
- Website: www.mok.org.mk

The Olympic Committee of North Macedonia (Macedonian: Олимписки комитет на Северна Македонија, romanized: Olimpiski komitet na Severna Makedonija; IOC Code: MKD) is the National Olympic Committee of North Macedonia. Members of the committee are 26 sports federations, which elect the Executive Council composed of the president and four members. It is based in the country's capital, Skopje.

== History ==
The Olympic Committee of North Macedonia was founded as the Olympic Committee of the Former Yugoslav Republic of Macedonia in 1992 and recognized by the International Olympic Committee in 1993 reflecting the disputed status of its country's official name. In March 2019, the IOC approved its name change to the Olympic Committee of North Macedonia.

== List of presidents ==
President	Term
Vasil Tupurkovski	1992–2020
Daniel Dimevski	2020–present

== Assignments and aims ==
The Committee aims to develop the sport activity and sport education in North Macedonia. It also works to spread the Olympism and to interest the young people in the value of the sport and the Olympic Games. The main assignments and aims of the Committee are:

- The preparation and participation of athletes from North Macedonia in the Summer and Winter Olympic Games.
- The development and spreading of the Olympic Movement in North Macedonia.
- To spread the ground principles of the Olympism throughout the country using activities and programs which integrate with the educative and cultural life of the people.
- The development of the most popular sports at the highest levels.
- The development of international cooperation in the realm of sports.
- To carry out activities which combat discrimination and racism.

== Executive committee ==
- President: Daniel Dimevski
- Vice Presidents: Primislav Dimovski, Pero Antić
- Secretary General: Sasho Popovski
- Sport director: Vladimir Bogoevski

== Member federations ==
The National Federations are the organizations that coordinate all aspects of their individual sports. They are responsible for training, competition and development of their sports. There are currently 23 Olympic Summer and three Winter Sport Federations in North Macedonia.

National Federation	Summer or Winter	Headquarters
Athletic Federation of North Macedonia	Summer	Skopje
Macedonian Badminton Federation	Summer	Skopje
Basketball Federation of North Macedonia	Summer	Skopje
Macedonian Boxing Federation	Summer	Skopje
Macedonian Canoe Federation	Summer	Skopje
Cycling Federation of Macedonia	Summer	Skopje
Macedonian Equestrian Federation	Summer	Skopje
Macedonian Fencing Federation	Summer	Skopje
Football Federation of Macedonia	Summer	Skopje
Macedonian Gymnastics Federation	Summer	Bitola
Macedonian Handball Federation	Summer	Skopje
Macedonian Ice Hockey Federation	Winter	Skopje
Judo Federation of Macedonia	Summer	Skopje
Karate Federation of Macedonia	Summer	Skopje
Macedonian Sailing Federation	Summer	Ohrid
Skating Federation of Macedonia	Winter	Skopje
Ski Federation of Macedonia	Winter	Skopje
Macedonian Sport Climbing Federation	Summer	Skopje
Macedonian Sport Shooting Federation	Summer	Skopje
Macedonian Swimming Federation	Summer	Skopje
Macedonian Table Tennis Federation	Summer	Skopje
Macedonian Taekwondo Federation	Summer	Skopje
Macedonian Tennis Federation	Summer	Skopje
Macedonian Triathlon Federation	Summer	Skopje
Macedonian Volleyball Federation	Summer	Skopje
Wrestling Federation of Macedonia	Summer	Skopje

== See also ==
- North Macedonia at the Olympics
