= Australia at the 2000 Summer Olympics =

- IOC code: AUS
- NOC: Australian Olympic Committee
- Website: www.olympics.com.au

in Sydney
- Competitors: 617 (341 men, 276 women) in 34 sports
- Flag bearers: Andrew Gaze (opening); Ian Thorpe (closing)
- Medals Ranked 4th: Gold 16 Silver 25 Bronze 17 Total 58

Summer Olympics appearances (overview)
- 1896; 1900; 1904; 1908; 1912; 1920; 1924; 1928; 1932; 1936; 1948; 1952; 1956; 1960; 1964; 1968; 1972; 1976; 1980; 1984; 1988; 1992; 1996; 2000; 2004; 2008; 2012; 2016; 2020; 2024; 2028

Other related appearances
- 1906 Intercalated Games –––– Australasia (1908–1912)

Australia was the host nation for the 2000 Summer Olympics in Sydney. Australian athletes have competed in every Summer Olympic Games. 617 competitors, 341 men and 276 women, took part in 270 events in 34 sports.

== Medalists ==
Medal	Name	Sport	Event	Date
Gold	Simon Fairweather	Archery	Men's individual	September 20
Gold	Cathy Freeman	Athletics	Women's 400 m	September 25
Gold	Brett Aitken, Scott McGrory	Cycling	Men's Madison	September 21
Gold	Phillip Dutton, Andrew Hoy, Matthew Ryan, Stuart Tinney	Equestrian	Eventing Team	September 19
Gold	Australia women's national field hockey team: Kate Allen; Alyson Annan; Renita Farrell; Juliet Haslam; Rechelle Hawkes; Nikki Hudson; Rachel Imison; Clover Maitland; Claire Mitchell-Taverner; Jenn Morris; Alison Peek; Katrina Powell; Lisa Powell; Angie Skirving; Kate Starre; Julie Towers	Field hockey	Women's competition	September 29
Gold	Michael Diamond	Shooting	Men's trap	September 17
Gold	Tom King, Mark Turnbull	Sailing	Men's 470	September 28
Gold	Jenny Armstrong, Belinda Stowell	Sailing	Women's 470	September 28
Gold	Ian Thorpe	Swimming	Men's 400 m freestyle	September 16
Gold	Grant Hackett	Swimming	Men's 1500 m freestyle	September 23
Gold	Grant Hackett, Bill Kirby, Michael Klim, Daniel Kowalski, Todd Pearson, Ian Thorpe	Swimming	Men's 4 × 200 m freestyle relay	September 19
Gold	Adam Pine, Todd Pearson, Michael Klim, Ashley Callus, Chris Fydler, Ian Thorpe	Swimming	Men's 4 × 100 m freestyle relay	September 16
Gold	Susie O'Neill	Swimming	Women's 200 m freestyle	September 19
Gold	Lauren Burns	Taekwondo	Women's 49 kg	September 27
Gold	Natalie Cook, Kerri Pottharst	Volleyball	Women's beach volleyball	September 26
Gold	Australia women's national water polo team: Naomi Castle; Joanne Fox; Bridgette Gusterson; Simone Hankin; Yvette Higgins; Kate Hooper; Bronwyn Mayer; Gail Miller; Melissa Mills; Debbie Watson; Liz Weekes; Danielle Woodhouse; Taryn Woods	Water polo	Women's competition	September 23
Silver	Jai Taurima	Athletics	Men's long jump	September 28
Silver	Tatiana Grigorieva	Athletics	Women's pole vault	September 29
Silver	Australia women's national basketball team: Carla Boyd; Michelle Brogan; Sandy Brondello; Trisha Fallon; Kristi Harrower; Jo Hill; Lauren Jackson; Annie La Fleur; Shelley Sandie; Rachael Sporn; Michele Timms; Jenny Whittle	Basketball	Women's competition	September 30
Silver	Daniel Collins, Andrew Trim	Canoeing	Men's K-2 500 m	October 1
Silver	Gary Neiwand	Cycling	Men's keirin	September 21
Silver	Michelle Ferris	Cycling	Women's track time trial	September 16
Silver	Andrew Hoy	Equestrian	Eventing Individual	September 22
Silver	Ji Wallace	Gymnastics	Men's trampoline	September 23
Silver	Daniel Burke, Jaime Fernandez, Alastair Gordon, Brett Hayman, Rob Jahrling, Mike McKay, Nick Porzig, Christian Ryan, Stuart Welch	Rowing	Men's eight	September 24
Silver	Darren Balmforth, Simon Burgess, Anthony Edwards, Robert Richards	Rowing	Men's lightweight coxless four	September 24
Silver	Kate Slatter, Rachael Taylor	Rowing	Women's coxless pair	September 23
Silver	Darren Bundock, John Forbes	Sailing	Tornado	September 24
Silver	Russell Mark	Shooting	Men's double trap	September 20
Silver	Ian Thorpe	Swimming	Men's 200 m freestyle	September 18
Silver	Kieren Perkins	Swimming	Men's 1500 m freestyle	September 23
Silver	Matt Welsh	Swimming	Men's 100 m backstroke	September 18
Silver	Michael Klim	Swimming	Men's 100 m butterfly	September 21
Silver	Regan Harrison, Geoff Huegill, Michael Klim, Ryan Mitchell, Adam Pine, Ian Thorpe, Josh Watson, Matt Welsh	Swimming	Men's 4 × 100 m medley relay	September 23
Silver	Leisel Jones	Swimming	Women's 100 m breaststroke	September 18
Silver	Susie O'Neill	Swimming	Women's 200 m butterfly	September 20
Silver	Elka Graham, Susie O'Neill, Giaan Rooney, Petria Thomas, Kirsten Thomson, Jacinta van Lint	Swimming	Women's 4 × 200 m freestyle relay	September 20
Silver	Dyana Calub, Leisel Jones, Susie O'Neill, Giaan Rooney, Sarah Ryan, Petria Thomas, Tarnee White	Swimming	Women's 4 × 100 m medley relay	September 22
Silver	Daniel Trenton	Taekwondo	Men's +80 kg	September 30
Silver	Todd Woodbridge, Mark Woodforde	Tennis	Men's doubles	September 27
Silver	Michellie Jones	Triathlon	Women's competition	September 16
Bronze	Katrin Borchert	Canoeing	Women's K-1 500 m	October 1
Bronze	Shane Kelly	Cycling	Men's track time trial	September 16
Bronze	Bradley McGee	Cycling	Men's individual pursuit	September 17
Bronze	Sean Eadie, Darryn Hill, Gary Neiwand	Cycling	Men's team sprint	September 17
Bronze	Robert Newbery, Dean Pullar	Diving	Men's synchronized 3 m springboard	September 28
Bronze	Rebecca Gilmore, Loudy Tourky	Diving	Women's synchronized 10 m platform	September 28
Bronze	Australia men's national field hockey team: Michael Brennan; Adam Commens; Stephen John Davies; Damon Diletti; Lachlan Dreher; Jason Duff; Troy Elder; James Elmer; Paul Gaudoin; Stephen Holt; Brent Livermore; Daniel Sproule; Jay Stacy; Craig Victory; Matthew Wells; Michael York	Field hockey	Men's competition	September 30
Bronze	Maria Pekli	Judo	Women's 57 kg	September 18
Bronze	Ben Dodwell, Bo Hanson, Geoff Stewart, James Stewart	Rowing	Men's coxless four	September 23
Bronze	Matthew Long, James Tomkins	Rowing	Men's coxless pair	September 23
Bronze	Michael Blackburn	Sailing	Laser	September 29
Bronze	Annemarie Forder	Shooting	Women's 10 m air pistol	September 17
Bronze	Australia women's national softball team: Sandra Allen; Joanne Brown; Fiona Crawford; Kerry Dienelt; Peta Edebone; Sue Fairhurst; Selina Follas; Kelly Hardie; Tanya Harding; Sally McDermid; Simmone Morrow; Melanie Roche; Natalie Titcume; Natalie Ward; Brooke Wilkins	Softball (Women-only event)		September 25
Bronze	Matt Welsh	Swimming	Men's 200 m backstroke	September 21
Bronze	Geoff Huegill	Swimming	Men's 100 m butterfly	September 21
Bronze	Justin Norris	Swimming	Men's 200 m butterfly	September 19
Bronze	Petria Thomas	Swimming	Women's 200 m butterfly	September 20

== Archery ==
Australia won its first Olympic gold medal, and moreover the first Olympic medal of any color, in the sport of archery in Sydney. Simon Fairweather defeated all six archers he faced, including a comfortable seven-point victory in the final.

Men

Athlete	Event	Ranking round		Round of 64	Round of 32	Round of 16	Quarterfinals	Semifinals	Final / BM	
Athlete	Event	Score	Seed	Opposition Score	Opposition Score	Opposition Score	Opposition Score	Opposition Score	Opposition Score	Rank
Simon Fairweather	Individual	642	8	Stevens (CUB) (57); W 170–161	de Grandis (FRA); W 161–150	Arias (CUB); W 167–163	Tsyrempilov (RUS); W 113–104	van Alten (NED); W 112–110	Wunderle (USA); W 113–106	1st place, gold medalist(s)
Matthew Gray	Individual	631	27	Tang (CHN) (38); L 161–163	Did not advance					
Scott Hunter-Russell	Individual	603	51	Akbal (TUR) (14); W 154–146	Frangilli (ITA); L 154–164	Did not advance				
Simon Fairweather; Matthew Gray; Scott Hunter-Russell	Team	1876	10	—N/a		Sweden; L 238–241	Did not advance			

Women

Athlete	Event	Ranking round		Round of 64	Round of 32	Round of 16	Quarterfinals	Semifinals	Final / BM	
Athlete	Event	Score	Seed	Opposition Score	Opposition Score	Opposition Score	Opposition Score	Opposition Score	Opposition Score	Rank
Kate Fairweather	Individual	630	27	Phutkaradze (GEO) (38); W 166–158	Kawauchi (JPN); L 158–160	Did not advance				
Melissa Jennison	Individual	628	32	Lorig (GEO) (33); W 160–151	Kim S-n (KOR); L 159–164	did not advance				
Michelle Tremelling	Individual	615	49	Dykman (USA) (16); W 154–146	Lewis (RSA); W 162–147	Kim S-n (KOR); L 158–168	Did not advance			
Kate Fairweather; Melissa Jennison; Michelle Tremelling	Team	1873	10	—N/a		Italy; L 236–237	Did not advance			

== Athletics ==
Key

- Note–Ranks given for track events are within the athlete's heat only
- Q = Qualified for the next round
- q = Qualified for the next round as a fastest loser or, in field events, by position without achieving the qualifying target
- NR = National record
- N/A = Round not applicable for the event
- Bye = Athlete not required to compete in round

Men
Track and road events

Athlete	Event	Heat		Quarterfinal		Semifinal		Final	
Athlete	Event	Result	Rank	Result	Rank	Result	Rank	Result	Rank
Paul di Bella	100 m	10.52	5	Did not advance					
Patrick Johnson	100 m	10.31	2 Q	10.44	5	Did not advance			
Matt Shirvington	100 m	10.35	2 Q	10.13	2 Q	10.26	5	Did not advance	
Patrick Johnson	200 m	20.88	5 q	20.87	7	Did not advance			
Matt Shirvington	200 m	20.91	4 q	DNS		Did not advance			
Darryl Wohlsen	200 m	20.98	5	Did not advance					
Daniel Batman	400 m	DNF		Did not advance					
Patrick Dwyer	400 m	45.82	2 Q	45.38	4 Q	45.70	7	Did not advance	
Casey Vincent	400 m	45.49	3 Q	45.45	4 Q	45.61	6	Did not advance	
Grant Cremer	800 m	1:45.86	3 q	—N/a		1:52.57	8	Did not advance	
Kris McCarthy	800 m	1:48.92	4	—N/a		Did not advance			
Nick Howarth	1500 m	3:45.46	11	—N/a		Did not advance			
Mizan Mehari	5000 m	13:24.56	8 q	—N/a				13:42.03	12
Craig Mottram	5000 m	13:31.06	8	—N/a				Did not advance	
Michael Power	5000 m	13:51.00	13	—N/a				Did not advance	
Sisay Bezabeh	10,000 m	28:21.63	11	—N/a				Did not advance	
Shaun Creighton	10,000 m	28:52.71	14	—N/a				Did not advance	
Kyle Vander-Kuyp	110 m hurdles	13.67	3 Q	13.62	4 Q	13.63	8	Did not advance	
Matthew Beckenham	400 m hurdles	51.27	7	—N/a		Did not advance			
Rohan Robinson	400 m hurdles	50.80	4	—N/a		Did not advance			
Blair Young	400 m hurdles	49.75	4 q	—N/a		49.20	4	Did not advance	
Chris Unthank	3,000 m steeplechase	9:11.19	12	—N/a				Did not advance	
Paul di Bella; Patrick Johnson; Matt Shirvington; Darryl Wohlsen	4 × 100 m relay	38.76	2 Q	—N/a		DQ		Did not advance	
Patrick Dwyer; Michael Hazel; Casey Vincent; Blair Young	4 × 400 m relay	3:04.13	3 q	—N/a		3:01.91	3 Q	3:03.91	7
Nicholas A'Hern	20 km walk	—N/a						1:21:34	10
Nathan Deakes	20 km walk	—N/a						1:21:03	8
Dion Russell	20 km walk	—N/a						1:25:26	25
Duane Cousins	50 km walk	—N/a						4:10:43	34
Nathan Deakes	50 km walk	—N/a						3:47:29	6
Dion Russell	50 km walk	—N/a						4:02:50	27
Rod de Highden	Marathon	—N/a						2:18:04	28
Steve Moneghetti	Marathon	—N/a						2:14:50	8
Lee Troop	Marathon	—N/a						2:29:32	66

Field events

Athlete	Event	Qualification		Final	
Athlete	Event	Distance	Position	Distance	Position
Peter Burge	Long jump	8.06	5 q	8.11	6
Jai Taurima	Long jump	8.09	4 q	8.49	2nd place, silver medalist(s)
Andrew Murphy	Triple jump	17.12	=2 Q	16.80	10
Tim Forsyth	High jump	2.24	=14	Did not advance	
Paul Burgess	Pole vault	5.55	=16	Did not advance	
Viktor Chistiakov	Pole vault	5.70	4 q	5.80	=5
Dmitriy Markov	Pole vault	5.70	3 q	5.80	=5
Justin Anlezark	Shot put	18.59	29	Did not advance	
Andrew Currey	Javelin	78.12	22	Did not advance	
Adrian Hatcher	Javelin	79.23	21	Did not advance	
Andrew Martin	Javelin	81.31	16	Did not advance	
Stuart Rendell	Hammer throw	72.78	28	Did not advance	

Combined events – Decathlon

Athlete	Event	100 m	LJ	SP	HJ	400 m	110H	DT	PV	JT	1500 m	Final	Rank
Scott Ferrier	Result	11.11	7.19	13.50	1.97	DNS	—	—	—	—	—	—	DNF
Scott Ferrier	Points	836	859	698	776	0	—	—	—	—	—	—	DNF

Women
Track and road events

ABC footage and interviews of crowds celebrating Cathy Freeman's 400m win.

Athlete	Event	Heat		Quarterfinal		Semifinal		Final	
Athlete	Event	Result	Rank	Result	Rank	Result	Rank	Result	Rank
Melinda Gainsford-Taylor	100 m	11.34	3 Q	11.24	4 Q	11.45	8	Did not advance	
Lauren Hewitt	100 m	11.42	4 q	11.54	6	Did not advance			
Cathy Freeman	200 m	23.11	3 Q	22.75	3 Q	22.71	4 Q	22.53	6
Melinda Gainsford-Taylor	200 m	22.71	1 Q	22.49	1 Q	22.61	3 Q	22.42	5
Lauren Hewitt	200 m	23.07	1 Q	23.12	3 Q	23.44	7	Did not advance	
Cathy Freeman	400 m	51.63	1 Q	50.31	1 Q	50.01	1 Q	49.11	1st place, gold medalist(s)
Lee Naylor	400 m	53.10	5 q	53.83	8	Did not advance			
Nova Peris-Kneebone	400 m	52.51	3 Q	51.28	3 Q	52.49	8	Did not advance	
Susan Andrews	800 m	2:03.31	5	—N/a		Did not advance			
Tamsyn Lewis	800 m	2:00.33	2 Q	—N/a		1:59.33	4	Did not advance	
Georgie Clarke	1500 m	4:11.74	8 q	—N/a		4:10.99	10	Did not advance	
Margaret Crowley	1500 m	4:08.85	7 q	—N/a		4:09.16	8	Did not advance	
Sarah Jamieson	1500 m	4:12.90	11	—N/a		Did not advance			
Kate Anderson-Richardson	5000 m	15:45.34	9	—N/a				Did not advance	
Anne Cross	5000 m	16:07.18	14	—N/a				Did not advance	
Benita Willis	5000 m	15:21.37	6	—N/a				Did not advance	
Clair Fearnley	10,000 m	33:47.23	15	—N/a				Did not advance	
Natalie Harvey	10,000 m	34:12.90	17	—N/a				Did not advance	
Kylie Risk	10,000 m	34:30.91	17	—N/a				Did not advance	
Deborah Edwards	100 m hurdles	13.24	5	Did not advance					
Jana Pittman	400 m hurdles	56.76	3	—N/a		Did not advance			
Lauren Poetschka	400 m hurdles	58.06	6	—N/a		Did not advance			
Stephanie Price	400 m hurdles	58.81	6	—N/a		Did not advance			
Sharon Cripps; Lauren Hewitt; Elly Hutton; Melinda Gainsford-Taylor	4 × 100 m relay	DNF		—N/a		Did not advance			
Susan Andrews*; Melinda Gainsford-Taylor; Cathy Freeman; Tamsyn Lewis; Jana Pittman; Nova Peris-Kneebone	4 × 400 m relay	3:24.05	2 Q	—N/a				3:23.81	5
Jane Saville	20 km walk	—N/a						DSQ	
Kerry Saxby-Junna	20 km walk	—N/a						1:32.02	7
Lisa Sheridan-Paolini	20 km walk	—N/a						1:40.57	39
Nickey Carroll	Marathon	—N/a						DNF	
Susan Hobson	Marathon	—N/a						2:38.44	35
Kerryn McCann	Marathon	—N/a						2:28.37	11

Field events

Athlete	Event	Qualification		Final	
Athlete	Event	Distance	Position	Distance	Position
Bronwyn Thompson	Long jump	6.55	16	Did not advance	
Alison Inverarity	High jump	1.80	32	Did not advance	
Emma George	Pole vault	4.25	15	Did not advance	
Tatiana Grigorieva	Pole vault	4.30	1 Q	4.55	2nd place, silver medalist(s)
Daniela Costian	Discus throw	51.96	31	Did not advance	
Alison Lever	Discus throw	59.58	16	Did not advance	
Lisa-Marie Vizaniari	Discus throw	62.47	6 q	62.57	8
Louise Currey	Javelin throw	53.32	31	Did not advance	
Joanna Stone	Javelin throw	58.34	17	Did not advance	
Karyne Perkins	Hammer throw	59.49	21	Did not advance	
Deborah Sosimenko	Hammer throw	64.01	7 q	67.95	5

Combined events – Heptathlon

Athlete	Event	100H	HJ	SP	200 m	LJ	JT	800 m	Final	Rank
Jane Jamieson	Result	14.09	1.81	13.59	25.27	6.09	45.32	2:16.57	6104	10
Jane Jamieson	Points	966	991	767	862	877	770	871	6104	10

== Badminton ==
Men

Athlete	Event	Round of 64	Round of 32	Round of 16	Quarterfinals	Semifinals	Final / BM	
Athlete	Event	Opposition Score	Opposition Score	Opposition Score	Opposition Score	Opposition Score	Opposition Score	Rank
Rio Suryana	Singles	Bye	Stoyanov (BUL); L 8–15, 15–2, 13–15	Did not advance				
David Bamford; Peter Blackburn	Doubles	—N/a	Łogosz / Mateusiak (POL); L 5–15, 17–16, 6–15	Did not advance				

Women

Athlete	Event	Round of 64	Round of 32	Round of 16	Quarterfinals	Semifinals	Final / BM	
Athlete	Event	Opposition Score	Opposition Score	Opposition Score	Opposition Score	Opposition Score	Opposition Score	Rank
Rhonda Cator	Singles	Bye	Grether (GER); L 3–11, 3–11	Did not advance				
Rayoni Head	Singles	Hermitage (CAN); W 11–7, 11–2	Chan (TPE); L 1–11, 1–11	Did not advance				
Kellie Lucas	Singles	Boteva (BUL); L 5–11, 6–11	Did not advance					
Rhonda Cator; Amanda Hardy	Doubles	—N/a	Cloutier; Hermitage (CAN); L 13–15, 6–15	Did not advance				
Rayoni Head; Kellie Lucas	Doubles	—N/a	Ekmongkolpaisarn; Thungthongkam (THA); L 7–15, 4–15	Did not advance				

Mixed

Athlete	Event	Round of 32	Round of 16	Quarterfinals	Semifinals	Final / BM	
Athlete	Event	Opposition Score	Opposition Score	Opposition Score	Opposition Score	Opposition Score	Rank
David Bamford; Amanda Hardy	Doubles	Bruil van den Heuvel (NED); L 10–15, 3–15	Did not advance				
Peter Blackburn; Rhonda Cator	Doubles	Sudhisodhi; Thungthongkam (THA); L 4–15, 12–15	Did not advance				
Rio Suryana; Kellie Lucas	Doubles	Chen; Chen (CHN); L 0–15, 3–15	Did not advance				

== Baseball ==
=== Men's tournament ===
The Australians' second appearance in the Olympic baseball tournament resulted in the team moving up one place in the rankings, from seventh to sixth. They defeated Korea and South Africa but lost to the five other teams in competition to finish outside the top four and find themselves eliminated after the preliminaries.

Team roster

- Craig Anderson
- Grant Balfour
- Tom Becker
- Shayne Bennett
- Mathew Buckley
- Adam Burton
- Clayton Byrne
- Mark Ettles
- Paul Gonzalez
- Mark Hutton
- Ronny Johnson
- Grant McDonald
- Adrian Meagher
- Michael Moyle
- Michael Nakamura
- David Nilsson
- Glenn Reeves
- Brett Roneberg
- Chris Snelling
- Brad Thomas
- Rodney van Buizen
- David White
- Gary White
- Glenn Williams
- Head coach: Jon Deeble

Team	Event	Group stage								Semifinal	Final / BM	
Team	Event	Opposition Score	Opposition Score	Opposition Score	Opposition Score	Opposition Score	Opposition Score	Opposition Score	Rank	Opposition Score	Opposition Score	Rank
Australia men's	Men's	Netherlands; L 4-6	South Korea; W 5-3	Japan; L 3-7	South Africa; W 10-4	Cuba; L 0-1	Italy; L 7-8 (F/12)	United States; L 1-12 (F/7)	7	Did not advance		

== Basketball ==
Men's team roster

- Andrew Gaze (captain)
- Chris Anstey
- Mark Bradtke
- Martin Cattalini
- Ricky Grace
- Shane Heal
- Luc Longley
- Sam Mackinnon
- Brett Maher
- Paul Rogers
- Jason Smith
- Andrew Vlahov
- Head coach: Barry Barnes

Women's team roster

- Sandy Brondello
- Michelle Brogan
- Carla Boyd
- Jo Hill
- Kristi Harrower
- Shelly Sandie
- Annie la Fleur
- Trisha Fallon
- Lauren Jackson
- Rachael Sporn
- Michele Timms
- Jenny Whittle
- Head coach: Tom Maher

Teams' results

Team	Event	Group stage						Quarterfinal	Semifinal	Final / BM	
Team	Event	Opposition Score	Opposition Score	Opposition Score	Opposition Score	Opposition Score	Rank	Opposition Score	Opposition Score	Opposition Score	Rank
Australia men's	Men's tournament	Canada; L 90-101	FR Yugoslavia; L 66-80	Russia; W 75-71	Angola; W 86-75	Spain; W 91-80	3 Q	Italy; W 65-62	France; L 52-76	Lithuania; L 71-89	4
Australia women's	Women's tournament	Canada; W 78-46	Brazil; W 81-70	Slovakia; W 70-47	Senegal; W 96-39	France; W 69-62	1 Q	Poland; W 76-48	Brazil; W 64-52	United States; L 54-76	2nd place, silver medalist(s)

== Beach volleyball ==
Men

Athlete	Event	Preliminary round	Preliminary elimination		Round of 16	Quarterfinals	Semifinals	Final	
Athlete	Event	Opposition Score	First round Opposition Score	Second round Opposition Score	Opposition Score	Opposition Score	Opposition Score	Opposition Score	Rank
Matthew Grinlaubs; Josh Slack	Men's	Loiolo – Rego (BRA); L 3-15	Baracetti – Salema (ARG); W 15-2	Berger – Stamm (AUT); L 10-15	Did not advance				=17
Julien Prosser; Lee Zahner	Men's	Rodriguez Ibarra – Villalobos (MEX); L 12-15	Kvalheim – Maaseide (NOR); W 15-12	Heidger – Wong (USA); W 15-11	P Laciga – M Laciga (SUI); L 8-15	Did not advance			=9
Natalie Cook; Kerri Pottharst	Women's	Galindo – Gaxiola (MEX); W 15-11	Bye		Rong – Xiong (CHN); W 15-2	Bruschini – Solazzi (ITA); W 15-11	Pires – Samuel (BRA); W 15-6	Bede – Behar (BRA); W 2-0	1st place, gold medalist(s)
Tania Gooley; Pauline Manser	Women's	Gattelli – Perrotta (ITA); W 15-9	Bye		Prawerman – Rigaux (FRA); W 15-3	Bede – Behar (BRA); L 7-15	Did not advance		=5
Annette Huygens-Tholen; Sarah Straton	Women's	Davis – Johnson Jordan (USA); L 13-15	Friedrichsen – Müsch (GER); L 9-15	Did not advance					=19

== Boxing ==
Athlete	Event	Round of 32	Round of 16	Quarterfinals	Semifinals	Final	
Athlete	Event	Opposition Result	Opposition Result	Opposition Result	Opposition Result	Opposition Result	Rank
Erle Wiltshire	Flyweight	Thomas (FRA); L 1-13	Did not advance				
Justin Kane	Bantamweight	Bye	Wongprates (THA); W 15-13	Danylchenko (UKR); L RSC	Did not advance		
James Swan	Featherweight	Pereira (BRA); L 4-8	Did not advance				
Michael Katsidis	Lightweight	Nunes (BRA); W 15-6	Karimzhanov (KAZ); L 7-9	Did not advance			
Henry Collins	Light welterweight	Williams (USA); L RSC	Did not advance				
Daniel Geale	Welterweight	Bundu (ITA); L 2-4	Did not advance				
Richard Rowles	Light middleweight	Ubaldo (DOM); W 16-7	Ćatić (GER); L RSC	Did not advance			
Paul Miller	Middleweight	Ravelo (DOM); W 8-7	Alakparov (AZE); L 8-9	Did not advance			
Danny Green	Light heavyweight	Barros (BRA); W RSC	Lebziak (RUS); L RSC	Did not advance			

== Canoeing ==
=== Slalom ===
Athlete	Event	Preliminary						Final					
Athlete	Event	Run 1	Rank	Run 2	Rank	Total	Rank	Run 1	Rank	Run 2	Rank	Total	Rank
Robin Bell	Men's slalom C-1	134.76	8	133.98	4	268.75	5 Q	120.32	7	124.16	10	244.48	9
Andrew Farrance; Kai Swoboda	Men's slalom C-2	147.32	7	200.01	11	347.33	11	Did not advance					
John Wilkie	Men's slalom K-1	140.44	20	180.42	22	320.84	21	Did not advance					
Danielle Woodward	Women's slalom K-1	161.49	15	152.31	12	313.80	14 q	132.58	10	129.31	6	261.89	8

=== Sprint ===
Men

Athlete	Event	Heats		Semifinals		Final	
Athlete	Event	Time	Rank	Time	Rank	Time	Rank
Nathan Baggaley	Men's K-1 500 metres	1:41.854	9 Q	1:40.884	8	Did not advance	
Clint Robinson	Men's K-1 1000 metres	3:40.197	17 Q	3:40.745	11	Did not advance	
Daniel Collins; Andrew Trim	Men's K-2 500 metres	1:30.393	2 Q	1:31.475	4 Q	1:47.895	2nd place, silver medalist(s)
Brian Morton; Luke Young	Men's K-2 1000 metres	3:20.934	14 Q	3:25.046	8	Did not advance	
Ross Chaffer; Cameron McFadzean; Peter Scott; Shane Suska	Men's K-4 1000 metres	3:05.893	13 Q	3:05.527	7	Did not advance	

Women

Athlete	Event	Heats		Semifinals		Final	
Athlete	Event	Time	Rank	Time	Rank	Time	Rank
Katrin Borchert	Women's K-1 500 metres	1:52.187	5 Q	1:53.070	1 Q	2:15.138	3rd place, bronze medalist(s)
Katrin Borchert; Anna Wood	Women's K-2 500 metres	1:45.250	6 Q	1:44.682	1 Q	2:01.472	6
Natalie Hunter; Shelley Oates-Wilding; Kerri Randle; Amanda Simper	Women's K-4 500 metres	1:37.081	9 Q	1:38.580	4	Did not advance	

== Cycling ==
=== Cross country ===
Athlete	Event	Time	Rank
Cadel Evans	Men's cross-country	2:13:31	7
Paul Rowney	Men's cross-country	2:14:22	10
Rob Woods	Men's cross-country	2:14:42	13
Anna Baylis	Women's cross-country	2:00:53	21
Mary Grigson	Women's cross-country	1:53.22	6

=== Road cycling ===
Men

Athlete	Event	Time	Rank
Robbie McEwen	Road race	5:30:46	19
Scott McGrory	Road race	DNF	
Stuart O'Grady	Road race	5:36:14	77
Henk Vogels	Road race	5:30:46	30
Matt White	Road race	DNF	
Nathan O'Neill	Time trial	1:00:32	19

Women

Athlete	Event	Time	Rank
Juanita Feldhahn	Road race	3:06:37	28
Tracey Gaudry	Road race	3:06:31	23
Anna Wilson	Road race	3:06:31	4
Tracey Gaudry	Time trial	45:11	21
Anna Wilson	Time trial	42:58	4

=== Track cycling ===
Pursuit

Athlete	Event	Qualification		Semifinals		Final	
Athlete	Event	Time	Rank	Opponent Results	Rank	Opponent Results	Rank
Brad McGee	Men's individual pursuit	4:21.903	4 q	Bartko (GER); L 4:22.644	4 q	Hayles (GBR); W 4:19.250	3rd place, bronze medalist(s)
Luke Roberts	Men's individual pursuit	4:31.162	9	Did not advance			
Alayna Burns	Women's individual pursuit	3:38.223	7	Did not advance			
Brett Aitken; Graeme Brown; Brett Lancaster; Michael Rogers	Men's team pursuit	4:06.361	5 Q	Germany; L 4:03.209	5	Did not advance	

Sprint

Athlete	Event	Qualification		Round 1	Repechage 1	Round 2	Repechage 2	Quarterfinals	Semifinals	Final	
Athlete	Event	Time Speed (km/h)	Rank	Opposition Time Speed (km/h)	Opposition Time Speed (km/h)	Opposition Time Speed (km/h)	Opposition Time Speed (km/h)	Opposition Time Speed (km/h)	Opposition Time Speed (km/h)	Opposition Time Speed (km/h)	Rank
Sean Eadie	Men's sprint	10.520s 68.441 km/h	8	van Eijden (GER); REL	Angelidis (GRE); W 11.805; 60.991 km/h	Nothstein (USA); L	Buráň (CZE); Hill (AUS); W 11.414; 63.080 km/h	Gane (FRA); L	—N/a	5-8th classification match van Eijden (GER); Villanueva (ESP); MacLean (GBR); L	7
Darryn Hill	Men's sprint	10.526s 68.402 km/h	9	Lepka (SVK); W 10.938; 65.826 km/h	—N/a	Fiedler (GER); L	Buráň (CZE); Eadie (AUS); L	—N/a		9-12th classification match Arrue (USA); Bērziņš (LAT); Buran (CZE); DNS	12
Michelle Ferris	Women's sprint	11.512s 62.543 km/h	4	Wang (CHN); W 12.078; 59.693 km/h	—N/a			Larreal (VEN); W 11.705	Ballanger (FRA); L	Yanovych (UKR); L	4

Time trial

Athlete	Event	Time	Rank
Shane Kelly	Men's time trial	1:02.818	3rd place, bronze medalist(s)
Michelle Ferris	Women's time trial	34.692	2nd place, silver medalist(s)
Lyndelle Higginson	Women's time trial	35.859	14

Points race

Athlete	Event	Points	Laps	Rank
Stuart O'Grady	Men's points race	26	0	10
Alayna Burns	Women's points race	7	0	9
Brett Aitken; Scott McGrory	Madison	26	0	1st place, gold medalist(s)

Keirin

Athlete	Event	1st round	Repechage	2nd round	Final
Athlete	Event	Rank	Rank	Rank	Rank
Gary Neiwand	Keirin	2 Q	Bye	2 Q	2nd place, silver medalist(s)

== Diving ==
Australia entered divers in all of the events, and won two bronze medals.

Men

Athlete	Event	Preliminaries		Semifinals		Final	
Athlete	Event	Points	Rank	Points	Rank	Points	Rank
Robert Newbery	3 m springboard	402.03	9 Q	594.90	15	Did not advance	
Dean Pullar	3 m springboard	406.65	8 Q	629.43	8 Q	647.40	5
Mathew Helm	10 m platform	455.37	5 Q	653.40	4 Q	618.24	8
Robert Newbery	10 m platform	437.40	9 Q	619.98	9 Q	613.98	10
Robert Newbery; Dean Pullar	3 m synchronized springboard	—N/a				322.86	3rd place, bronze medalist(s)
Mathew Helm; Robert Newbery	10 m synchronized platform	—N/a				333.24	5

Women

Athlete	Event	Preliminaries		Semifinals		Final	
Athlete	Event	Points	Rank	Points	Rank	Points	Rank
Rebecca Gilmore	3 m springboard	259.74	=18 Q	475.29	17	Did not advance	
Chantelle Michell	3 m springboard	270.75	13 Q	499.59	12 Q	550.68	7
Rebecca Gilmore	10 m platform	288.99	12 Q	464.91	10 Q	448.95	11
Loudy Tourky	10 m platform	257.40	24	Did not advance			
Chantelle Michell; Loudy Tourky	3 m synchronized springboard	—N/a				283.05	4
Rebecca Gilmore; Loudy Tourky	10 m synchronized platform	—N/a				301.50	3rd place, bronze medalist(s)

== Equestrian ==
Event	Competitor	Score		Position
Individual dressage	Kristy Oatley-Nist and Wall Street	210.79		9th
Individual dressage	Rachael Downs and Aphrodite	64.52		33rd
Individual dressage	Mary Hanna and Limbo	64.32		34th
Individual dressage	Ricky MacMillan and Crisp	64.08		Tied 35th
Team dressage	Kristy Oatley-Nist and Wall Street	1704	4925	6th
Team dressage	Rachael Downs and Aphrodite	1613	4925	6th
Team dressage	Ricky MacMillan and Crisp	1602	4925	6th
Team dressage	Mary Hanna and Limbo	1608	4925	6th
Individual eventing	Andrew Hoy and Swizzle In	39.8		Silver
Individual eventing	Brook Staples and Master Monarch	96.4		16th
Individual eventing	Amanda Ross and Otto Schumaker	142.0		20th
Team eventing	Andrew Hoy and Darien Powers	30.6	146.80	Gold
Team eventing	Stuart Tinney and Jeepster	36.0	146.80	Gold
Team eventing	Phillip Dutton and House Doctor	46.0	146.80	Gold
Team eventing	Matt Ryan and Kibah Sandstone	47.8	146.80	Gold
Individual jumping	Geoff Bloomfield and Money Talks	36.5 (Q), 20 (FR)		20th (tied)
Individual jumping	Jamie Coman and Zazu	16.25 (Q), 22 (FR)		43rd
Individual jumping	Ron Easey and Rolling Thunder	44.75 (Q)		52nd
Individual jumping	Gavin Chester and Another Flood	53 (Q)		60th
Team jumping	Jamie Coman and Zazu	4.00	20.00	8th
Team jumping	Ron Easey and Rolling Thunder	16.00	20.00	8th
Team jumping	Geoff Bloomfield and Money Talks	8.00	20.00	8th
Team jumping	Gavin Chester and Another Flood	8.00	20.00	8th

== Fencing ==
Seven fencers, five men and two women, represented Australia in 2000.

Men

Athlete	Event	Round of 64	Round of 32	Round of 16	Quarterfinal	Semifinal	Final / BM	
Athlete	Event	Opposition Score	Opposition Score	Opposition Score	Opposition Score	Opposition Score	Opposition Score	Rank
Gerry Adams	Men's épée	Pedroso (CUB); W 15-13	Kovács (HUN); W 15-14	Obry (FRA); L 5-15	Did not advance			
Nick Heffernan	Men's épée	Rivas (COL); L 10-15	Did not advance					
David Nathan	Men's épée	Shong (CAN); L 8-15	Did not advance					
Gerald McMahon	Men's foil	Wang H (CHN); L 6-15	Did not advance					
Gerry Adams; Luc Cartillier; Nick Heffernan	Men's team épée	—N/a		China; W 45-38	Italy; L 34-45	Did not advance		

Women

Athlete	Event	Round of 64	Round of 32	Round of 16	Quarterfinal	Semifinal	Final / BM	
Athlete	Event	Opposition Score	Opposition Score	Opposition Score	Opposition Score	Opposition Score	Opposition Score	Rank
Evelyn Halls	Women's épée	Bye	Rentmeister (AUT); L 14-15	Did not advance				
Jo Halls	Women's foil	Smith (GBR); L 7-15	Did not advance					

== Football ==
=== Men's tournament ===
Coach: Raul Blanco

No.	Pos.	Player	Date of birth (age)	Caps	Goals	2000 club
1	GK	Danny Milosevic	26 June 1978 (aged 22)	12	0	(The Football Association) Leeds United
2	DF	Simon Colosimo	8 January 1979 (aged 21)	9	0	(Football Australia) Carlton S.C.
3	MF	Stan Lazaridis*	16 August 1972 (aged 28)	0	0	(The Football Association) Birmingham City
4	DF	Hayden Foxe	23 June 1977 (aged 23)	10	5	(The Football Association) West Ham United
5	MF	Josip Skoko*	10 December 1975 (aged 24)	0	0	(Royal Belgian Football Association) Genk
6	DF	Stephen Laybutt	3 September 1977 (aged 23)	13	0	(Royal Dutch Football Association) Feyenoord
7	MF	Brett Emerton	22 February 1979 (aged 21)	23	7	(Royal Dutch Football Association) Feyenoord
8	DF	Lucas Neill	9 March 1978 (aged 22)	10	0	(The Football Association) Millwall
9	FW	Mark Viduka*	9 October 1975 (aged 24)	15	16	(The Football Association) Leeds United
10	MF	Kasey Wehrman	16 August 1977 (aged 23)	17	1	(Football Australia) Perth Glory
11	FW	Clayton Zane	12 July 1977 (aged 23)	13	9	(Norwegian Football Federation) Molde
12	DF	Con Blatsis	6 July 1977 (aged 23)	12	0	(The Football Association) Derby County
13	MF	Vince Grella	5 October 1979 (aged 20)	13	0	(Italian Football Federation) Ternana
14	MF	Nick Rizzo	9 June 1979 (aged 21)	10	2	(Italian Football Federation) Ternana
15	MF	Mark Bresciano	11 February 1980 (aged 20)	13	1	(Italian Football Federation) Empoli
16	MF	Jason Culina	5 August 1980 (aged 20)	17	1	(Royal Dutch Football Association) Ajax
17	FW	Michael Curcija	27 June 1977 (aged 23)	23	11	(Football Association of Serbia and Montenegro) Partizan
18	GK	Michael Turnbull	14 October 1981 (aged 18)	0	0	(Football Australia) Marconi Stallions

- *Over-aged player

Group stage

Team	Pld	W	D	L	GF	GA	GD	Pts
Italy	3	2	1	0	5	2	+3	7
Nigeria	3	1	2	0	7	6	+1	5
Honduras	3	1	1	1	6	7	−1	4
Australia	3	0	0	3	3	6	−3	0

13 September 2000
20:00

Australia	0–1	Italy
	Report	Pirlo 81'

Melbourne Cricket Ground, Melbourne
Attendance: 93,252
Referee: Peter Prendergast (Jamaica)

16 September 2000
20:00

Australia	2–3	Nigeria
Foxe 41'; Wehrman 44'	Report	Ikedia 16'; Aghahowa 22'; Agali 64'

Sydney Football Stadium, Sydney
Attendance: 38,080
Referee: Carlos Simon (Brazil)

19 September 2000
20:00

Australia	1–2	Honduras
Rosales 51' (o.g.)	Report	Suazo 3', 60'

Sydney Football Stadium, Sydney
Attendance: 37,788
Referee: Mourad Daami (Tunisia)

=== Women's tournament ===
Team roster

- Dianne Alagich
- Sharon Black
- Bryony Duus
- Alicia Ferguson
- Alison Forman (captain)
- Heather Garriock
- Kelly Golebiowski
- Peita-Claire Hepperlin
- Sunni Hughes
- Kate McShea
- Julie Murray
- Cheryl Salisbury
- Bridgette Starr
- Anissa Tann
- Leanne Trimboli
- Sacha Wainwright
- Tracey Wheeler
- Amy Wilson
- Head coach: Chris Tanzey

Group stage

Team	Pld	W	D	L	GF	GA	GD	Pts
Germany	3	3	0	0	6	1	+5	9
Brazil	3	2	0	1	5	3	+2	6
Sweden	3	0	1	2	1	4	−3	1
Australia	3	0	1	2	2	6	−4	1

13 September 2000
17:00

Australia	0–3	Germany
	Report	Grings 39'; Wiegmann 70'; Lingor 90'

Bruce Stadium, Canberra
Attendance: 24,800
Referee: Bola Abidoye (Nigeria)

16 September 2000
17:00

Australia	1–1	Sweden
Salisbury 57'	Report	Andersson 66' (pen.)

Sydney Football Stadium, Sydney
Attendance: 33,600
Referee: Sonia Denoncourt (Canada)

19 September 2000
17:30

Australia	1–2	Brazil
Hughes 33'	Report	Raquel 56'; Kátia 64'

Sydney Football Stadium, Sydney
Attendance: 29,400
Referee: Vibeke Karlsen (Norway)

== Gymnastics ==
=== Men's artistic ===
Athlete	Event	Qualification								Final							
Athlete	Event	Apparatus						Total	Rank	Apparatus						Total	Rank
Athlete	Event	F	PH	R	V	PB	HB	Total	Rank	F	PH	R	V	PB	HB	Total	Rank
Damian Istria	All-around	9.012	8.175	9.462	9.275	8.937	9.112	53.973	47	Did not advance							
Philippe Rizzo	All-around	9.312	9.225	8.837	9.037	9.237	8.475	54.123	44	Did not advance							

=== Women's artistic ===
Team

Athlete	Event	Qualification						Final					
Athlete	Event	Apparatus				Total	Rank	Apparatus				Total	Rank
Athlete	Event	V	UB	BB	F	Total	Rank	V	UB	BB	F	Total	Rank
Melinda Cleland	Team	9.393	9.637	—N/a		19.030	82	Did not advance					
Alexandra Croak	Team	—N/a	9.725	9.562	9.250	28.087	70	Did not advance					
Trudy McIntosh	Team	9.506	—N/a	9.612	9.612	28.730	66	Did not advance					
Lisa Skinner	Team	9.156	9.687	9.162	9.725 Q	37.730	18 Q	Did not advance					
Allana Slater	Team	8.268	9.675	9.387	9.625	36.955	39 Q	Did not advance					
Brooke Walker	Team	8.368	9.562	9.175	9.375	36.480	44	Did not advance					
Total	Team	36.423	38.561	37.736	38.37	151.057	7	Did not advance					

Individual events

Athlete	Event	Apparatus				Total	Rank
Athlete	Event	V	UB	BB	F	Total	Rank
Lisa Skinner	All-around	9.168	9.650	9.625	9.750	38.193	8
Lisa Skinner	Floor	—N/a			9.012	9.012	7
Allana Slater	All-around	9.025	9.712	9.112	9.662	37.511	16

== Handball ==
Men's team roster

- Peter Bach
- Christian Bajan
- Vernon Cheung
- Russell Garnett
- David Gonzalez
- Kristian Groenintwoud
- Darryl McCormack
- Rajan Pavlovic
- Taip Ramadani
- Brendon Taylor
- Lee Schofield
- Dragan Sestic
- Sasa Sestic
- Milan Slavujevic
- Karim Shehab
- Head coach: Zoltán Marczinka

Women's team roster

- Janni Bach
- Petra Besta
- Rina Bjarnason
- Raelene Boulton
- Kim Briggs
- Mari Edland
- Sarah Hammond
- Fiona Hannan
- Vera Ignjatovic
- Jana Jamnicky
- Lydia Kahmke
- Marina Kopcalic
- Jovana Milosevic
- Shelley Ormes
- Katrina Shinfield
- Head coach: Christoph Mecker

Teams' results

Team	Event	Group stage						Quarterfinal	Semifinal	Final / BM	
Team	Event	Opposition Score	Opposition Score	Opposition Score	Opposition Score	Opposition Score	Rank	Opposition Score	Opposition Score	Opposition Score	Rank
Australia men's	Men's tournament	Sweden; L 23-44	Spain; L 23-39	Slovenia; L 20-33	Tunisia; L 24-34	France; L 16-28	6	—N/a		11th place match Cuba; L 24-26	12
Australia women's	Women's tournament	Brazil; L 19-32	Norway; L 18-28	Denmark; L 12-38	Austria; L 10-36	—N/a	5	—N/a		11th place match Angola; L 18-26	12

== Field hockey ==
Men's team roster

- Michael Brennan
- Adam Commens
- Stephen Davies
- Damon Diletti (gk)
- Lachlan Dreher (gk)
- Jason Duff
- Troy Elder
- James Elmer
- Paul Gaudoin
- Stephen Holt
- Brent Livermore
- Daniel Sproule
- Jay Stacy
- Craig Victory
- Matthew Wells
- Michael York
- Head Coach: Terry Walsh

Women's team roster

- Kate Allen
- Alyson Annan
- Renita Farrell
- Juliet Haslam
- Rechelle Hawkes
- Nikki Hudson
- Rachel Imison (gk)
- Clover Maitland (gk)
- Claire Mitchell-Taverner
- Jenn Morris
- Alison Peek
- Katrina Powell
- Lisa Powell
- Angie Skirving
- Kate Starre
- Julie Towers
- Head Coach: Ric Charlesworth

Results

Team	Event	Group stage						Semifinal	Final / BM	
Team	Event	Opposition Score	Opposition Score	Opposition Score	Opposition Score	Opposition Score	Rank	Opposition Score	Opposition Score	Rank
Australia men's	Men's tournament	Poland; W 4-0	India; D 2-2	Spain; D 2-2	Argentina; W 2-1	South Korea; W 2-1	1 Q	Netherlands; D 0-0 (4-5 pen.)	Pakistan; W 6-3	3rd place, bronze medalist(s)
Australia women's	Women's tournament	Great Britain; W 2-1	Spain; D 1-1	Argentina; W 3-1	South Korea; W 3-0	—N/a	1 Q	Netherlands; W 5-0	Argentina; W 3-1	1st place, gold medalist(s)

== Judo ==
Men

Athlete	Event	Round of 32	Round of 16	Quarterfinals	Semifinals	Repechage 1	Repechage 2	Repechage 3	Final / BM	
Athlete	Event	Opposition Result	Opposition Result	Opposition Result	Opposition Result	Opposition Result	Opposition Result	Opposition Result	Opposition Result	Rank
Adrian Robertson	60kg	Ayed (TUN); L 0010-1110	Did not advance							
Andrew Collett	66kg	Wanga (ARU); W 1001-0000	Zhang G (CHN); L 0000-1000	Did not advance						
Thomas Hill	73kg	Velasco (PER); L 0010-1020	Did not advance							
Daniel Kelly	81kg	Morris (USA); W 0001-0000	Delgado (POR); L 0001-1010	Did not advance						
Robert Ivers	90kg	Morgan (CAN); L 0000-0010	Did not advance							
Daniel Rusitovic	100kg	Khalki (TUN); L 0010-0022	Did not advance							
Robert Ball	+100kg	Tangriev (UZB); L 0000-1000	Did not advance							

Women

Athlete	Event	Round of 32	Round of 16	Quarterfinals	Semifinals	Repechage 1	Repechage 2	Repechage 3	Final / BM	
Athlete	Event	Opposition Result	Opposition Result	Opposition Result	Opposition Result	Opposition Result	Opposition Result	Opposition Result	Opposition Result	Rank
Jenny Hill	48kg	Bye	Simons (BEL); L	Did not advance						
Rebecca Sullivan	52kg	Bye	Tignola (FRA); W	Kye (PRK); L	—N/a		Gravenstijn (NED); L	Did not advance		
Maria Pekli	57kg	Hüseynova (AZE); W	Nguele (CMR); W	Andersson (SWE); W	I Fernández (ESP); L	—N/a			Cavazzuti (ITA); W	3rd place, bronze medalist(s)
Carly Dixon	63kg	Artamonova (KGZ); L	Did not advance							
Catherine Arlove	70kg	Bye	Bacher (USA); L	Did not advance						
Natalie Jenkinson	78kg	Bye	Silva (BRA); L	Did not advance						
Caroline Curren	+78kg	Bye	Beltran (CUB); W	Did not advance						

== Modern pentathlon ==
Athlete	Event	Shooting (4.5 m air pistol)			Fencing (épée one touch)			Swimming (200 m freestyle)			Riding (show jumping)			Running (3000 m)			Total points	Final rank
Athlete	Event	Results	Rank	MP points	Time	Rank	MP points	Time	Rank	MP points	Penalties	Rank	MP points	Time	Rank	MP Points	Total points	Final rank
Robert McGregor	Men's	178	12	1072	7	=22	640	2:18.11	24	1119	195	17	905	9:48.26	17	1048	4784	20
Kitty Chiller	Women's	172	16	1000	10	=18	760	2:25.84	10	1142	60	=2	1040	11:34.02	14	944	4886	14

Coaches: Anthony Klarica, John Olsen, John Gilman, Scott Arnold, Russel Johnston

== Rhythmic gymnastics ==
Athlete	Event	Qualification						Final					
Athlete	Event	Rope	Hoop	Ball	Ribbon	Total	Rank	Rope	Hoop	Ball	Ribbon	Total	Rank
Dani Le Ray	Individual	9.575	9.591	9.566	9.483	38.215	19	Did not advance					

== Rowing ==
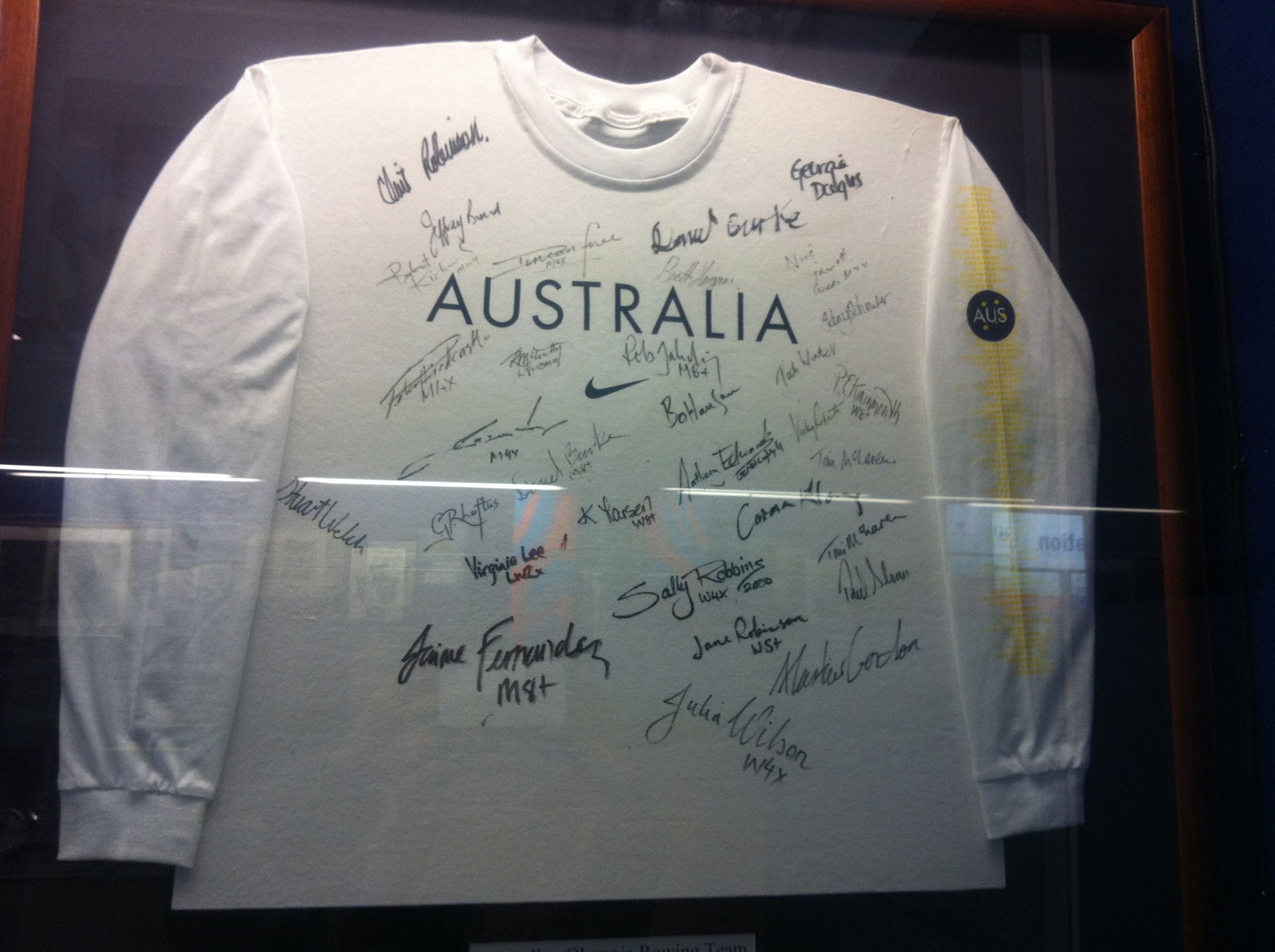
Signed T-shirt by the Australian 2000 Sydney Rowing Olympic team

Men

Athlete	Event	Heats		Repechage		Semifinals		Final	
Athlete	Event	Time	Rank	Time	Rank	Time	Rank	Time	Rank
Matthe Long; James Tomkins	coxless pair	6:46.99	2 SA/B	Bye		6:34.42	1 FA	6:34.26	3rd place, bronze medalist(s)
Haimish Karrasch; Bruce Hick	Lightweight double sculls	6:33.48	1 SA/B	Bye		6:25.20	4 FB	6:26.21	7
James Stewart; Ben Dodwell; Geoff Stewart; Bo Hanson	Coxless four	6:05.03	2 SA/B	Bye		6:02.03	1 FA	5:57.61	3rd place, bronze medalist(s)
Peter Hardcastle; Jason Day; Stuart Reside; Duncan Free	Quadruple sculls	5:52.09	1 SA/B	Bye		5:50.26	2 FA	5:50.32	4
Simon Burgess; Anthony Edwards; Darren Balmforth; Robert Richards	Lightweight coxless four	6:11.42	1 SA/B	Bye		6:00.82	1 FA	6:02.09	2nd place, silver medalist(s)
Christian Ryan; Alastair Gordon; Nick Porzig; Rob Jahrling; Mike McKay; Stuart Welch; Daniel Burke; Jaime Fernandez; Brett Hayman	Eight	5:32.85	1 FA	Bye		—N/a		5:33.88	2nd place, silver medalist(s)

Women

Athlete	Event	Heats		Repechage		Semifinals		Final	
Athlete	Event	Time	Rank	Time	Rank	Time	Rank	Time	Rank
Gina Douglas	Single sculls	7:43.48	2 R	7:42.67	1 SA/B	7:32.34	2 FA	7:37.88	5
Kate Slatter; Rachael Taylor	Coxless pair	7:20.69	2 R	7:19.79	1 FA	—N/a		7:12.56	2nd place, silver medalist(s)
Marina Hatzakis; Bronwyn Roye	Double sculls	7:18.40	4 R	7:10.09	2 FA	—N/a		7:05.35	6
Virginia Lee; Sally Newmarch	Lightweight double sculls	7:11.11	2 R	7:14.08	1 SA/B	7:06.58	3 FA	7:12.04	4
Monique Heinke; Kerry Knowler; Sally Robbins; Julia Wilson	Quadruple sculls	6:47.01	4 R	6:42.22	3 FB	—N/a		6:37.22	7
Alison Davies; Katie Foulkes; Rachael Kininmonth; Kristina Larsen; Martin; Roberts; Jane Robinson; Thompson; Jodi Winter	Eight	6:17.44	2 R	6:17.72	3 FA	—N/a		6:15.16	5

== Sailing ==
Australia competed in all of the sailing events at the 2000 Olympics. They won 2 golds, 1 silver and 1 bronze.

Men

Athlete	Event	Race											Net points	Final rank
Athlete	Event	1	2	3	4	5	6	7	8	9	10	11	Net points	Final rank
Lars Kleppich	Mistral	4	~~OCS~~	~~18~~	3	8	1	18	8	5	9	5	61	4
Anthony Nossiter	Finn	12	14	13	~~20~~	6	10	14	~~19~~	8	2	15	94	13
Tom King; Mark Turnbull	470	5	1	2	~~14~~	7	10	8	1	2	~~11~~	2	38	1st place, gold medalist(s)

Women

Athlete	Event	Race											Net points	Final rank
Athlete	Event	1	2	3	4	5	6	7	8	9	10	M*	Net points	Final rank
Jessica Crisp	Mistral	13	~~15~~	4	4	9	8	4	~~16~~	3	4	10	59	5
Melanie Dennison	Europe	18	17	7	~~OCS~~	~~19~~	10	19	8	3	4	16	102	15
Jenny Armstrong; Belinda Stowell	470	1	~~11~~	~~18~~	5	8	7	1	6	3	1	1	33	1st place, gold medalist(s)

Open

Athlete	Event	Race																Net points	Final rank
Athlete	Event	1	2	3	4	5	6	7	8	9	10	11	12	13	14	15	M*	Net points	Final rank
Michael Blackburn	Laser	8	9	2	~~18~~	6	5	~~22~~	2	12	3	14	—N/a					60	3rd place, bronze medalist(s)
Chris Nicholson; Daniel Phillips	49er	11	11	1	~~14~~	1	1	12	3	1	6	~~17~~	10	8	5	9	7	86	6
Darren Bundock; John Forbes	Tornado	1	3	4	4	4	~~7~~	2	4	~~5~~	2	1	—N/a					25	2nd place, silver medalist(s)
Colin Beashel; David Giles	Star	8	8	6	1	3	2	8	9	~~17~~	~~12~~	6	—N/a					51	7

Match racing

Athlete	Event	Qualification races						Total	Rank	Round Robin					Rank	Quarterfinals	Semifinals	Final / BM	Rank
Athlete	Event	1	2	3	4	5	6	Total	Rank	GER	DEN	SWE	RUS	USA	Rank	Quarterfinals	Semifinals	Final / BM	Rank
Neville Wittey; Josh Grace; David Edwards	Soling	8	11	6	1	9	~~14~~	35	6 Q	L	L	L	L	W	5	did not advance			8

== Shooting ==
=== Men ===
Athlete	Event	Qualification		Final	
Athlete	Event	Points	Rank	Total	Rank
Clive Barton	Skeet	121	14	Did not advance	
David Chapman	25m rapid fire pistol	557	20	Did not advance	
David Cunningham	Skeet	116	39	Did not advance	
Michael Diamond	Trap	122	1 Q	147	1st place, gold medalist(s)
Michael Diamond	Double trap	135	9	Did not advance	
Adam Gitsham	10m running target	556	17	Did not advance	
David Jones	10m running target	562	16	Did not advance	
Timothy Lowndes	10m air rifle	582	41	Did not advance	
Timothy Lowndes	50m rifle prone	593	19	Did not advance	
Timothy Lowndes	50m rifle three positions	1159	20	Did not advance	
Russell Mark	Trap	113	13	Did not advance	
Russell Mark	Double trap	143 OR	1 Q	187; SO: 2	2nd place, silver medalist(s)
David Moore	10m air pistol	567	32	Did not advance	
David Moore	50m pistol	556	18	Did not advance	
David Porter	10m air pistol	561	38	Did not advance	
David Porter	50m pistol	553	20	Did not advance	
Warren Potent	50m rifle prone	593	19	Did not advance	
Samuel Wieland	10m air rifle	587	27	Did not advance	
Samuel Wieland	50m rifle three positions	1158	22	Did not advance	

=== Women ===
Athlete	Event	Qualification		Final	
Athlete	Event	Points	Rank	Total	Rank
Deserie Baynes	Trap	61	12	Did not advance	
Deserie Baynes	Double trap	97	12	Did not advance	
Annemarie Forder	10m air pistol	385	5 Q	484	3rd place, bronze medalist(s)
Lindy Imgrund	10m air rifle	387	41	Did not advance	
Tash Lonsdale	Skeet	70	4 Q	93	4
Sue McCready	10m air rifle	392	15	Did not advance	
Sue McCready	50m rifle three positions	574	20	Did not advance	
Carrie Quigley	50m rifle three positions	551	39	Did not advance	
Ann Maree Roberts	Double trap	98	9	Did not advance	
Linda Ryan	10m air pistol	375	28	Did not advance	
Linda Ryan	25m pistol	579	11	Did not advance	
Lisa-Anne Smith	Trap	62	10	Did not advance	
Christine Trefry	25m pistol	578	15	Did not advance	

== Softball ==
- Team Roster
  - Sandra Allen
  - Joanne Brown
  - Kerry Dienelt
  - Peta Edebone
  - Sue Fairhurst
  - Selina Follas
  - Fiona Hanes
  - Kelly Hardie
  - Tanya Harding
  - Sally McCreedy
  - Simmone Morrow
  - Melanie Roche
  - Natalie Titcume
  - Natalie Ward
  - Brooke Wilkins
- Head coach: Bob Crudgington

Results

Team	Event	Group stage								Semifinal	Final	Grand Final	
Team	Event	Opposition Score	Opposition Score	Opposition Score	Opposition Score	Opposition Score	Opposition Score	Opposition Score	Rank	Opposition Score	Opposition Score	Opposition Score	Rank
Australia women's	Women's tournament	New Zealand; W 3-2	Italy; W 7-0	Canada; W 1-0	Japan; L 0-1	United States; W 2-1	China; W 1-0	Cuba; W 8-1	2 Q	—N/a	United States; L 0-1	—N/a	3rd place, bronze medalist(s)

== Swimming ==
Australia was very successful in the swimming venue at the 2000 Olympics. They won 5 Gold, 9 Silver, and 4 Bronze medals. The biggest rivalry, both in the press and in the pool, was between the United States and Australia relay teams. In the 4 × 100 m relay, the Americans had won the event every time it had been contested. Australia was able to edge out the Americans by .19 seconds to win the gold medal. The Australians also set three world records. The 2000 Olympics also saw the emergence of Ian Thorpe as an Olympic champion in the Men's 400 m Freestyle.

Men

Athlete	Events	Heat		Semifinal		Final	
Athlete	Events	Time	Rank	Time	Rank	Time	Rank
Cameron Delaney	200 m backstroke	1:59.61	3 Q	2:00.39	11	Did not advance	
Matthew Dunn	200 m individual medley	2:02.44	8 Q	2:01.95	9	Did not advance	
Matthew Dunn	400 m individual medley	4:20.31	12	—N/a		Did not advance	
Chris Fydler	50 m freestyle	22.80	16 Q	22.41	=10	Did not advance	
Chris Fydler	100 m freestyle	49.45	=6 Q	49.55	8 Q	49.44	8
Grant Hackett	200 m freestyle	1:49.23	9 Q	1:48.76	7 Q	1:49.46	8
Grant Hackett	400 m freestyle	3:48.91	8 Q	—N/a		3:48.22	7
Grant Hackett	1500 m freestyle	15:07.50	3 Q	—N/a		14:48.33	1st place, gold medalist(s)
Regan Harrison	200 m breaststroke	2:14.85	7 Q	2:13.75	7 Q	2:12.88	4
Brett Hawke	50 m freestyle	22.45	7 Q	22.49	=13	Did not advance	
Geoff Huegill	100 m butterfly	52.79	2 Q	51.96	1 Q	52.22	3rd place, bronze medalist(s)
Michael Klim	100 m freestyle	49.09	2 Q	48.80	2 Q	48.74	4
Michael Klim	100 m butterfly	52.73	1 Q	52.63	2 Q	52.18	2nd place, silver medalist(s)
Ryan Mitchell	200 m breaststroke	2:14.69	5 Q	2:13.87	8 Q	2:14.00	8
Justin Norris	200 m butterfly	1:57.60	4 Q	1:57.10	6 Q	1:56.17	3rd place, bronze medalist(s)
Justin Norris	400 m individual medley	4:17.36	=6 Q	—N/a		4:17.87	6
Kieren Perkins	1500 m freestyle	14:58.34	1 Q	—N/a		14:53.59	2nd place, silver medalist(s)
Heath Ramsay	200 m butterfly	1:58.82	12 Q	1:57.90	11	Did not advance	
Phil Rogers	100 m breaststroke	1:02.77	17	Did not advance			
Ian Thorpe	200 m freestyle	1:46.56	1 Q	1:45.37	2 Q	1:45.83	2nd place, silver medalist(s)
Ian Thorpe	400 m freestyle	3:44.65	1 Q	—N/a		3:40.59	1st place, gold medalist(s)
Robert van der Zant	200 m individual medley	2:02.77	11 Q	2:02.91	14	Did not advance	
Josh Watson	100 m backstroke	55.09	4 Q	54.93	3 Q	55.01	4
Matt Welsh	100 m backstroke	54.70	2 Q	54.52	2 Q	54.07	2nd place, silver medalist(s)
Matt Welsh	200 m backstroke	1:59.76	4 Q	1:58.57	3 Q	1:57.59	3rd place, bronze medalist(s)
Ashley Callus; Chris Fydler; Michael Klim; Todd Pearson*; Adam Pine*; Ian Thorpe	4 × 100 m freestyle relay	3:17.37	2 Q	—N/a		3:13.67	1st place, gold medalist(s)
Grant Hackett*; Bill Kirby; Michael Klim; Daniel Kowalski*; Todd Pearson; Ian Thorpe	4 × 200 m freestyle relay	7:14.27	1 Q	—N/a		7:07.05	1st place, gold medalist(s)
Regan Harrison; Geoff Huegill; Michael Klim; Ryan Mitchell*; Adam Pine*; Ian Thorpe*; Josh Watson*; Matt Welsh	4 × 100 m medley relay	3:39.38	5 Q	—N/a		3:35.27	2nd place, silver medalist(s)

Women

Athlete	Events	Heat		Semifinal		Final	
Athlete	Events	Time	Rank	Time	Rank	Time	Rank
Rebecca Brown	200 m breaststroke	2:28.24	12 Q	2:29.90	14	Did not advance	
Dyana Calub	100 m backstroke	1:02.46	10 Q	1:01.86	8 Q	1:01.61	7
Dyana Calub	200 m backstroke	2:14.61	24	Did not advance			
Sarah-Jane D'Arcy	400 m freestyle	4:18.05	27	—N/a		Did not advance	
Kasey Giteau	400 m freestyle	4:15.54	18	—N/a		Did not advance	
Rachel Harris	800 m freestyle	8:36.94	12	—N/a		Did not advance	
Rachel Harris	400 m individual medley	4:46.02	12	—N/a		Did not advance	
Caroline Hildreth	200 m breaststroke	2:27.60	7 Q	2:28.30	10	Did not advance	
Leisel Jones	100 m breaststroke	1:07.92	3 Q	1:08.03	4 Q	1:07.49	2nd place, silver medalist(s)
Hayley Lewis	800 m freestyle	8:38.75	13	—N/a		Did not advance	
Susie O'Neill	50 m freestyle	25.73	12 Q	25.74	12	Did not advance	
Susie O'Neill	100 m freestyle	57.78	31	Did not advance			
Susie O'Neill	200 m freestyle	1:59.14	1 Q	1:59.37	1 Q	1:58.24	1st place, gold medalist(s)
Susie O'Neill	100 m butterfly	59.49	9 Q	59.05	7 Q	59.27	7
Susie O'Neill	200 m butterfly	2:07.97	2 Q	2:07.57	1 Q	2:06.58	2nd place, silver medalist(s)
Elli Overton	200 m individual medley	2:16.76	14 Q	2:15.74	11	Did not advance	
Jennifer Reilly	400 m individual medley	4:41.51	5 Q	—N/a		4:45.99	8
Giaan Rooney	200 m freestyle	2:00.99	13 Q	2:00.84	14	Did not advance	
Giaan Rooney	100 m backstroke	1:03.20	=19	Did not advance			
Sarah Ryan	50 m freestyle	26.05	=23	Did not advance			
Sarah Ryan	100 m freestyle	56.05	12 Q	55.93	12	Did not advance	
Clementine Stoney	200 m backstroke	2:14.61	14 Q	2:14.25	13	Did not advance	
Petria Thomas	100 m butterfly	58.52	3 Q	58.11	2 Q	58.49	4
Petria Thomas	200 m butterfly	2:08.70	=3 Q	2:07.63	2 Q	2:07.12	3rd place, bronze medalist(s)
Tarnee White	100 m breaststroke	1:08.35	5 Q	1:08.61	6 Q	1:09.09	7
Anna Windsor	200 m individual medley	2:19.44	25	Did not advance			
Melanie Dodd*; Elka Graham; Susie O'Neill; Giaan Rooney; Sarah Ryan	4 × 100 m freestyle relay	3:43.56	5 Q	—N/a		3:40.91	6
Elka Graham*; Susie O'Neill; Giaan Rooney; Petria Thomas; Kirsten Thomson; Jacinta van Lint*	4 × 200 m freestyle relay	8:03.26	2 Q	—N/a		7:58.52	2nd place, silver medalist(s)
Dyana Calub; Leisel Jones; Susie O'Neill; Giaan Rooney*; Sarah Ryan*; Petria Thomas; Tarnee White*	4 × 100 m medley relay	4:04.75	1 Q	—N/a		4:01.59	2nd place, silver medalist(s)

== Synchronized swimming ==
Athlete	Event	Technical routine		Free routine (preliminary)			Free routine (final)		
Athlete	Event	Points	Rank	Points	Total (technical + free)	Rank	Points	Total (technical + free)	Rank
Irena Olevsky; Naomi Young	Duet	87.267	16	86.867	87.007	16	Did not advance		
Tracey Davis; Kelly Geraghty; Amanda Laird; Dannielle Liesch; Katrina Orpwood; Rachel Ren; Cathryn Wightman; Naomi Young	Team	89.667	8	—N/a			89.400	89.493	8

== Table tennis ==
Men

Athlete	Event	Group stage			Round of 32	Round of 16	Quarterfinals	Semifinals	Final / BM	
Athlete	Event	Opposition Result	Opposition Result	Rank	Opposition Result	Opposition Result	Opposition Result	Opposition Result	Opposition Result	Rank
Simon Gerada	Singles	Błaszczyk (POL); L 0-3	Crișan (ROU); L 0-3	3	Did not advance					
Russ Lavale	Singles	Heister (NED); L 0-3	Krzeszewski (POL); L 0-3	3	Did not advance					
Mark Smythe	Singles	Ryu (KOR); L 0-3	Leung (HKG); W 3-2	2	Did not advance					
Brett Clarke; Jeff Plumb	Doubles	Grujić (SCG) / Lupulesku (SCG); L 0-2	Boll (GER) / Roßkopf (GER); L 0-2	3	Did not advance					
Simon Gerada; Mark Smythe	Doubles	Cheung (HKG) / Leung (HKG); L 0-2	Kreanga (GRE) / Tsiokas (GRE); L 0-2	3	Did not advance					

Women

Athlete	Event	Group stage			Round of 32	Round of 16	Quarterfinals	Semifinals	Final / BM	
Athlete	Event	Opposition Result	Opposition Result	Rank	Opposition Result	Opposition Result	Opposition Result	Opposition Result	Opposition Result	Rank
Miao Miao	Singles	Sakata (JPN); L 0-3	Oshonaike (NGR); W 3-0	2	Did not advance					
Shirley Zhou	Singles	Geng (CAN); L 0-3	Komwong (THA); W 3-1	2	Did not advance					
Stella Zhou	Singles	Gao (USA); L 0-3	Bakula (CRO); L 2-3	2	Did not advance					
Lay Jian Fang; Stella Zhou	Doubles	Paškauskienė (LTU) / Prūsienė (LTU); L 0-2	Naito (JPN) / Sakata (JPN); L 1-2	3	Did not advance					
Miao Miao; Shirley Zhou	Doubles	Herczig (AUT) / Liu Jia (AUT); W 2-1	Geng (CAN) / Roussy (CAN); W 2-1	1 Q	—N/a	Ni (LUX) / Regenwetter (LUX); W 3-2	Sun (CHN) / Yang (CHN); L 0-3	Did not advance		

== Taekwondo ==
Athlete	Event	Preliminary round	Quarterfinals	Semifinals	Repechage round 1	Repechage round 2	Bronze medal	Final	
Athlete	Event	Opposition Result	Opposition Result	Opposition Result	Opposition Result	Opposition Result	Opposition Result	Opposition Result	Rank
Paul Lyons	Men's –58kg	Sekkat (MAR); L 4–4 SUP	Did not advance						
Carlo Massimino	Men's –68kg	Zas (ESP); W 3–3 SUP	Lopez (USA); L 1–1 SUP	Did not advance	Nolano (ITA); W 9–7	Saei (IRI); L 5–6	Did not advance		
Warren Hansen	Men's –80kg	Dahmani (DEN); W 6–5	Ebnoutalib (GER); L 1–2	Did not advance	Al-Fararjeh (JOR); W 5–4	Livaja (SWE); L 0–1	Did not advance		
Daniel Trenton	Men's +80kg	Thoren (SWE); W 6–3	Daley (GBR); W 8–4	Castro (COL); W 8–2	Bye			Kim (KOR); L 2–6	2nd place, silver medalist(s)
Lauren Burns	Women's –49kg	Bye	Chi (TPE); W 3–3 SUP	Poulsen (DEN); W 1–0	Bye			Melendez (CUB); W 4–2	1st place, gold medalist(s)
Cynthia Cameron	Women's –57kg	Hsu (TPE); L 0–6	Did not advance						
Lisa O'Keefe	Women's –67kg	Mueskens (NED); L 6–8	Did not advance						
Tanya White	Women's +67kg	Chen (CHN); L 0–6	Did not advance		Bourguigue (MAR); L 1–3	Did not advance			

== Tennis ==
Men

Athlete	Event	Round of 64	Round of 32	Round of 16	Quarterfinals	Semifinals	Final / BM	
Athlete	Event	Opposition Score	Opposition Score	Opposition Score	Opposition Score	Opposition Score	Opposition Score	Rank
Lleyton Hewitt	Singles	Mirnyi (BLR); L 3–6, 3–6	Did not advance					
Andrew Ilie	Singles	Vicente (ESP); L 3–6, 3–6	Did not advance					
Mark Philippoussis	Singles	Johansson (SWE); W 7–6^{(8–6)}, 6–4	Pless (DEN); W 6–4, 6–4	Kafelnikov (RUS); L 6–7^{(4–7)}, 3–6	Did not advance			
Pat Rafter	Singles	Spadea (USA); W 6–4, 6–3	Nestor (CAN); L 5–7, 6–7^{(4–7)}	Did not advance				
Todd Woodbridge; Mark Woodforde	Doubles	—N/a	Bye	Bhupathi / Paes (IND); W 6–3, 7–6^{(7–1)}	Hrbatý / Kučera (SVK); W 7–6^{(7–5)}, 6–4	Corretja / Costa (ESP); W 6–3, 7–6^{(7–5)}	Lareau / Nestor (CAN); L 7–5, 3–6, 4–6, 6–7^{(2–7)}	2nd place, silver medalist(s)

Women

Athlete	Event	Round of 64	Round of 32	Round of 16	Quarterfinals	Semifinals	Final / BM	
Athlete	Event	Opposition Score	Opposition Score	Opposition Score	Opposition Score	Opposition Score	Opposition Score	Rank
Jelena Dokic	Singles	Sugiyama (JPN); W 6–0, 7–6^{(7–1)}	Grande (ITA); W 5–7, 6–3, 6–3	de los Ríos (PAR); W 7–6^{(7–5)}, 7-5	Coetzer (RSA); W 6–1, 1–6, 6–1	Dementieva (RUS); L 6–2, 4–6, 4–6	Seles (USA); L 1–6, 4–6	4
Alicia Molik	Singles	Schett (AUT); L 6–7^{(7–9)}, 2–6	Did not advance					
Nicole Pratt	Singles	Dragomir (ROM); W 6–3, 6–3	Dechy (FRA); L 3–6, 1–6	Did not advance				
Jelena Dokic; Rennae Stubbs	Doubles	—N/a	Malhotra / Vaidyanathan (IND); W 6–0, 6–0	Boogert / Oremans (NED); L 6–2, 6–7^{(4–7)}, 4–6	Did not advance			

== Trampolining ==
Athlete	Event	Qualification		Final	
Athlete	Event	Score	Rank	Score	Rank
Ji Wallace	Men's	—N/a		39.30	2nd place, silver medalist(s)

== Triathlon ==
Athlete	Event	Swim (1.5 km)	Bike (40 km)	Run (10 km)	Total Time	Rank
Peter Robertson	Men's	18:47.49	58:40.90	34:10.65	1:51:39.04	34
Miles Stewart	Men's	18:20.49	58:59.60	31:54.43	1:49:14.52	6
Craig Walton	Men's	17:43.89	59:36.80	33:36.97	1:50:57.66	27
Nicole Hackett	Women's	19:41.08	1:05:37.10	37:52.63	2:03:10.81	9
Loretta Harrop	Women's	19:37.98	1:05:40.70	36:24.14	2:01:42.82	5
Michellie Jones	Women's	19:43.88	1:05:32.90	35:25.77	2:00:42.55	2nd place, silver medalist(s)

== Volleyball ==
Men's team roster

- David Beard
- Ben Hardy
- Dan Howard
- Nathan Jakavicius
- Steve Keir
- Ben Loft
- Spiros Marazios
- Scott Newcomb
- Dan Ronan
- Hidde Van Beest
- Russell Wentworth
- Mark Williams
- Head coach: Stelio de Rocco

Women's team roster

- Tamsin Barnett
- Louise Bawden
- Sandi Bowen
- Liz Brett
- Majella Brown
- Angela Clarke
- Bea Daly
- Renae Maycock
- Christie Mokotupu
- Priscilla Ruddle
- Selina Scoble
- Rachel White
- Head coach: Brad Saindon

Results

Team	Event	Group stage						Quarterfinal	Semifinal	Final / BM	
Team	Event	Opposition Score	Opposition Score	Opposition Score	Opposition Score	Opposition Score	Rank	Opposition Score	Opposition Score	Opposition Score	Rank
Australia men's	Men's tournament	Brazil; L 0-3	Netherlands; L 0-3	Spain; W 3-1	Cuba; L 0-3	Egypt; W 3-0	4 Q	Italy; L 1-3	5-8th semifinal Netherlands; L 0-3	7/8th place match Cuba; L 0-3	8
Australia women's	Women's tournament	Croatia; L 1-3	Brazil; L 0-3	Kenya; W 3-1	United States; L 0-3	China; L 0-3	5	Did not advance			=9

== Water polo ==
Men's team roster

- Sean Boyd
- Eddie Denis
- Andriy Kovalenko
- Daniel Marsden
- Craig Miller
- Tim Neesham
- Mark Oberman
- Rod Owen-Jones
- Rafael Sterk
- Nathan Thomas
- Grant Waterman
- Thomas Whalan
- Gavin Woods
- Head coach: Don Cameron

Women's team roster

- Naomi Castle
- Joanne Fox
- Bridgette Gusterson
- Simone Hankin
- Yvette Higgins
- Kate Hooper
- Bronwyn Mayer
- Gail Miller
- Melissa Mills
- Debbie Watson
- Liz Weekes
- Danielle Woodhouse
- Taryn Woods
- Head coach: István Görgényi

Results

Team	Event	Group stage						Quarterfinal	Semifinal	Final / BM	
Team	Event	Opposition Score	Opposition Score	Opposition Score	Opposition Score	Opposition Score	Rank	Opposition Score	Opposition Score	Opposition Score	Rank
Australia men's	Men's tournament	Russia; L 4-6	Kazakhstan; D 11-11	Slovakia; W 11-6	Italy; L 5-6	Spain; D 7-7	4 Q	FR Yugoslavia; L 3-7	5-8th semifinals Italy; L 4-8	7/8th place match Croatia; L 8-10	8
Australia women's	Women's tournament	Kazakhstan; W 9-2	Russia; W 6-3	Netherlands; L 4-5	United States; W 7-6	Canada; W 9-4	1 Q	—N/a	Russia; W 7-6	United States; W 4-3	1st place, gold medalist(s)

== Weightlifting ==
Men

Athlete	Event	Snatch			Clean & jerk			Total	Rank
Athlete	Event	1	2	3	1	2	3	Total	Rank
Mehmet Yagci	– 56 kg	~~100.0~~	100.0	105.0	125.0	130.0	~~135.0~~	235.0	17
Yurik Sarkisyan	– 62 kg	125.0	~~130.0~~	~~130.0~~	160.0	165.0	~~167.5~~	290.0	9
Damian Brown	– 77 kg	~~145.0~~	145.0|	~~150.0~~	~~170.0~~	170.0	175.0	320.0	14
Sergo Chakhoyan	– 85 kg	170.0	175.0	~~177.5~~	202.5	~~207.5~~	~~207.5~~	377.5	6
Kiril Kounev	– 94 kg	165.0	170.0	~~172.5~~	205.0	~~212.5~~	~~212.5~~	375.0	14
Anthony Martin	+ 105 kg	157.5	~~162.5~~	162.5	200.0	207.5	~~215.0~~	370.0	18
Chris Rae	+ 105 kg	155.0	~~160.0~~	~~160.0~~	195.0	205.0	~~212.5~~	360.0	19

Women

Athlete	Event	Snatch			Clean & jerk			Total	Rank
Athlete	Event	1	2	3	1	2	3	Total	Rank
Natasha Barker	– 58 kg	~~77.5~~	77.5	~~82.5~~	97.5	102.5	~~105.0~~	180.0	10
Meagan Warthold	– 58 kg	75.0	~~80.0~~	~~80.0~~	95.0	100.0	~~102.5~~	175.0	12
Amanda Phillips	– 63 kg	77.5	~~82.5~~	82.5	100.0	105.0	107.5	190.0	6
Michelle Kettner	– 69 kg	~~95.0~~	95.0	100.0	115.0	120.0	122.5	222.5	9

== Wrestling ==
Men's freestyle

Athlete	Event	Elimination		Quarterfinal	Semifinal	Final	Rank
Athlete	Event	Pools	Rank	Quarterfinal	Semifinal	Final	Rank
Cory O'Brien	58 kg	Oyuunbilegiin Pürevbaatar (MGL); L 0–9	Pool 2; 3	Did not advance			17
Cory O'Brien	58 kg	Aleksandr Guzov (BLR); L 4–14	Pool 2; 3	Did not advance			17
Musa Ilhan	63 kg	Jang Jae-sung (KOR); L 0–10	Pool 6; 4	Did not advance			18
Musa Ilhan	63 kg	Shamil Afandiyev (AZE); L 0–10	Pool 6; 4	Did not advance			18
Musa Ilhan	63 kg	Štefan Fernyák (SVK); L	Pool 6; 4	Did not advance			18
Cameron Johnston	69 kg	Sergey Demchenko (BLR); L 0–10	Pool 6; 3	Did not advance			13
Cameron Johnston	69 kg	Ruslan Veliyev (KAZ); W	Pool 6; 3	Did not advance			13
Cameron Johnston	69 kg	Almazbek Askarov (KGZ); L 0–10	Pool 6; 3	Did not advance			13
Rein Ozoline	76 kg	Marcin Jurecki (POL); L 0–10	Pool 5; 4	Did not advance			17
Rein Ozoline	76 kg	Moon Eui-jae (KOR); L 0–11	Pool 5; 4	Did not advance			17
Rein Ozoline	76 kg	Alik Muzayev (UKR); L 3–16	Pool 5; 4	Did not advance			17
Igor Praporshchikov	85 kg	Adam Saitiev (RUS); L 0–11	Pool 3; 3	Did not advance			19
Igor Praporshchikov	85 kg	Beibulat Musaev (BLR); L 0–13	Pool 3; 3	Did not advance			19
Gabriel Szerda	97 kg	Aleksandr Shemarov (BLR); L 0–7	Pool 5; 4	Did not advance			17
Gabriel Szerda	97 kg	Marek Garmulewicz (POL); L 0–3	Pool 5; 4	Did not advance			17
Gabriel Szerda	97 kg	Dean Schmeichel (CAN); W 4–2	Pool 5; 4	Did not advance			17

Men's Greco-Roman

Athlete	Event	Elimination		Quarterfinal	Semifinal	Final	Rank
Athlete	Event	Pools	Rank	Quarterfinal	Semifinal	Final	Rank
Brett Cash	58 kg	Nepes Gukulov (TKM); L 0–10	Pool 5; 4	Did not advance			17
Brett Cash	58 kg	Armen Nazaryan (BUL); L 2–13	Pool 5; 4	Did not advance			17
Brett Cash	58 kg	Makoto Sasamoto (JPN); L 0–25	Pool 5; 4	Did not advance			17
Ali Abdo	69 kg	Ender Memet (ROU); L 0–11	Pool 2; 3	Did not advance			18
Ali Abdo	69 kg	Filiberto Azcuy (CUB); L 0–10	Pool 2; 3	Did not advance			18
Arek Olczak	85 kg	Eddy Bartolozzi (VEN); L 0–3	Pool 5; 4	Did not advance			17
Arek Olczak	85 kg	Sándor Bárdosi (HUN); L 0–12	Pool 5; 4	Did not advance			17
Arek Olczak	85 kg	Martin Lidberg (SWE); L	Pool 5; 4	Did not advance			17
Ben Vincent	97 kg	Urs Bürgler (SUI); L 0–11	Pool 5; 4	Did not advance			20
Ben Vincent	97 kg	Konstantinos Thanos (GRE); L 0–11	Pool 5; 4	Did not advance			20
Ben Vincent	97 kg	Park Woo (KOR); L 0–11	Pool 5; 4	Did not advance			20
Laszlo Kovacs	130 kg	Rafael Barreno (VEN); L 0–4	Pool 3; 4	Did not advance			18
Laszlo Kovacs	130 kg	Georgiy Saldadze) (UKR); L 0–6	Pool 3; 4	Did not advance			18

== See also ==
- Australia at the 2000 Summer Paralympics
- Australia at the 1998 Commonwealth Games
- Australia at the 2002 Commonwealth Games

== Notes ==
- Wallechinsky, David (2004). The Complete Book of the Summer Olympics (Athens 2004 Edition). Toronto, Canada. ISBN 1-894963-32-6.
- International Olympic Committee (2001). The Results. Retrieved 12 November 2005.
- Sydney Organising Committee for the Olympic Games (2001). Official Report of the XXVII Olympiad Volume 1: Preparing for the Games. Retrieved 20 November 2005.
- Sydney Organising Committee for the Olympic Games (2001). Official Report of the XXVII Olympiad Volume 2: Celebrating the Games. Retrieved 20 November 2005.
- Sydney Organising Committee for the Olympic Games (2001). The Results. Retrieved 20 November 2005.
- International Olympic Committee Web Site
