= Volleyball at the 2000 Summer Olympics – Women's team rosters =

This article show all participating team squads at the Women's Olympic Volleyball Tournament at the 2000 Summer Olympics in Sydney, Australia.

== Group A ==
=== Australia ===
- Head Coach: Brad Saindon

#	Name	Date of birth	Height	Weight	Spike	Block
—	Tamsin Barnett	10.03.1980	192	73
—	Louise Bawden	07.08.1981	182	65
—	Sandi Bowen	12.02.1976	180	73
—	Liz Brett (L)	10.01.1979	182	79
—	Majella Brown	02.02.1980	187	80
—	Angela Clarke	02.11.1975	186	70
—	Bea Daly	15.04.1981	187	72
—	Renae Maycock	21.01.1980	187	68
—	Christie Mokotupu	10.05.1983	183	78
—	Priscilla Ruddle	12.07.1976	183	85
—	Selina Scoble	18.10.1977	184	72
—	Rachel White	30.10.1974	180	76

=== Brazil ===
- Head Coach: Bernardo Rezende

#	Name	Date of birth	Height	Weight	Spike	Block
2	Elisângela Oliveira	30.10.1978	184	81
3	Janina Conceição	25.10.1972	192	82	312	288
4	Raquel Silva	30.04.1978	191	69	300	282
5	Ricarda Lima (L)	12.09.1970	185	66
7	Hélia Souza	10.03.1970	175	63	283	265
8	Leila Barros	30.09.1971	178	71	300	291
9	Walewska Oliveira	01.10.1979	190	73
10	Virna Dias	31.08.1971	186	70	306	294
11	Karin Rodrigues	08.11.1971	187	77	309	285
14	Kely Fraga	03.10.1974	193	79
16	Erika Coimbra	23.03.1980	180	64	301	280
17	Kátia Lopes	13.07.1973	172	64

=== China ===
- Head Coach: Hu Jin

#	Name	Date of birth	Height	Weight	Spike	Block
—	Chen Jing	03.09.1975	182	73
—	Gui Chaoran	08.01.1976	184	74
—	He Qi	24.08.1973	178	68
—	Li Shan	21.05.1980	185	73
—	Li Yan (L)	01.05.1976	178	75
—	Qiu Aihua	28.01.1977	182	75
—	Sun Yue	15.03.1973	186	76
—	Wang Lina	05.02.1978	181	75
—	Wu Dan	13.10.1967	177	70
—	Wu Yongmei	01.01.1975	186	74
—	Yin Yin	02.01.1974	183	73
—	Zhu Yunying	15.01.1978	175	64

=== Croatia ===
- Head Coach: Ivica Jelic

#	Name	Date of birth	Height	Weight	Spike	Block
—	Marija Anzulovic (L)	30.10.1968	178	65
—	Elena Cebukina	11.10.1965	188	77
—	Patricia Danicic	21.04.1978	183	80
—	Biljana Gligorovic	31.01.1982	182	65
—	Barbara Jelic	08.05.1977	193	81	322
—	Vesna Jelic	22.03.1982	183	65
—	Gordana Jurcan	01.05.1971	191	71
—	Ana Kastelan	22.04.1980	185	75
—	Natasa Leto	27.05.1976	183	66
—	Marijana Ribicic	21.02.1979	186	74
—	Beti Rimac	14.01.1976	191	75
—	Ingrid Siscovich	06.06.1980	183	71

=== Kenya ===
- Head Coach: Sadatoshi Sugawara

#	Name	Date of birth	Height	Weight	Spike	Block
—	Mary Ayuma	23.10.1966	168	71
—	Violet Barasa	21.06.1975	178	65
—	Ednah Chepngeno	15.07.1977	178	72
—	Margaret Indakala	24.08.1962	178	75
—	Jackline Makokha	15.11.1974	175	63
—	Roselidah Mangala	23.12.1973	180	70
—	Gladys Nasikanda	25.07.1978	181	75
—	Dorcas Ndasaba	31.03.1971	174	72
—	Judith Serenge	21.01.1971	162	62
—	Nancy Waswa	28.12.1971	174	60
—	Doris Wefwafwa	24.12.1966	170	72
—	Emily Wesutila (L)	08.03.1973	153	60

=== United States ===
- Head Coach: Mick Haley

#	Name	Date of birth	Height	Weight	Spike	Block
1	Demetria Sance	19.08.1977	180	80
2	Danielle Scott	01.10.1972	188	83
5	Stacy Sykora (L)	24.06.1977	175	61
7	Heather Bown	29.11.1978	188	90
8	Charlene Tagaloa	30.08.1973	176	71
9	Kerri Walsh	15.08.1978	189	73
10	Mickisha Hurley	06.03.1975	183	66	317	305
11	Robin Ah Mow (c)	15.09.1975	172	66	291	281
13	Tara Cross-Battle	16.09.1968	180	76
15	Logan Tom	25.05.1981	184	80
16	Sarah Noriega	24.04.1976	189	70	323	307
18	Allison Weston	19.02.1974	183	77	309	295

== Group B ==
=== Cuba ===
- Head Coach: Luis Calderon

#	Name	Date of birth	Height	Weight	Spike	Block
1	Yumilka Ruiz	08.05.1978	179	65	329	311
2	Marlenis Costa	30.07.1973	176	76	334	312
3	Mireya Luis	28.08.1967	175		335	316
4	Lilian Izquierdo	10.02.1967	174		319	308
6	Idalmis Gato	30.08.1971	178
8	Regla Bell	06.07.1971	181		326	315
10	Regla Torres	12.02.1975	192		342	332
12	Taismary Agüero	05.03.1977	177		318	304
14	Ana Fernández	03.08.1973	187		326	312
16	Mirka Francia	14.02.1975	184		324	310
17	Martha Sánchez	17.05.1973	184		324	310
18	Zoila Barros	06.08.1976	188	76

=== Germany ===
- Head Coach: Lee Hee-Wan

#	Name	Date of birth	Height	Weight	Spike	Block
—	Christina Benecke	14.10.1974	190	80
—	Beatrice Doemeland	04.08.1973	178	63
—	Judith Flemig	22.05.1979	188	63
—	Angelina Grün	02.12.1979	185	67
—	Tanja Hart	24.01.1974	176	70
—	Susanne Lahme	10.09.1968	182	62
—	Hanka Pachale	12.09.1976	190	74
—	Anja-Nadin Pietrek	13.03.1979	185	70
—	Sylvia Roll	29.05.1973	180	72
—	Christina Schultz	10.11.1969	190	78
—	Judith Sylvester	13.10.1977	193	78
—	Kerstin Tzscherlich (L)	15.02.1978	179	75

=== Italy ===
- Head Coach: Angelo Frigoni

#	Name	Date of birth	Height	Weight	Spike	Block
—	Sabrina Bertini	30.10.1969	182	75
—	Antonella Bragaglia	04.02.1973	184	76
—	Maurizia Cacciatori	06.04.1973	178	64
—	Ana Paula de Tassis (L)	05.11.1965	179	73
—	Manuela Leggeri	09.05.1976	186	74	312	281
—	Eleonora Lo Bianco	22.12.1979	171	70	287	273
—	Anna Vania Mello	27.02.1979	187	72	310	278
—	Darina Mifkova	24.05.1974	188	78	308	279
—	Paola Paggi	06.12.1976	182	72	306	278
—	Francesca Piccinini	10.01.1979	184	75	304	279
—	Simona Rinieri	01.09.1977	188	80	307	281
—	Elisa Togut	14.05.1978	193	70	320	295

=== South Korea ===
- Head Coach: Kim Cheol-yong

#	Name	Date of birth	Height	Weight	Spike	Block
—	Chang So-yun	11.11.1974	184	73
—	Choi Kwang-hee	25.05.1974	174	68
—	Chung Sun-hye	17.12.1975	174	68
—	Lee Yeon-sun	12.12.1973	178	65
—	Kang Hye-mi	27.04.1974	172	64
—	Kim Guy-hyun	12.01.1975	171	66
—	Koo Ki-lan (L)	10.03.1977	170	64
—	Ku Min-jung	25.08.1973	182	68
—	Lee Meong-hee	04.07.1978	175	64
—	Lee Yun-hui	08.10.1980	181	74
—	Park Mee-kyung	13.05.1975	181	68
—	Park Soo-jeong	02.03.1972	178	68

=== Peru ===
- Head Coach: Park Man-Bok

#	Name	Date of birth	Height	Weight	Spike	Block
—	Fiorella Aíta	13.07.1977	170	65
—	Milagros Cámere	22.09.1972	178	63
—	Leyla Chihuán	04.09.1975	180	66
—	Iris Falcón	01.11.1973	175	78
—	Rosa García	21.05.1964	175	69
—	Elena Keldibekova	23.06.1974	178	65
—	Natalia Málaga	26.01.1964	170	59
—	Milagros Moy	17.10.1975	174	72
—	Diana Soto	10.02.1980	179	80
—	Jessenia Uceda	14.08.1981	175	69
—	Janet Vasconzuelo (L)	04.07.1969	168	61
—	Yulissa Zamudio	24.03.1976	184	75

=== Russia ===
- Head Coach: Nikolay Karpol

#	Name	Date of birth	Height	Weight	Spike	Block
1	Olga Potachova	26.06.1976	204	98
2	Natalya Morozova (L)	28.01.1973	187	74
3	Anastasiya Belikova	22.07.1979	192	78	305	303
4	Elena Tiourina	12.04.1971	184	86
5	Lioubov Chachkova	04.12.1977	192	73	310	304
6	Elena Godina	17.09.1977	196	72	317	310
8	Evguenia Artamonova	17.07.1975	192	75	315	306
9	Elizaveta Tichtchenko	07.02.1975	190	75	309	302
10	Elena Vassilevskaya	27.02.1978	177	68	296	290
11	Ekaterina Gamova	17.10.1980	204	80
13	Tatyana Gracheva	23.02.1973	181	74
14	Inessa Sargsyan	17.01.1972	190	75
