= Farrance =

Farrance is a surname. Notable people with the surname include:

- Andrew Farrance (born 1972), Australian slalom canoeist
- David Farrance (born 1999), American ice hockey player
- Mia Farrance (born 1973), Australian slalom canoeist
