= Canoeing at the 2000 Summer Olympics – Men's slalom C-2 =

These are the results of the men's C-2 slalom competition in canoeing at the 2000 Summer Olympics. The C-2 (canoe single) event is raced by two-man canoes through a whitewater course. The venue for the 2000 Olympic competition was at Penrith Whitewater Stadium.

== Medalists ==
Gold	Silver	Bronze
Pavol Hochschorner and Peter Hochschorner (SVK)	Krzysztof Kołomański and Michał Staniszewski (POL)	Marek Jiras and Tomáš Máder (CZE)

== Results ==
=== Qualifying ===
The 12 teams each took two runs through the whitewater slalom course on 19 September. The combined score of both runs counted for the event with the top eight advancing to the final the following day.

Rank	Names	Nation	Run 1			Run 2			Result
Rank	Names	Nation	Time	Points	Total	Time	Points	Total	Total
1	Pavol Hochschorner & Peter Hochschorner	Slovakia	130.64	2	132.64	134.49	2	136.49	269.13
2	Frank Adisson & Wilfrid Forgues	France	134.96	0	134.96	135.54	0	135.54	270.50
3	André Ehrenberg & Michael Senft	Germany	134.89	0	134.89	140.65	4	144.65	279.54
4	Stuart Bowman & Nick Smith	Great Britain	138.95	0	138.95	139.65	2	141.65	280.60
5	Marek Jiras & Tomáš Máder	Czech Republic	140.74	2	142.74	139.33	2	141.33	284.07
6	Krzysztof Kołomański & Michał Staniszewski	Poland	144.46	4	148.46	137.48	0	137.48	285.94
7	Andrzej Wójs & Sławomir Mordarski	Poland	142.48	2	144.48	140.48	2	142.48	286.96
8	Jaroslav Volf & Ondřej Štěpánek	Czech Republic	151.29	2	153.29	137.28	0	137.28	290.57
9	Benoît Gauthier & Tyler Lawlor	Canada	156.57	6	163.67	148.54	0	148.54	311.11
10	Toni Herreros & Marc Vicente	Spain	143.93	52	193.95	144.69	4	148.69	344.62
11	Kai Swoboda & Andrew Farrance	Australia	143.32	4	147.32	146.01	54	200.01	347.33
12	Matt Taylor & Lecky Haller	United States	144.43	54	198.43	153.39	2	155.39	353.82

=== Final ===
The eight teams each took two runs through the whitewater slalom course on 20 September. The combined score of both runs counted for the event.

Rank	Name	Nation	Run 1			Run 2			Result
Rank	Name	Nation	Time	Points	Total	Time	Points	Total	Total
1st place, gold medalist(s)	Pavol Hochschorner & Peter Hochschorner	Slovakia	119.01	2	121.01	116.73	0	116.73	237.74
2nd place, silver medalist(s)	Krzysztof Kołomański & Michał Staniszewski	Poland	124.19	0	124.19	119.62	0	119.62	243.81
3rd place, bronze medalist(s)	Marek Jiras & Tomáš Máder	Czech Republic	121.43	2	123.43	122.02	4	126.02	249.45
4	Stuart Bowman & Nick Smith	Great Britain	121.85	2	123.85	126.08	0	126.08	249.93
5	Jaroslav Volf & Ondřej Štěpánek	Czech Republic	126.27	0	126.27	123.09	4	127.09	253.36
6	Andrzej Wójs & Sławomir Mordarski	Poland	119.74	2	121.74	127.77	6	133.77	255.51
7	Frank Adisson & Wilfrid Forgues	France	119.28	0	119.28	119.63	52	171.63	290.91
8	André Ehrenberg & Michael Senft	Germany	123.15	2	125.15	124.63	52	176.63	301.78
