= Stuart Bowman =

Stuart Bowman may refer to:

- Stuart Bowman (actor), Scottish actor
- Stuart Bowman (canoeist) (born 1975), British slalom canoeist
