= 1999 Oceania Badminton Championships =

Tournament details
- Dates: 27 – 30 July
- Nations: 5
- Venue: Sleeman Sports Complex
- Location: Brisbane, Australia

Champions
- Men's singles: (Australia) Rio Suryana
- Women's singles: (New Zealand) Rhona Robertson
- Men's doubles: (Australia) David Bamford (Australia) Peter Blackburn
- Women's doubles: (Australia) Rhonda Cator (Australia) Amanda Hardy
- Mixed doubles: (Australia) Peter Blackburn (Australia) Rhonda Cator

The 1999 Oceania Badminton Championships was the second edition of the Oceania Badminton Championships. The tournament was held from 27 to 30 July at the Sleeman Sports Complex in Brisbane, Australia. Five nations competed in the championships.

== Medal summary ==
=== Medalists ===
Event	Gold	Silver	Bronze
Men's singles	(Australia) Rio Suryana	(New Zealand) Geoff Bellingham	(Australia) Murray Hocking
Men's singles	(Australia) Rio Suryana	(New Zealand) Geoff Bellingham	(New Zealand) Nick Hall
Women's singles	(New Zealand) Rhona Robertson	(Australia) Rayoni Head	(New Zealand) Lianne Shirley
Women's singles	(New Zealand) Rhona Robertson	(Australia) Rayoni Head	(New Zealand) Rebecca Gordon
Men's doubles	(Australia) David Bamford (Australia) Peter Blackburn	(New Zealand) Dean Galt (New Zealand) Daniel Shirley	(New Zealand) Geoff Bellingham (New Zealand) Chris Blair
Men's doubles	(Australia) David Bamford (Australia) Peter Blackburn	(New Zealand) Dean Galt (New Zealand) Daniel Shirley	(Australia) Boyd Cooper (Australia) Travis Denney
Women's doubles	(Australia) Rhonda Cator (Australia) Amanda Hardy	(New Zealand) Li Feng (New Zealand) Tammy Jenkins	(Australia) Rayoni Head (Australia) Kate Wilson-Smith
Women's doubles	(Australia) Rhonda Cator (Australia) Amanda Hardy	(New Zealand) Li Feng (New Zealand) Tammy Jenkins	(New Zealand) Nicole Gordon (New Zealand) Sara Runesten-Petersen
Mixed doubles	(Australia) Peter Blackburn (Australia) Rhonda Cator	(Australia) David Bamford (Australia) Amanda Hardy	(New Zealand) Daniel Shirley (New Zealand) Tammy Jenkins
Mixed doubles	(Australia) Peter Blackburn (Australia) Rhonda Cator	(Australia) David Bamford (Australia) Amanda Hardy	(New Zealand) Dean Galt (New Zealand) Lianne Shirley
Mixed team	Australia	New Zealand	New Caledonia

=== Medal table ===
* Host nation (Australia)

Rank	Nation	Gold	Silver	Bronze	Total
1	Australia*	5	2	3	10
2	New Zealand	1	4	7	12
3	New Caledonia	0	0	1	1
Totals (3 entries)		6	6	11	23

== Individual results ==
=== Men's singles ===
Semi-finals
(Australia) Rio Suryana	17	15
(New Zealand) Nick Hall	7	4
(New Zealand) Geoff Bellingham	9	15	15
(Australia) Murray Hocking	15	9	11

Final
(Australia) Rio Suryana	15	10	15
(New Zealand) Geoff Bellingham	5	15	6

=== Women's singles ===
Semi-finals
(New Zealand) Rhona Robertson	11	11
(New Zealand) Lianne Shirley	0	2
(New Zealand) Rebecca Gordon	11	5	7
(Australia) Rayoni Head	9	11	11

Final
(New Zealand) Rhona Robertson	11	11
(Australia) Rayoni Head	2	5

=== Men's doubles ===
Semi-finals
(Australia) David Bamford (Australia) Peter Blackburn	15	17
(New Zealand) Geoff Bellingham (New Zealand) Chris Blair	11	16
(Australia) Boyd Cooper (Australia) Travis Denney	11	9
(New Zealand) Dean Galt (New Zealand) Daniel Shirley	15	15

Final
(Australia) David Bamford (Australia) Peter Blackburn	15	15
(New Zealand) Dean Galt (New Zealand) Daniel Shirley	10	11

=== Women's doubles ===
Semi-finals
(Australia) Rhonda Cator (Australia) Amanda Hardy	15	15
(New Zealand) Nicole Gordon (New Zealand) Rhona Robertson	8	13
(New Zealand) Li Feng (New Zealand) Tammy Jenkins	15	15
(Australia) Rayoni Head (Australia) Kate Wilson-Smith	3	3

Final
(Australia) Rhonda Cator (Australia) Amanda Hardy	15	15
(New Zealand) Li Feng (New Zealand) Tammy Jenkins	8	7

=== Mixed doubles ===
Semi-finals
(Australia) Peter Blackburn (Australia) Rhonda Cator	15	14	17
(New Zealand) Daniel Shirley (New Zealand) Tammy Jenkins	6	17	14
(Australia) David Bamford (Australia) Amanda Hardy	15	6	15
(New Zealand) Dean Galt (New Zealand) Lianne Shirley	10	15	8

Final
(Australia) Peter Blackburn (Australia) Rhonda Cator	11	15	15
(Australia) David Bamford (Australia) Amanda Hardy	15	3	4

== Team event ==
=== Standings ===
Pos	Team	Pld	W	L	MF	MA	MD	GF	GA	GD	PF	PA	PD	Pts	
1	Australia (H)	4	4	0	29	1	+28	36	5	+31	546	163	+383	4	Gold medal
2	New Zealand	4	3	1	24	6	+18	35	6	+29	546	192	+354	3	Silver medal
3	New Caledonia	4	2	2	18	12	+6	17	25	−8	322	506	−184	2	Bronze medal
4	Fiji	4	1	3	12	18	−6	13	31	−18	320	534	−214	1	
5	Samoa	4	0	4	7	23	−16	4	38	−34	237	576	−339	0	

Source: Badminton Oceania
(H) Host
