= Benoît Gauthier =

Canadian canoeist

Benoît Gauthier (born 30 May 1967 in Saint-Jérôme, Quebec) is a Canadian slalom canoeist who competed from the mid-1990s to the mid-2000s (decade). Competing in two Summer Olympics, he earned his best finish of eighth in the C2 event in Atlanta in 1996.

His partner in the C2 boat for most of his career was François Letourneau. In 2000 he was partnered by Tyler Lawlor.

== World Cup individual podiums ==
| Season | Date | Venue | Position | Event |
|---|---|---|---|---|
| 2005 | 27 Aug 2005 | Kern River | 1st | C2^{1} |

^{1} Pan American Championship counting for World Cup points
