= François Letourneau =

Canadian canoeist

François Letourneau (born 27 May 27, 1969 in Saint-Jérôme, Quebec) is a Canadian slalom canoeist who competed from the late 1980s to the mid-2000s. He finished eighth in the C2 event at the 1996 Summer Olympics in Atlanta.

His partner in the C2 boat throughout his career was Benoît Gauthier.

== World Cup individual podiums ==
Season	Date	Venue	Position	Event
2005	27 Aug 2005	Kern River	1st	C2^{1}

^{1} Pan American Championship counting for World Cup points
