= Toni Herreros =

Spanish canoeist

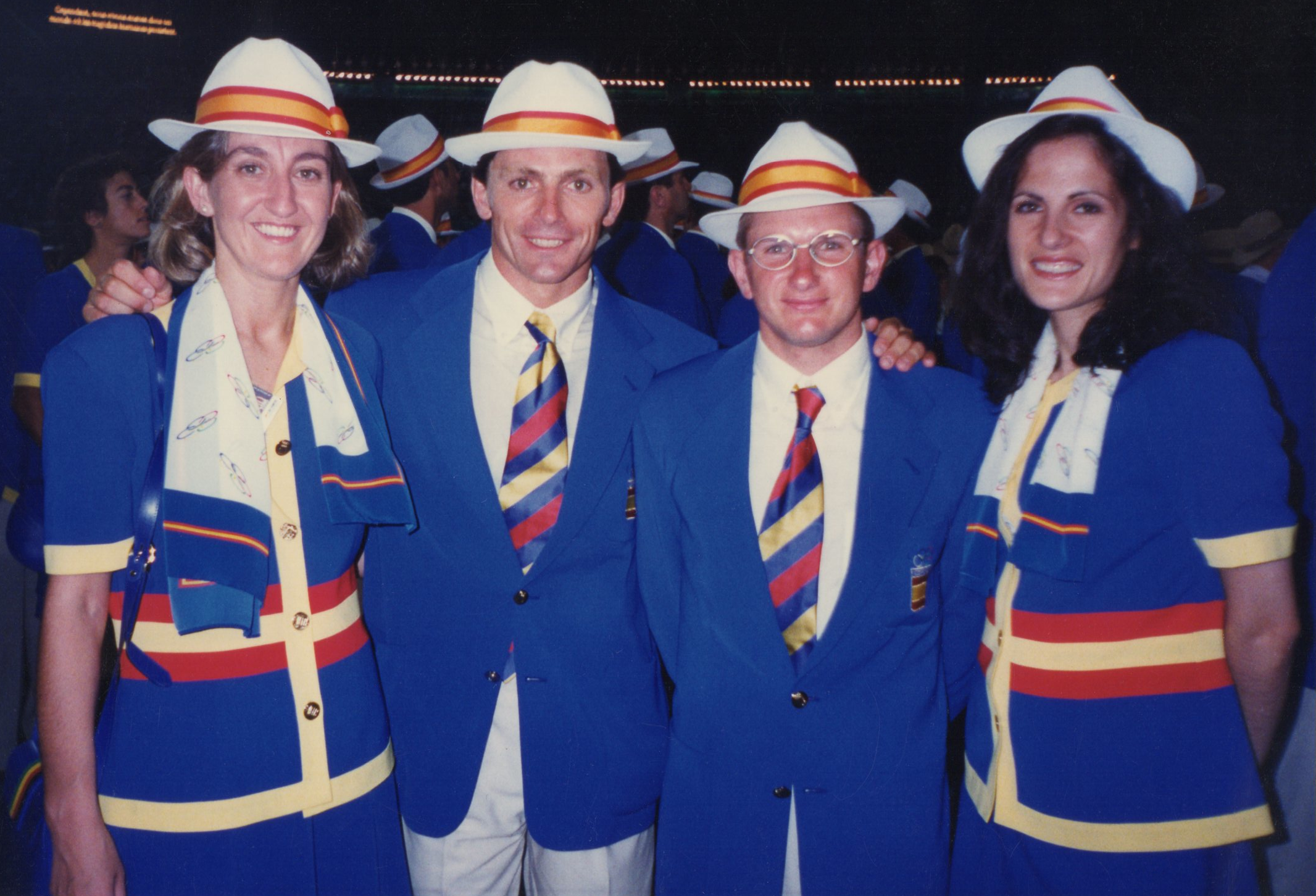
Toni Herreros (right) in 1996 Summer Olympics

Antonio "Toni" Herreros Angrill (born August 24, 1972 in Ponts) is a Spanish slalom canoer who competed from the early 1990s to the mid-2000s (decade). Competing in two Summer Olympics, he earned his best finish of 10th in the C-2 event in Sydney in 2000.
