= Nick Smith (canoeist) =

British slalom canoeist (born 1969)

Nicholas Smith (born 15 November 1969 in Stratford-upon-Avon) is a British slalom canoeist who competed from the mid-1990s to the late 2000s.

== Career ==
Smith represented Great Britain at the Summer Olympics twice, in Sydney 2000 and Athens 2004. He earned his best finish of fourth in the C2 event in Sydney in 2000. His partner in the C2 boat for most of his active career was Stuart Bowman (1997-2006). He also paddled with Daniel Goddard (2007-2008).

== Education ==
Smith studied commerce at Birmingham University and graduated with a B.Com Degree in 1991.

== World Cup individual podiums ==
Season	Date	Venue	Position	Event
2000	9 Jul 2000	La Seu d'Urgell	3rd	C2
2003	11 May 2003	Penrith	2nd	C2
2003	6 Jul 2003	La Seu d'Urgell	3rd	C2
2006	3 Jun 2006	Augsburg	3rd	C2
