= Sarah-Jane D'Arcy =

Australian swimmer

Personal information
- Full name: Sarah-Jane D'Arcy
- National team: Australia
- Born: 2 May 1977 (age 49) Melbourne, Victoria
- Height: 1.85 m (6 ft 1 in)
- Weight: 63 kg (139 lb)

Sport
- Sport: Swimming
- Strokes: Freestyle
- Club: Melbourne Vicentre

Sarah-Jane D'Arcy (born 2 May 1977) is an Australian former swimmer who specialized in middle-distance freestyle events. She represented the host nation Australia at the 2000 Summer Olympics, and also played for the Australian Institute of Sport under her longtime coach and mentor Mark Regan.

== swimming career ==
D'Arcy competed for the host nation in the women's 400-metre freestyle at the 2000 Summer Olympics in Sydney. She finished ahead of her teammate Kasey Giteau from the Olympic trials in Sydney, achieving a FINA A-cut of 4:11.60. She challenged seven other swimmers in heat five, including China's top favorite Chen Hua and Netherlands' Kirsten Vlieghuis, bronze medalist in Atlanta four years earlier. Coming from third at an earlier pace, D'Arcy faded down the stretch to pick up the last spot in her heat at 4:18.05, more than seven seconds below the leading time set by Chen. D'Arcy failed to reach the top 8 final, as she placed twenty-seventh overall out of 39 swimmers in the prelims.
