= Marc Vicente =

Spanish canoeist (born 1973)

Marc Vicente Cases (born 20 November 1973 La Seu d'Urgell) is a Spanish slalom canoeist who competed from the early 1990s to the mid-2000s. Competing in two Summer Olympics, he earned his best finish of 10th in the C-2 event in Sydney in 2000.
