= Sergey Yermishin =

Russian volleyball player and coach

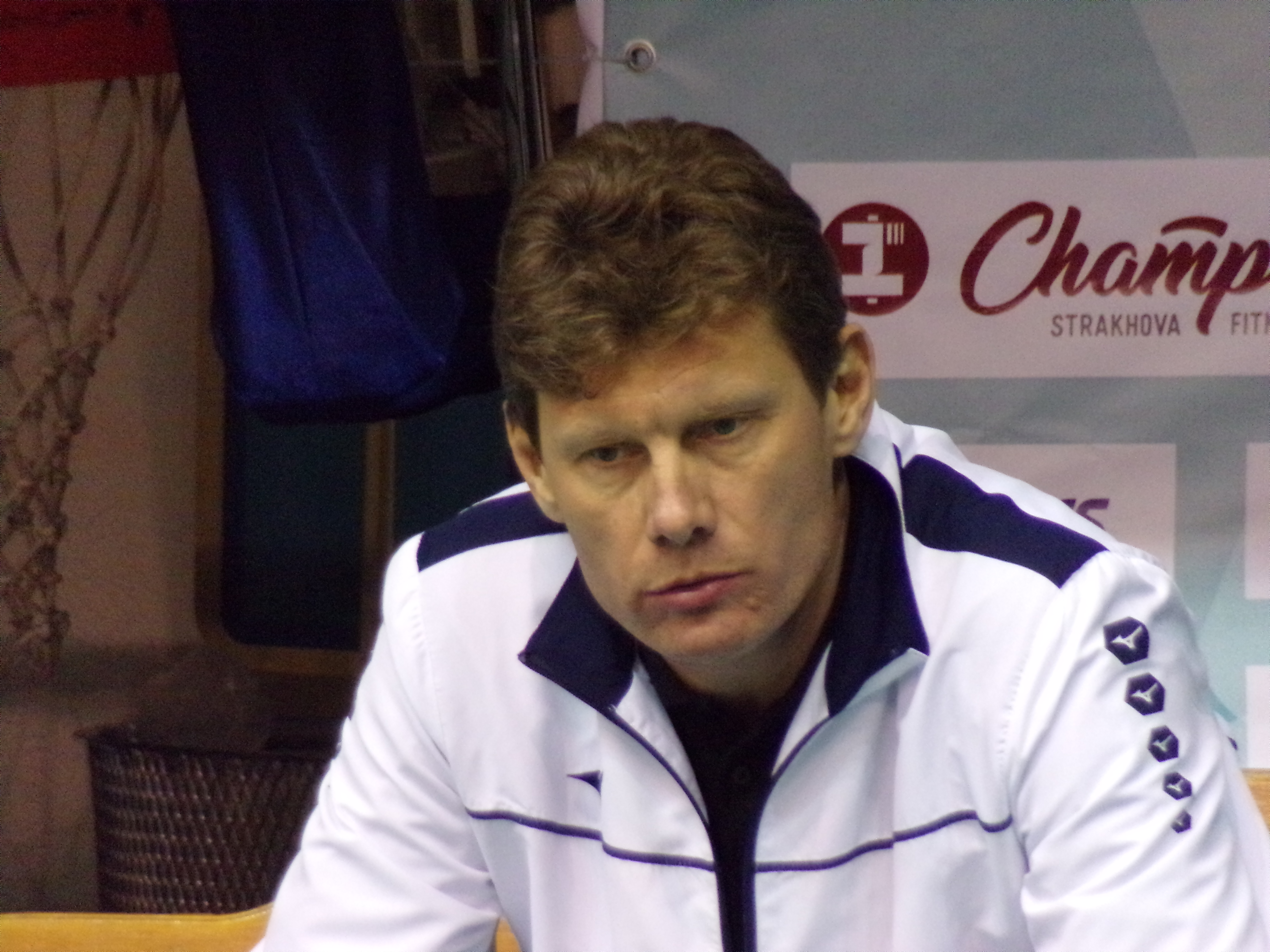

Personal information
- Full name: Sergey Aleksandrovich Yermishin
- Born: 4 June 1970 (age 56); Saratov, Soviet Union
- Height: 208 cm (6 ft 10 in)

Sergey Aleksandrovich Yermishin (Russian: Сергей Александрович Ермишин; born 4 June 1970) is a Russian volleyball coach and former player who had competed at the 2000 Summer Olympics in Sydney.

== Biography ==
Sergey Yermishin was born in Saratov on 4 June 1970.

Yermishin began to play volleyball in Saratov under coach Viktor Rybakov. In 1988, he played for CSKA, in which he repeatedly became the champion of the USSR and Russia, won the European Champions Cup and the European Super Cup. In the early 1990s, he was involved in the Russian national team, and participated in two World League draws (in 1993 and 1995) and at the 1995 European Championship, played 20 games for the national team, in which he scored 36 points and 110 played innings. From 1997 to 2001 he was a player of the Saratov "Energetik".

In 2000, together with Mikhail Kushneryov, he became the bronze medalist of the World Tour stage held in Tenerife, which, along with other high results in the Olympic season, allowed the Russians to become one of the 24 teams participating in the Olympic tournament in Sydney. At the Olympics, the Russian athletes, seeded at number 14, played two matches: they won against Argentinians Mariano Baracetti and José Luis Salema and lost to Canadians John Child and Mark Heese, sharing in the end 9th place with eight other pairs.

In 2001, Yrmishin and Kushneryov became seventh at the Goodwill Games in Brisbane and twice reached the semifinals of the World Tour stage - in Marseille and Mallorca, but in the first case they were disqualified after winning the quarterfinals over the duo from the United States Kevin Wong, and Stein Metzger ... Due to bad weather, the calendar of the Grand Slam tournament held in Marseille turned out to be crumpled, and that day the Russians, who had already played four matches in a row, went to the hotel before the fifth with the consent of the organizers to recover a little. Returning with a slight delay, Yermishin and Kushneryov did not have time to warm up, but were still allowed to the match and won it in a tie-break. However, due to a protest filed by the American team after the match, the result was canceled.

In the same year, Sergei Yermishin moved from Energetik, which had left the Superleague, to Dynamo-MGFSO-Olympus, which, on the other hand, was to make its debut in the strongest division. The result of the first season in Moscow was the bronze medal of the Russian championship. In the fall of 2003, due to an injury, Yermishin was forced to interrupt his sports career.

After a temporary retirement from sports, Yermishin became a member of the Beach Volleyball Council at the All-Russian Volleyball Federation, worked as a teacher at the Department of Theory and Methodology of Volleyball at the Russian State University of Physical Culture, Sports and Tourism, and helped his father, Aleksandr, the former CEO of the Saratov Aviation Plant, in business.

In the fall of 2009, he returned to volleyball and played for two seasons as part of the Gubernia team from Nizhny Novgorod, which rose from the top league “B” (third echelon) of the Russian championship to the Super League. After completing his playing career in 2011, he entered the coaching staff of "Gubernia".

From 2017 to 2018, he worked as an assistant coach in the beach volleyball team Dynamo (Moscow). In February 2019, he headed the women's team "Proton" (Saratov).
