= Sandi Bowen =

Australian volleyball player (born 1976)

Personal information
- Full name: Sandra Bowen
- Nationality: Australian
- Born: 12 February 1976 (age 50); Melbourne, Australia
- Height: 1.80 m (5 ft 11 in)
- Weight: 73 kg (161 lb)

Volleyball information
- Position: Spiker / Setter
- Current club: Monbulk VC
- Number: 10 (national team, 2000 Olympics)

National team
1996–2002	Australia
- Last updated: 2025-08-21

Sandra "Sandi" Bowen (born 12 February 1976 in Melbourne) is a retired Australian volleyball player. She was a member of the Australia women's national volleyball team from 1996 to 2002, competing at both the 2000 Summer Olympics and the 2002 FIVB Volleyball Women's World Championship.

== Career ==
Bowen played over 150 matches for Australia and served as co-captain of the national team from 1999 to 2000. She represented Australia at the 2000 Sydney Olympics, wearing jersey number 10, where the team finished 9th. She later competed at the 2002 FIVB Volleyball Women's World Championship in Germany, where she wore jersey number 8.

On the domestic level, Bowen played with Monbulk VC.

== Post-playing career ==
After retiring from competition, Bowen became a remedial massage therapist. She holds a Bachelor of Applied Science in Human Movement, a Diploma of Remedial Massage, and additional certifications in dry needling, myofascial cupping, and functional release techniques. She now practices in Caringbah South, New South Wales. Bowen is married to fellow AIS athlete and former wrestler, Sean Smith. They have four daughters.

== Clubs ==
- Monbulk VC (2002)

== See also ==
- Australia at the 2000 Summer Olympics
