= David White (baseball) =

American-Australian baseball player (born 1961)

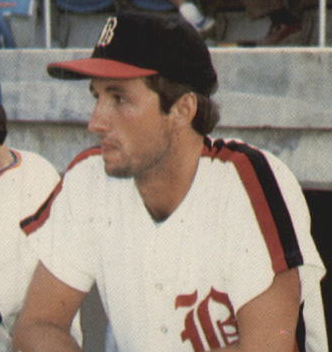
- White with the Birmingham Barons c. 1986
- Born: 18 December 1961 (age 63); Chicago, Illinois, United States
- Throws: Right

David W. White (born 18 December 1961) is an American-Australian baseball player. He competed at the 2000 Summer Olympics.
