= Renae Maycock =

Australian volleyball player (born 1980)

Personal information
- Nationality: Australian
- Born: 21 January 1980 (age 46)
- Height: 1.87 m (6 ft 2 in)
- Weight: 68 kg (150 lb)

National team
2000	Australia

Renae Maycock (born 21 January 1980) was an Australian female volleyball player. She was part of the Australia women's national volleyball team.

She competed with the national team at the 2000 Summer Olympics in Sydney, Australia, finishing 9th.

== See also ==
- Australia at the 2000 Summer Olympics
