= Chris Tanzey =

English-Australian footballer and manager

Personal information
- Full name: Christopher Bernard Tanzey
- Date of birth: 6 March 1957 (age 69)
- Place of birth: Birkenhead, England
- Positions: Defender; midfielder

Senior career*
Years	Team	Apps	(Gls)
	Liverpool	0	(0)
- Downer Olympic
- Griffith City
- Canberra Strikers (futsal)
1989	Tuggeranong United		

International career
1985	Australia (futsal)		

Managerial career
- Canberra City Griffins (youth)
- Downer Olympic
- Canberra Croatia Reserves
- 1990–1991: Canberra City
- 1994–1998: ACT Academy of Sport
- 1999–2000: Australian Institute of Sport
- 1999–2000: Australia Women
- 2003–2005: Belconnen Blue Devils
- * Club domestic league appearances and goals

Christopher Bernard Tanzey (born 6 March 1957) is an English-Australian former football player and manager.

== Career ==
In his playing career, Tanzey was a professional with Liverpool, playing for the club's reserve side. He then played in Australia for Downer Olympic in the ACT League, and later Griffith City FC and Tuggeranong United. He also played futsal for the Canberra Strikers in Australia's National Indoor Soccer League. He represented Australia at the 1985 FIFUSA Futsal World Cup in Spain. He later coached various teams, including Canberra City Griffins youth, Downer Olympic, Canberra Croatia Reserves and Canberra City, and led football at the ACT Academy of Sport and Australian Institute of Sport.

After serving as Assistant National Coach for the 1999 Women's World Cup, Tanzey was appointed as National Coach of the Australia women's soccer team just twelve months before the Sydney 2000 Summer Olympics, where they finished 7th. He was also the coach of the Belconnen Blue Devils during the 2003–04 NSW Premier League season, earning the coach of the year award.

== Personal life ==
Tanzey is a native of Birkenhead, England, but moved to Australia during his career.
