= Ben Loft =

Australian volleyball player (born 1978)

Personal information
- Full name: Benjamin Loft
- Nationality: Australian
- Born: 9 October 1978 (age 48); Melbourne, Victoria
- Height: 206 cm (6 ft 9 in)
- Weight: 93 kg (14.6 st; 205 lb)

National team
2000	Australia

Ben Loft (born 9 October 1978) is an Australian former volleyball player. He was part of the Australia men's national volleyball team. He competed with the national team at the 2000 Summer Olympics in Sydney, Australia, finishing 8th.
