= Selina Scoble =

Australian volleyball player (born 1977)

Personal information
- Nationality: Australian
- Born: 18 October 1977 (age 49)
- Height: 1.84 m (6 ft 0 in)
- Weight: 72 kg (159 lb)

National team
2000	Australia

Selina Scoble OLY (born 18 October 1977) is an Australian female volleyball player. She was part of the Australia women's national volleyball team.

She competed with the national team at the 2000 Summer Olympics in Sydney, Australia, finishing 9th.

== See also ==
- Australia at the 2000 Summer Olympics
