= Lianne Shirley =

New Zealand badminton player (born 1975)

Lianne Estelle Shirley
- Born: 13 October 1975 (age 50); Auckland, New Zealand
- Occupation: Badminton player
- Years active: 1995–2006
- Height: 162 cm (5 ft 4 in)
- Partner: Craig Cooper

Lianne Shirley (born 13 October 1975, in Auckland) is a badminton player from New Zealand. She competed at the 2001 World Badminton Championships in Seville, the 2005 World Badminton Championships in Anaheim and the 2006 Commonwealth Games in Melbourne. With her partner, Craig Cooper, she won the 2004 Canterbury International and the 2004 New Zealand Open in mixed doubles.

Her best result was the reaching the last 16 of the 2001 World Badminton Championships in mixed doubles. Her highest world ranking was 21 in mixed doubles.
