= Christie Mokotupu =

Australian volleyball player (born 1983)

Personal information
- Nickname: Mokas
- Nationality: Australian
- Born: 10 May 1983 (age 43)
- Height: 1.83 m (6 ft 0 in)
- Weight: 74 kg (163 lb)

Volleyball information
- Number: 7

National team
1998–2002	Australia

Christie Mokotupu (born 10 May 1983) is a retired Australian female volleyball player. She was part of the Australia women's national volleyball team.

She competed with the national team at the 2000 Summer Olympics in Sydney, Australia, finishing 9th. She participated in the 2002 FIVB Volleyball Women's World Championship.

== See also ==
- Australia at the 2000 Summer Olympics
