= Grant Waterman =

Australian water polo player

Personal information
- Born: 10 November 1971 (age 54) Sydney, Australia

Sport
- Sport: Water polo

Grant Waterman (born 10 November 1971) is an Australian water polo player who competed in the 2000 Summer Olympics.
