= Majella Brown =

Australian volleyball player (born 1980)

Personal information
- Nationality: Australian
- Born: 2 February 1980 (age 46)
- Height: 1.87 m (6 ft 2 in)
- Weight: 80 kg (176 lb)

National team
2000	Australia

Majella Brown (born 2 February 1980) is an Australian female volleyball player. She was part of the Australia women's national volleyball team.

She competed with the national team at the 2000 Summer Olympics in Sydney, Australia, finishing 9th. She participated in the 2002 FIVB Volleyball Women's World Championship.

== See also ==
- Australia at the 2000 Summer Olympics
