= Amanda Laird =

Australian synchronized swimmer

Personal information
- Born: August 12, 1978 (age 47) Sydney, Australia

Sport
- Sport: Synchronised swimming

Amanda "Mandy" Laird (born 12 August 1978) is an Australian former synchronized swimmer who competed in the 2000 Summer Olympics and in the 2004 Summer Olympics.
