= Katrina Orpwood =

Australian synchronized swimmer

Personal information
- Born: 23 July 1974 (age 51) Melbourne, Australia

Sport
- Sport: Synchronised swimming

Katrina Orpwood (born 23 July 1974) is an Australian synchronized swimmer who competed in the 2000 Summer Olympics.
