= Kai Swoboda =

Australian canoeist

Kai Swoboda (born 4 August 1971 in Canberra) is an Australian slalom canoeist who competed from the late 1990s to the mid-2000s. He finished 11th in the C-2 event at the 2000 Summer Olympics in Sydney. He was an Australian Institute of Sport scholarship holder in 1990–1992 and 2001–2002.
