= Tracey Davis =

Australian synchronised swimmer

Personal information
- Born: 23 July 1977 (age 49) Canberra, Australia

Sport
- Sport: Synchronised swimming
- Club: Oceanas SS

Tracey Davis (born 23 July 1977) is an Australian synchronised swimmer who competed in the 2000 Summer Olympics and secured the 8th position with a score of 89.493.
