= Bea Daly =

Australian volleyball player (born 1981)

Personal information
- Nationality: Australian
- Born: 15 April 1981 (age 45)
- Height: 1.87 m (6 ft 2 in)
- Weight: 72 kg (159 lb)

National team
2000	Australia

Beatrice Daly (born 15 April 1981) is an Australian former volleyball player. She was part of the Australia women's national volleyball team.

She competed with the national team at the 2000 Summer Olympics in Sydney, Australia, finishing 9th.

== See also ==
- Australia at the 2000 Summer Olympics
