= Liz Brett =

Australian volleyball player (born 1979)

Personal information
- Nationality: Australian
- Born: 10 January 1979 (age 47)
- Height: 1.82 m (6 ft 0 in)
- Weight: 79 kg (174 lb)

National team
2000	Australia

Liz Brett (born 10 January 1979) is an Australian female volleyball player. She was part of the Australia women's national volleyball team. She competed with the national team at the 2000 Summer Olympics in Sydney, Australia, finishing 9th.

== See also ==
- Australia at the 2000 Summer Olympics
