= Mia Farrance =

Australian slalom canoeist

Mia Farrance (born 1 December 1973 in Melbourne) is an Australian slalom canoeist who competed at the international level from 1988 to 2004. She finished 14th in the K1 event at the 1996 Summer Olympics in Atlanta.

Her older brother Andrew is also a former slalom canoeist.

== World Cup individual podiums ==
Season	Date	Venue	Position	Event
2003	11 May 2003	Penrith	2nd	K1
