= Tyler Lawlor =

Canadian canoeist

Tyler Lawlor (born October 11, 1972) is a Canadian slalom canoer who competed in the late 1990s and the early 2000s. He finished ninth in the C-2 event at the 2000 Summer Olympics in Sydney.
