= Sean Boyd (water polo) =

Australian water polo player

Personal information
- Born: March 10, 1978 (age 47); Whanganui, New Zealand

Sport
- Sport: Water polo

Sean Boyd (born 10 March 1978) is an Australian water polo player who competed in the 2000 Summer Olympics.
