= Kelly Geraghty =

Australian synchronized swimmer

Personal information
- Born: July 1, 1977 (age 49) Gold Coast, Queensland, Australia

Sport
- Sport: Synchronised swimming
- Club: Oceanas SS

Kelly Geraghty (born July 11, 1977) is an Australian synchronized swimmer who competed in the 2000 Summer Olympics.
