= Melinda Cleland =

Australian gymnast

Personal information
- Nationality: Australian
- Born: 15 October 1984 (age 40); Frankston, Victoria, Australia

Sport
- Sport: Gymnastics

Melinda Cleland (born 15 October 1984) is an Australian gymnast. She competed at the 2000 Summer Olympics.
