= Russell Wentworth =

Australian volleyball player (born 1973)

Personal information
- Nationality: Australian
- Born: 7 April 1973 (age 53); St. Petersburg, Russia
- Height: 197 cm (6 ft 5 1/2 in)
- Weight: 91 kg (14.3 st; 201 lb)

National team
2000	Australia

Russell Wentworth, (born 7 April 1973) is an Australian former volleyball player. He was part of the Australia men's national volleyball team. He competed with the national team at the 2000 Summer Olympics in Sydney, Australia, finishing 8th.
