= Rayoni Head =

Australian badminton player

Personal information
- Born: Christine Rayoni Head; 18 February 1976 (age 50) Hillingdon, Greater London, England
- Height: 1.70 m (5 ft 7 in)
- Weight: 56 kg (123 lb)

Sport
- Country: Australia
- Sport: Badminton
- Event: Women's singles & doubles

Women's singles & doubles
- BWF profile
Medal record
Women's badminton
Representing Australia
Commonwealth Games
Bronze medal – third place	1998 Kuala Lumpur	Women's team
Oceania Championships
Silver medal – second place	1999 Brisbane	Women's singles
Bronze medal – third place	2002 Suva	Women's singles
Bronze medal – third place	1999 Brisbane	Women's doubles
Oceania Mixed Team Championships
Gold medal – first place	2002 Suva	Mixed team
Gold medal – first place	1999 Brisbane	Mixed team

Christine Rayoni Head (born 18 February 1976; married Rayoni Nelson) is a former Australian badminton player. She competed at the 2000 Summer Olympics in Sydney, Australia. Head played in the singles event won a match to Robbyn Hermitage of Canada in the first round, but was defeated by Chan Ya-lin of Chinese Taipei in the second round. In the doubles event she teamed-up with Kellie Lucas, the duo were defeated in the first round to Thai pair Sujitra Ekmongkolpaisarn and Saralee Thungthongkam. Head was part of the South Australian team, and represented Australia in 1998, 2002 Uber Cup, and 1998 Commonwealth Games. Head has a Bachelor of Management and a Masters in Sport Management, and work as manager, physical activity, sport and healthy eating at VicHealth.

== Achievements ==
=== Oceania Championships ===
Women's singles
Year	Venue	Opponent	Score	Result
2002	Suva, Fiji	(New Zealand) Nicole Gordon	4–7, 7–4, 3–7, 5–7	Bronze
1999	Brisbane, Australia	(New Zealand) Rhona Robertson	2–11, 5–11	Silver

Women's doubles
Year	Venue	Partner	Opponent	Score	Result
1999	Brisbane, Australia	(Australia) Kate Wilson-Smith	(New Zealand) Li Feng (New Zealand) Tammy Jenkins	3–15, 5–15	Bronze

=== IBF International ===
Women's singles
Year	Tournament	Opponent	Score	Result
2002	Altona International	(Australia) Lenny Permana	0–7, 4–7, 2–7	(silver) Runner-up
2001	Australian International	(Australia) Lenny Permana	3–7, 7–3, 3–7	(silver) Runner-up
2001	Hamilton International	(New Zealand) Rhona Robertson	4–7, 2–7, 3–7	(silver) Runner-up
2001	North Harbour International	(New Zealand) Rhona Robertson	0–7, 6–8, 8–7	(silver) Runner-up
2001	Manukau International	(New Zealand) Rhona Robertson	7–0, 4–7, 4–7	(silver) Runner-up
2000	Tasmania International	(Australia) Lenny Permana	3–11, 3–11	(silver) Runner-up
1999	Fiji International	(Australia) Kellie Lucas	11–5, 11–5	(gold) Winner
1999	Waikato International	(New Zealand) Rebecca Gordon	11–6, 8–11, 5–11	(silver) Runner-up
1998	New South Wales International	(New Zealand) Li Feng	3–11, 2–11	(silver) Runner-up
1996	South Australia International	(Australia) Jenny Gibson	9–11, 11–6, 11–6	(gold) Winner
1995	Australian International	(Australia) Lisa Campbell	1–11, 2–11	(silver) Runner-up

Women's doubles
Year	Tournament	Partner	Opponent	Score	Result
2002	Croatian International	(Australia) Jane Crabtree	(New Zealand) Tammy Jenkins (New Zealand) Rhona Robertson	4–7, 3–7, 5–7	(silver) Runner-up
2000	Tasmania International	(Australia) Kate Wilson-Smith	(Australia) Rhonda Cator (Australia) Amanda Hardy	4–15, 9–15	(silver) Runner-up
2000	Auckland International	(Australia) Kate Wilson-Smith	(New Zealand) Tammy Jenkins (New Zealand) Rhona Robertson	4–15, 1–15	(silver) Runner-up
1999	Fiji International	(Australia) Kellie Lucas	(Australia) Rhonda Cator (Australia) Amanda Hardy	3–15, 2–15	(silver) Runner-up
1999	Wellington International	(Australia) Kate Wilson-Smith	(New Zealand) Tammy Jenkins (New Zealand) Rhona Robertson	6–15, 2–15	(silver) Runner-up
1997	Victoria International	(Australia) Katrina Mirkovic	(Australia) Lisa Campbell (Australia) Michaela Smith	5–15, 5–15	(silver) Runner-up
1996	South Australia International	(Australia) Dawn Chambers	(Australia) Jenny Gibson (Australia) Lynda Graves	7–15, 3–15	(silver) Runner-up
