= José Luis Salema =

Argentinian beach volleyballer

Personal information
- Full name: José Luis Salema Abrantes
- Born: 19 May 1970 (age 56); Buenos Aires, Argentina
- Height: 190 cm (6 ft 3 in)

José Luis Salema Abrantes (born on 19 May 1970), is an Argentinian former beach volleyballer.

== Biography ==
José Luis Salema was born in Buenos Aires on 19 May 1970.

=== Early career ===
Salema made his FIVB World Tour debut in 1995 with Hernan Rojas. The following year, he formed a duo with Mariano Baracetti with whom he would play through 2000. The pair took part in twelve FIVB tournaments in their first season with a seventh place in Lignano as their best result. The following year, they achieved seven top ten places in nine regular competitions; in Lignano and Espinho they finished fifth. In addition, Salema and Baracetti competed in the first official Beach Volleyball World Championships in Los Angeles, where they were eliminated in the first round by Americans Eric Fonoimoana and Brian Lewis. In 1998, the duo made the top ten in six of the thirteen tournaments; in Vitória, the pair also finished third on the podium.

The following season they achieved two top ten places in thirteen games. They finished seventh in Lignano and ninth at the World Championships in Marseille. Baracetti and Salema lost in Marseille in the third round to the Brazilian duo Emanuel Rego and José Loiola, after which they were definitively eliminated in the fourth second chance round by the American pair Robert Heidger and Kevin Wong. The duo started in 2000 with a victory in Mar del Plata and only reached the semifinals in Chicago in the remainder of the season.

=== Olympic career ===
At the 2000 Summer Olympics in Sydney, Russians Mikhail Kushneryov and Sergey Yermishin and Australians Matthew Grinlaubs and Joshua Slack were too strong in the first round and in the repechage respectively, leaving Salema and Baracetti in 19th place.

=== Further career ===
After the Games, Salema formed a duo with Eduardo Esteban Martínez. The pair took part in eight tournaments in 2001, including the World Championship in Klagenfurt; Salema and Martínez reached the sixteenth final where they were eliminated by the Germans Markus Dieckmann and Jonas Reckermann. The same year, Salema also played a match with Pedro Depiaggio. The following season, he competed with Pablo del Coto in two tournaments, after which he took a two-year break from beach volleyball. In 2005 Salema returned to the side of Martín Conde. They participated in nine regular FIVB tournaments and achieved three top ten places; in Shanghai the duo finished fifth, in Saint Petersburgseventh and in Zagreb ninth. In addition, they were active at the World Cup in Berlin. Salema and Conde lost in the fourth round to the Cuban duo Francisco Álvarez Cutiño and Oney Ramirez Bernal, after which they had to give up in the sixth repechage round against the later Brazilian world champions Márcio Araújo and Fábio Luiz Magalhães due to an injury.

The following season, Salema participated with Depiaggio in four tournaments in the World Tour. He then again took a break from playing, after which he formed a duo with Baracetti again from 2008 to 2009. They took part in fourteen tournaments in the World Tour in the first year with a third place in Sanya as the best result. The following year, Salema and Baracetti were eliminated in the group stage at the World Championships in Stavanger and in Stare Jabłonki both played their last game in the World Tour.
