= Priscilla Ruddle =

Australian volleyball player (born 1976)

Personal information
- Nationality: Australian
- Born: 12 July 1976 (age 50)
- Height: 1.83 m (6 ft 0 in)
- Weight: 85 kg (187 lb)

National team
2000	Australia

Priscilla Ruddle (born 12 July 1976) is a former Australian female volleyball player. She was part of the Australia women's national volleyball team.

She competed with the national team at the 2000 Summer Olympics in Sydney, Australia, finishing 9th. She participated in the 2002 FIVB Volleyball Women's World Championship.

== See also ==
- Australia at the 2000 Summer Olympics
