= Cathryn Wightman =

Australian synchronized swimmer

Personal information
- Born: 8 July 1978 (age 48) Melbourne, Australia

Sport
- Sport: Synchronised swimming

Cathryn Wightman (born 8 July 1978) is an Australian synchronized swimmer who competed in the 2000 Summer Olympics.
