= Rachel White (volleyball) =

Australian volleyball player (born 1974)

Personal information
- Nationality: Australian
- Born: 30 October 1974 (age 52); Oxford, United Kingdom
- Hometown: Emmedale
- Height: 1.8 m (5 ft 11 in)
- Weight: 76 kg (168 lb)

National team
2000	Australia

Rachel White (born 30 October 1974 in Oxford, United Kingdom) is a former Australian female volleyball player. She was part of the Australia women's national volleyball team. She competed with the national team at the 2000 Summer Olympics in Sydney, Australia, finishing 9th.

== See also ==
- Australia at the 2000 Summer Olympics
