= Rio Suryana =

Indonesian-born Australian badminton player

Personal information
- Born: 28 February 1977 (age 49) Bogor, West Java, Indonesia
- Height: 1.75 m (5 ft 9 in)
- Weight: 64 kg (141 lb)

Sport
- Country: Australia
- Sport: Badminton
- Handedness: Right
- Event: Men's singles & doubles

Men's singles & doubles
- BWF profile
Medal record
Men's badminton
Representing Australia
Oceania Championships
Gold medal – first place	1999 Brisbane	Men's singles
Oceania Mixed Team Championships
Gold medal – first place	1999 Brisbane	Mixed team

Rio Suryana (born 28 February 1977) is an Indonesian born, Australian badminton player. Suryana was the champion of the Oceania Championships in 1999. He competed at the 2000 Summer Olympics in Sydney in the men's singles and mixed doubles event.

== Achievements ==
=== Oceania Championships ===
Men's singles
Year	Venue	Opponent	Score	Result
1999	Sleeman Sports Complex; Brisbane, Australia	(New Zealand) Geoffrey Bellingham	15–5, 10–15, 15–6	Gold

=== IBF Grand Prix ===
Men's singles
Year	Tournament	Opponent	Score	Result
1999	Polish Open	(Wales) Richard Vaughan	15–9, 6–15, 15–12	(gold) Winner

=== IBF International ===
Men's singles
Year	Tournament	Opponent	Score	Result
2000	Victoria International	(China) Dong Jiong	9–15, 3–15	(silver) Runner-up
2000	Australia Capital International	(Hong Kong) Ng Wei	15–11, 3–15, 7–15	(silver) Runner-up
2000	Waitakere International	(South Korea) Lee Hyun-il	8–15, 0–15	(silver) Runner-up
1999	Wellington International	(India) Sachin Ratti	15–5, 4–15, 10–15	(silver) Runner-up
1999	Australian International	(India) Abhinn Shyam Gupta	15–6, 15–6	(gold) Winner
1998	Australian International	(Australia) Stuart Brehaut	15–12, 15–7	(gold) Winner
