= Kasey Giteau =

Australian swimmer

Personal information
- Nickname: Kasey Giteau
- National team: Australia
- Born: 20 September 1982 (age 43) Sydney, New South Wales
- Height: 1.87 m (6 ft 2 in)
- Weight: 80 kg (180 lb)

Sport
- Sport: Swimming
- Strokes: Freestyle
- Club: Toongabbie Swim Club

Kasey Giteau (born 20 September 1982) is a former competitive swimmer who represented Australia at the 2000 Summer Olympics in Sydney, Australia. There she finished in 18th position in the 400-metre freestyle, clocking 4:15.54 in the qualifying heats.
