= Andrew Farrance =

Australian slalom canoeist

Andrew Farrance (born 14 September 1972 in Melbourne) is an Australian slalom canoeist who competed from the early 1990s to the mid-2000s. He finished 11th in the C2 event at the 2000 Summer Olympics in Sydney.

His younger sister Mia is also a former slalom canoeist.
