= Stuart Bowman (canoeist) =

British slalom canoeist (born 1975)

Stuart Bowman (born 13 February 1975 in London) is a British slalom canoeist who competed from the late 1990s to the mid-2000s.

Competing in two Summer Olympics, he earned his best finish of fourth in the C2 event in Sydney in 2000.

His partner in the C2 boat throughout the whole of his career was Nick Smith.

== World Cup individual podiums ==
Season	Date	Venue	Position	Event
2000	9 July 2000	La Seu d'Urgell	3rd	C2
2003	11 May 2003	Penrith	2nd	C2
2003	6 July 2003	La Seu d'Urgell	3rd	C2
2006	3 June 2006	Augsburg	3rd	C2
