= List of ICF Canoe Slalom World Championships medalists in men's canoe =

This is a list of medalists from the ICF Canoe Slalom World Championships in men's canoe.

== C1 ==
Debuted: 1949.

Championships	Gold	Silver	Bronze
1949 Geneva	Pierre d'Alençon (FRA)	Paul Huguet (FRA)	Jan Brzák-Felix (TCH)
1951 Steyr	Charles Dussuet (SUI)	Jaroslav Váňa (TCH)	Jacques Marsigny (FRA)
1953 Meran	Charles Dussuet (SUI)	Václav Nič (TCH)	Vladimír Jirásek (TCH)
1955 Tacen	Vladimír Jirásek (TCH)	Luděk Beneš (TCH)	Karl-Heinz Wozniak (GDR)
1957 Augsburg	Manfred Schubert (GDR)	Emil Zimmermann (GDR)	Jean-Claude Tochon (SUI)
1959 Geneva	Vladimír Jirásek (TCH)	Manfred Schubert (GDR)	Karl-Heinz Wozniak (GDR)
1961 Hainsberg	Manfred Schubert (GDR)	Bohuslav Pospíchal (TCH)	Ingo Kirsch (GDR)
1963 Spittal	Manfred Schubert (GDR)	Gert Kleinert (GDR)	Jean-Claude Tochon (SUI)
1965 Spittal	Gert Kleinert (GDR)	Luděk Beneš (TCH)	Manfred Schubert (GDR)
1967 Lipno	Wolfgang Peters (FRG)	Harald Cuypers (FRG)	Karel Kumpfmüller (TCH)
1969 Bourg St.-Maurice	Wolfgang Peters (FRG)	Reinhold Kauder (FRG)	Zbyněk Puleč (TCH)
1971 Meran	Reinhold Kauder (FRG)	Wulf Reinicke (GDR)	Petr Sodomka (TCH)
1973 Muotathal	Reinhard Eiben (GDR)	Karel Třešňák (TCH)	Udo Müller (GDR)
1975 Skopje	Petr Sodomka (TCH)	Jaroslav Radil (TCH)	Harald Heinrich (GDR)
1977 Spittal	Petr Sodomka (TCH)	Peter Massalski (GDR)	Karel Třešňák (TCH)
1979 Jonquière	Jon Lugbill (USA)	David Hearn (USA)	Bob Robison (USA)
1981 Bala	Jon Lugbill (USA)	David Hearn (USA)	Jean Sennelier (FRA)
1983 Meran	Jon Lugbill (USA)	David Hearn (USA)	Jože Vidmar (YUG)
1985 Augsburg	David Hearn (USA)	Jon Lugbill (USA)	Martyn Hedges (GBR)
1987 Bourg St.-Maurice	Jon Lugbill (USA)	David Hearn (USA)	Bruce Lessels (USA)
1989 Savage River	Jon Lugbill (USA)	David Hearn (USA)	Thierry Humeau (FRA)
1991 Tacen	Martin Lang (GER)	Adam Clawson (USA)	Jacky Avril (FRA)
1993 Mezzana	Martin Lang (GER)	Hervé Delamarre (FRA)	Sören Kaufmann (GER)
1995 Nottingham	David Hearn (USA)	Sören Kaufmann (GER)	Michal Martikán (SVK)
1997 Três Coroas	Michal Martikán (SVK)	Lukáš Pollert (CZE)	Gareth Marriott (GBR)
1999 La Seu d'Urgell	Emmanuel Brugvin (FRA)	Robin Bell (AUS)	Michal Martikán (SVK)
2002 Bourg St.-Maurice	Michal Martikán (SVK)	Jan Benzien (GER)	Patrice Estanguet (FRA)
2003 Augsburg	Michal Martikán (SVK)	Tony Estanguet (FRA)	Stefan Pfannmöller (GER)
2005 Penrith	Robin Bell (AUS)	Tony Estanguet (FRA)	Michal Martikán (SVK)
2006 Prague	Tony Estanguet (FRA)	Michal Martikán (SVK)	Stanislav Ježek (CZE)
2007 Foz do Iguaçu	Michal Martikán (SVK)	Tony Estanguet (FRA)	Robin Bell (AUS)
2009 La Seu d'Urgell	Tony Estanguet (FRA)	Michal Martikán (SVK)	Jan Benzien (GER)
2010 Tacen	Tony Estanguet (FRA)	Michal Martikán (SVK)	Jordi Domenjó (ESP)
2011 Bratislava	Denis Gargaud Chanut (FRA)	Nico Bettge (GER)	Matej Beňuš (SVK)
2013 Prague	David Florence (GBR)	Alexander Slafkovský (SVK)	Benjamin Savšek (SLO)
2014 Deep Creek Lake	Fabien Lefèvre (USA)	Benjamin Savšek (SLO)	Franz Anton (GER)
2015 London	David Florence (GBR)	Benjamin Savšek (SLO)	Ryan Westley (GBR)
2017 Pau	Benjamin Savšek (SLO)	Alexander Slafkovský (SVK)	Michal Martikán (SVK)
2018 Rio de Janeiro	Franz Anton (GER)	Ryan Westley (GBR)	Sideris Tasiadis (GER)
2019 La Seu d'Urgell	Cédric Joly (FRA)	Ander Elosegi (ESP)	Luka Božič (SLO)
2021 Bratislava	Václav Chaloupka (CZE)	Alexander Slafkovský (SVK)	Franz Anton (GER)
2022 Augsburg	Sideris Tasiadis (GER)	Alexander Slafkovský (SVK)	Franz Anton (GER)
2023 London	Benjamin Savšek (SLO)	Nicolas Gestin (FRA)	Paolo Ceccon (ITA)
2025 Penrith	Nicolas Gestin (FRA)	Ryan Westley (GBR)	Kaylen Bassett (AUS)
2026 Oklahoma City	Miquel Travé (ESP)	Adam Burgess (GBR)	Lukáš Kratochvíl (CZE)

- Medal table

Rank	Nation	Gold	Silver	Bronze	Total
1	United States (USA)	8	7	2	17
2	France (FRA)	8	6	5	19
3	East Germany	5	5	6	16
4	Czechoslovakia	4	7	6	17
5	Slovakia (SVK)	4	7	5	16
6	Germany (GER)	4	3	7	14
7	West Germany	3	2	0	5
8	Great Britain (GBR)	2	3	3	8
9	Slovenia (SLO)	2	2	2	6
10	Switzerland (SUI)	2	0	2	4
11	Australia (AUS)	1	1	2	4
11	Czech Republic (CZE)	1	1	2	4
13	Spain (ESP)	1	1	1	3
14	Italy (ITA)	0	0	1	1
14	Yugoslavia	0	0	1	1
Totals (15 entries)		45	45	45	135

== C1 team ==
Debuted: 1949.

Championships	Gold	Silver	Bronze
1949 Geneva	France; Pierre d'Alençon; Paul Huguet; Marcel Renaud	Czechoslovakia; Jan Brzák-Felix; Jiří Purchart; Bohuslav Karlík	–
1951 Steyr	Czechoslovakia; Václav Nič; Jaroslav Váňa; Jan Pecka	France; Jacques Marsigny; Roger Paris; Pierre Biehler	–
1953 Meran	Czechoslovakia; Vladimír Jirásek; Jan Šulc; Stanislav Jánský	Switzerland; Jean-Paul Rössinger; Roland Bardet; Charles Dussuet	France; Jacques Marsigny; Jacques Velard; Pierre Biehler
1955 Tacen	Czechoslovakia; Vladimír Jirásek; Jiří Hradil; Luděk Beneš	East Germany; Karl-Heinz Wozniak; Dieter Fritzsche; Manfred Schubert	Switzerland; Roland Bardet; Jean-Claude Tochon; Robert Inhelder
1957 Augsburg	West Germany; Günther Beck; Heiner Stumpf; Otto Stumpf	East Germany; Emil Zimmermann; Gert Kleinert; Manfred Schubert	Czechoslovakia; Luděk Beneš; Jiří Hradil; Vladimír Jirásek
1959 Geneva	Czechoslovakia; Luděk Beneš; Václav Janovský; Vladimír Jirásek	East Germany; Manfred Schubert; Karl-Heinz Wozniak; Gert Kleinert	Switzerland; Jean-Claude Tochon; Marcel Roth; Roland Bardet
1961 Hainsberg	Czechoslovakia; Tibor Sýkora; Jaroslav Pollert; Bohuslav Pospíchal	East Germany; Karl-Heinz Wozniak; Manfred Schubert; Gert Kleinert	Switzerland; Jean-Claude Tochon; Michel Weber; Marcel Roth
1963 Spittal	East Germany; Karl-Heinz Wozniak; Gert Kleinert; Manfred Schubert	West Germany; Norbert Schmidt; Heiner Stumpf; Otto Stumpf	Switzerland; Jean-Claude Tochon; Heinz Grobat; Marcel Roth
1965 Spittal	Czechoslovakia; Jiří Vočka; Luděk Beneš; Bohuslav Pospíchal	West Germany; Christian Kaufmann; Heiner Stumpf; Otto Stumpf	East Germany; Jochen Förster; Gert Kleinert; Manfred Schubert
1967 Lipno	Czechoslovakia; Petr Sodomka; Karel Kumpfmüller; Bohuslav Pospíchal	East Germany; Jochen Förster; Manfred Schubert; Jürgen Köhler	West Germany; Harald Cuypers; Wolfgang Peters; Otto Stumpf
1969 Bourg St.-Maurice	West Germany; Wolfgang Peters; Harald Cuypers; Reinhold Kauder	Czechoslovakia; František Kadaňka; Zbyněk Puleč; Petr Sodomka	France; Claude Baux; François Bonnet; Michel Trenchant
1971 Meran	East Germany; Jürgen Köhler; Wulf Reinicke; Jochen Förster	West Germany; Wolfgang Peters; Harald Cuypers; Reinhold Kauder	Czechoslovakia; Zbyněk Puleč; Karel Třešňák; Petr Sodomka
1973 Muotathal	Czechoslovakia; Karel Třešňák; Petr Sodomka; Jaroslav Radil	East Germany; Reinhard Eiben; Peter Massalski; Udo Müller	West Germany; Walter Horn; Wolfgang Peters; Josef Schumacher
1975 Skopje	Czechoslovakia; Petr Sodomka; Jaroslav Radil; Karel Třešňák	East Germany; Reinhard Eiben; Peter Massalski; Harald Heinrich	West Germany; Walter Horn; Dietmar Moos; Dieter Remmlinger
1977 Spittal	East Germany; Reinhard Eiben; Peter Massalski; Lutz Körner	West Germany; Dietmar Moos; Ernst Libuda; Walter Horn	Czechoslovakia; Jaroslav Radil; Karel Třešňák; Petr Sodomka
1979 Jonquière	United States; Jon Lugbill; David Hearn; Bob Robison	West Germany; Jürgen Schnitzerling; Walter Horn; Udo Werner	Czechoslovakia; Milan Gába; Karel Třešňák; Karel Ťoupalík
1981 Bala	United States; Jon Lugbill; David Hearn; Ron Lugbill	France; Hervé Madore; Jean Sennelier; Jean Salamé	West Germany; Gerald Moos; Fredi Zimmermann; Jürgen Schnitzerling
1983 Meran	United States; Jon Lugbill; David Hearn; Kent Ford	Czechoslovakia; Juraj Ontko; Jozef Hajdučík; Karel Ťoupalík	Great Britain; Martyn Hedges; Peter Keane; Jeremy Taylor
1985 Augsburg	United States; David Hearn; Jon Lugbill; Kent Ford	West Germany; Gerald Moos; Andreas Kübler; Ulrich Weber	Poland; Edward Florian; Piotr Sarata; Adam Pietrasik
1987 Bourg St.-Maurice	United States; Jon Lugbill; David Hearn; Bruce Lessels	France; Jean Sennelier; Thierry Humeau; Jacky Avril	Czechoslovakia; Juraj Ontko; Jozef Hajdučík; Jaroslav Slúčik
1989 Savage River	United States; Jon Lugbill; David Hearn; Jed Prentice	France; Thierry Humeau; Jacky Avril; Thierry Lepeltier	Yugoslavia; Borut Javornik; Jože Vidmar; Boštjan Žitnik
1991 Tacen	United States; Adam Clawson; Jon Lugbill; Jed Prentice	France; Jacky Avril; Hervé Delamarre; Emmanuel Brugvin	Great Britain; Mark Delaney; Bill Horsman; Gareth Marriott
1993 Mezzana	Slovenia; Jože Vidmar; Boštjan Žitnik; Simon Hočevar	Great Britain; Bill Horsman; Gareth Marriott; Mark Delaney	Italy; Francesco Stefani; Luca Della Libera; Renato de Monti
1995 Nottingham	Germany; Vitus Husek; Sören Kaufmann; Martin Lang	Croatia; Danko Herceg; Zlatko Sedlar; Stjepan Perestegi	Slovakia; Michal Martikán; Juraj Minčík; Juraj Ontko
1997 Três Coroas	Slovakia; Michal Martikán; Juraj Minčík; Juraj Ontko	France; Patrice Estanguet; Tony Estanguet; Yves Narduzzi	Slovenia; Simon Hočevar; Gregor Terdič; Sebastjan Linke
1999 La Seu d'Urgell	Poland; Krzysztof Bieryt; Sławomir Mordarski; Mariusz Wieczorek	Germany; Stefan Pfannmöller; Nico Bettge; Martin Lang	France; Patrice Estanguet; Emmanuel Brugvin; Tony Estanguet
2002 Bourg St.-Maurice	Czech Republic; Přemysl Vlk; Jan Mašek; Stanislav Ježek	Germany; Sören Kaufmann; Jan Benzien; Stefan Pfannmöller	Slovenia; Jurij Korenjak; Dejan Stevanovič; Simon Hočevar
2003 Augsburg	Slovakia; Alexander Slafkovský; Juraj Minčík; Michal Martikán	France; Tony Estanguet; Emmanuel Brugvin; Patrice Estanguet	Czech Republic; Tomáš Indruch; Jan Mašek; Stanislav Ježek
2005 Penrith	France; Olivier Lalliet; Pierre Labarelle; Tony Estanguet	Germany; Nico Bettge; Stefan Pfannmöller; Jan Benzien	Czech Republic; Tomáš Indruch; Jan Mašek; Stanislav Ježek
2006 Prague	Germany; Stefan Pfannmöller; Nico Bettge; Jan Benzien	Czech Republic; Tomáš Indruch; Jan Mašek; Stanislav Ježek	Great Britain; David Florence; Stuart McIntosh; Daniel Goodard
2007 Foz do Iguaçu	France; Tony Estanguet; Pierre Labarelle; Nicolas Peschier	Germany; Jan Benzien; Nico Bettge; Lukas Hoffmann	Czech Republic; Stanislav Ježek; Tomáš Indruch; Jan Mašek
2009 La Seu d'Urgell	Slovakia; Alexander Slafkovský; Michal Martikán; Matej Beňuš	France; Nicolas Peschier; Denis Gargaud Chanut; Tony Estanguet	Spain; Jordi Domenjó; Jon Ergüín; Ander Elosegi
2010 Tacen	Slovakia; Michal Martikán; Alexander Slafkovský; Matej Beňuš	Germany; Sideris Tasiadis; Jan Benzien; Franz Anton	Czech Republic; Stanislav Ježek; Jan Mašek; Michal Jáně
2011 Bratislava	Slovakia; Michal Martikán; Alexander Slafkovský; Matej Beňuš	Germany; Sideris Tasiadis; Nico Bettge; Jan Benzien	Czech Republic; Stanislav Ježek; Vítězslav Gebas; Tomáš Indruch
2013 Prague	Slovakia; Michal Martikán; Alexander Slafkovský; Matej Beňuš	Germany; Sideris Tasiadis; Jan Benzien; Franz Anton	France; Denis Gargaud Chanut; Jonathan Marc; Nicolas Peschier
2014 Deep Creek Lake	Slovakia; Michal Martikán; Alexander Slafkovský; Matej Beňuš	Czech Republic; Michal Jáně; Vítězslav Gebas; Jan Mašek	Slovenia; Benjamin Savšek; Luka Božič; Anže Berčič
2015 London	Slovakia; Michal Martikán; Alexander Slafkovský; Matej Beňuš	Germany; Sideris Tasiadis; Nico Bettge; Franz Anton	Slovenia; Benjamin Savšek; Luka Božič; Jure Lenarčič
2017 Pau	Slovakia; Matej Beňuš; Alexander Slafkovský; Michal Martikán	Great Britain; Ryan Westley; David Florence; Adam Burgess	France; Denis Gargaud Chanut; Martin Thomas; Edern Le Ruyet
2018 Rio de Janeiro	Slovakia; Alexander Slafkovský; Michal Martikán; Matej Beňuš	Slovenia; Benjamin Savšek; Luka Božič; Anže Berčič	Great Britain; David Florence; Ryan Westley; Adam Burgess
2019 La Seu d'Urgell	Slovakia; Alexander Slafkovský; Michal Martikán; Matej Beňuš	Spain; Ander Elosegi; Miquel Travé; Luis Fernández	Russia; Kirill Setkin; Dmitrii Khramtsov; Pavel Kotov
2021 Bratislava	France; Martin Thomas; Denis Gargaud Chanut; Nicolas Gestin	Czech Republic; Lukáš Rohan; Václav Chaloupka; Vojtěch Heger	Slovakia; Matej Beňuš; Marko Mirgorodský; Alexander Slafkovský
2022 Augsburg	Slovenia; Benjamin Savšek; Luka Božič; Anže Berčič	Slovakia; Matej Beňuš; Marko Mirgorodský; Alexander Slafkovský	Italy; Roberto Colazingari; Raffaello Ivaldi; Paolo Ceccon
2023 London	France; Nicolas Gestin; Jules Bernardet; Lucas Roisin	Great Britain; Adam Burgess; Ryan Westley; James Kettle	Italy; Roberto Colazingari; Raffaello Ivaldi; Paolo Ceccon
2025 Penrith	France; Nicolas Gestin; Mewen Debliquy; Yohann Senechault	Great Britain; Adam Burgess; Ryan Westley; Luc Royle	Slovenia; Benjamin Savšek; Luka Božič; Žiga Lin Hočevar
2026 Oklahoma City	Great Britain; Ryan Westley; Adam Burgess; Peter Linksted	France; Nicolas Gestin; Yohann Senechault; Jules Bernardet	Germany; Lennard Tuchscherer; Timo Trummer; Sideris Tasiadis

- Medal table

Rank	Nation	Gold	Silver	Bronze	Total
1	Slovakia (SVK)	11	1	2	14
2	Czechoslovakia	9	3	5	17
3	United States (USA)	7	0	0	7
4	France (FRA)	6	9	5	20
5	East Germany	3	7	1	11
6	Germany (GER)	2	8	1	11
7	West Germany	2	6	4	12
8	Slovenia (SLO)	2	1	5	8
9	Great Britain (GBR)	1	4	4	9
10	Czech Republic (CZE)	1	3	5	9
11	Poland (POL)	1	0	1	2
12	Switzerland (SUI)	0	1	4	5
13	Spain (ESP)	0	1	1	2
14	Croatia (CRO)	0	1	0	1
15	Italy (ITA)	0	0	3	3
16	Russia (RUS)	0	0	1	1
16	Yugoslavia	0	0	1	1
Totals (17 entries)		45	45	43	133

== C2 ==
Debuted: 1949. Discontinued: 2017.

Championships	Gold	Silver	Bronze
1949 Geneva	France; Michel Duboille; Jacques Rousseau	France; Claude Neveu; Roger Paris	Czechoslovakia; Jan Brzák-Felix; Bohumil Kudrna
1951 Steyr	France; Claude Neveu; Roger Paris	France; Jacques Musson; André Pean	Czechoslovakia; Václav Havel; Jiří Pecka
1953 Meran	Switzerland; Charles Dussuet; Jean Engler	Czechoslovakia; Václav Nič; Jan Šulc	France; Pierre d'Alençon; Jean-Luc Houssaye
1955 Tacen	France; Claude Neveu; Roger Paris	East Germany; Dieter Friedrich; Horst Kleinert	Czechoslovakia; František Hrabě; Jiří Kotana
1957 Augsburg	East Germany; Dieter Friedrich; Horst Kleinert	Czechoslovakia; Václav Havel; Josef Hendrych	Czechoslovakia; František Hrabě; Jiří Kotana
1959 Geneva	East Germany; Dieter Friedrich; Horst Kleinert	Czechoslovakia; Václav Havel; Josef Hendrych	East Germany; Dieter Göthe; Lothar Schubert
1961 Hainsberg	East Germany; Günther Merkel; Manfred Merkel	Czechoslovakia; Miroslav Stach; Zdeněk Valenta	East Germany; Dieter Friedrich; Horst Kleinert
1963 Spittal	East Germany; Günther Merkel; Manfred Merkel	Yugoslavia; Natan Bernot; Dare Bernot	East Germany; Siegfried Lück; Jürgen Noak
1965 Spittal	East Germany; Günther Merkel; Manfred Merkel	Czechoslovakia; Jiří Dejl; Zdeněk Fifka	Switzerland; Fernand Götz; Wolfgang Klingebiel
1967 Lipno	Czechoslovakia; Miroslav Stach; Zdeněk Valenta	Czechoslovakia; Gabriel Janoušek; Milan Horyna	Czechoslovakia; Ladislav Měšťan; Zdeněk Měšťan
1969 Bourg St.-Maurice	France; Jean-Claude Olry; Jean-Louis Olry	Czechoslovakia; Ladislav Měšťan; Zdeněk Měšťan	Czechoslovakia; Miroslav Stach; Zdeněk Valenta
1971 Meran	East Germany; Klaus Trummer; Jürgen Kretschmer	East Germany; Rolf-Dieter Amend; Walter Hofmann	East Germany; Uwe Franz; Ulrich Opelt
1973 Muotathal	Czechoslovakia; Jiří Krejza; Jaroslav Pollert	East Germany; Klaus Trummer; Jürgen Kretschmer	West Germany; Wilhelm Baues; Hans-Otto Schumacher
1975 Skopje	East Germany; Klaus Trummer; Jürgen Kretschmer	Poland; Wojciech Kudlik; Jerzy Jeż	Czechoslovakia; Antonín Brabec; František Kadaňka
1977 Spittal	East Germany; Walter Hofmann; Jürgen Kalbitz	Czechoslovakia; Miroslav Nedvěd; Pavel Schwarc	East Germany; Michael Berek; Frank Kretschmer
1979 Jonquière	West Germany; Dieter Welsink; Peter Czupryna	France; Pierre Calori; Jacques Calori	Poland; Wojciech Kudlik; Jerzy Jeż
1981 Bala	United States; Steve Garvis; Mike Garvis	West Germany; Dieter Welsink; Peter Czupryna	United States; Paul Grabow; Jefry Huey
1983 Meran	United States; Lecky Haller; Fritz Haller	France; Pierre Calori; Jacques Calori	United States; Steve Garvis; Mike Garvis
1985 Augsburg	West Germany; Thomas Klein-Impelmann; Stephan Küppers	France; Pierre Calori; Jacques Calori	West Germany; Günther Wolkenaer; Fredi Zimmermann
1987 Bourg St.-Maurice	France; Pierre Calori; Jacques Calori	United States; Lecky Haller; Jamie McEwan	Czechoslovakia; Milan Kučera; Miroslav Hajdučík
1989 Savage River	West Germany; Frank Hemmer; Thomas Loose	Czechoslovakia; Jan Petříček; Tomáš Petříček	France; Emmanuel del Rey; Thierry Saidi
1991 Tacen	France; Frank Adisson; Wilfrid Forgues	Czechoslovakia; Jiří Rohan; Miroslav Šimek	France; Emmanuel del Rey; Thierry Saidi
1993 Mezzana	Czech Republic; Jiří Rohan; Miroslav Šimek	France; Éric Biau; Bertrand Daille	France; Frank Adisson; Wilfrid Forgues
1995 Nottingham	Poland; Krzysztof Kołomański; Michał Staniszewski	France; Frank Adisson; Wilfrid Forgues	France; Éric Biau; Bertrand Daille
1997 Três Coroas	France; Frank Adisson; Wilfrid Forgues	Germany; Michael Senft; André Ehrenberg	Czech Republic; Jiří Rohan; Miroslav Šimek
1999 La Seu d'Urgell	Czech Republic; Marek Jiras; Tomáš Máder	Poland; Krzysztof Kołomański; Michał Staniszewski	France; Éric Biau; Bertrand Daille
2002 Bourg St.-Maurice	Slovakia; Pavol Hochschorner; Peter Hochschorner	France; Pierre Luquet; Christophe Luquet	Czech Republic; Marek Jiras; Tomáš Máder
2003 Augsburg	Germany; Marcus Becker; Stefan Henze	Czech Republic; Jaroslav Volf; Ondřej Štěpánek	Slovakia; Pavol Hochschorner; Peter Hochschorner
2005 Penrith	Germany; Christian Bahmann; Michael Senft	Slovakia; Milan Kubáň; Marián Olejník	Germany; Marcus Becker; Stefan Henze
2006 Prague	Czech Republic; Jaroslav Volf; Ondřej Štěpánek	Germany; Marcus Becker; Stefan Henze	Slovakia; Pavol Hochschorner; Peter Hochschorner
2007 Foz do Iguaçu	Slovakia; Pavol Hochschorner; Peter Hochschorner	France; Pierre Luquet; Christophe Luquet	Italy; Andrea Benetti; Erik Masoero
2009 La Seu d'Urgell	Slovakia; Pavol Hochschorner; Peter Hochschorner	Slovakia; Ladislav Škantár; Peter Škantár	Slovenia; Luka Božič; Sašo Taljat
2010 Tacen	Slovakia; Pavol Hochschorner; Peter Hochschorner	France; Denis Gargaud Chanut; Fabien Lefèvre	Great Britain; David Florence; Richard Hounslow
2011 Bratislava	Slovakia; Pavol Hochschorner; Peter Hochschorner	France; Denis Gargaud Chanut; Fabien Lefèvre	Slovakia; Ladislav Škantár; Peter Škantár
2013 Prague	Great Britain; David Florence; Richard Hounslow	Czech Republic; Jaroslav Volf; Ondřej Štěpánek	Slovakia; Ladislav Škantár; Peter Škantár
2014 Deep Creek Lake	Slovenia; Luka Božič; Sašo Taljat	France; Pierre Picco; Hugo Biso	Slovakia; Ladislav Škantár; Peter Škantár
2015 London	Germany; Franz Anton; Jan Benzien	France; Pierre Picco; Hugo Biso	France; Gauthier Klauss; Matthieu Péché
2017 Pau	France; Gauthier Klauss; Matthieu Péché	Slovakia; Ladislav Škantár; Peter Škantár	Germany; Robert Behling; Thomas Becker

- Medal table

Rank	Nation	Gold	Silver	Bronze	Total
1	France (FRA)	8	13	7	28
2	East Germany	8	3	5	16
3	Slovakia (SVK)	5	3	5	13
4	Czech Republic (CZE)	3	2	2	7
4	Germany (GER)	3	2	2	7
6	West Germany	3	1	2	6
7	Czechoslovakia	2	10	8	20
8	United States (USA)	2	1	2	5
9	Poland (POL)	1	2	1	4
10	Great Britain (GBR)	1	0	1	2
10	Slovenia (SLO)	1	0	1	2
10	Switzerland (SUI)	1	0	1	2
13	Yugoslavia	0	1	0	1
14	Italy (ITA)	0	0	1	1
Totals (14 entries)		38	38	38	114

== C2 team ==
Debuted: 1949. Discontinued: 2017. Not counted as a medal event due to insufficient number of participating countries in 2005 and 2017.

Championships	Gold	Silver	Bronze
1949 Geneva	France; Michel Duboille & Jacques Rousseau; Claude Neveu & Roger Paris; René Gavinet & Simon Gavinet	Czechoslovakia; Jan Brzák-Felix & Bohumil Kudrna; Václav Nič & Miroslav Drastík; Jan Šulc & Karel Koníček	–
1951 Steyr	France; Pierre d'Alençon & Jean Dreux; Jacques Musson & André Pean; Claude Neveu & Roger Paris	Czechoslovakia; Václav Nič & Jan Šulc; Bohuslav Fiala & Bohumil Berdych; Václav Havel & Jiří Pecka	Switzerland; Charles Dussuet & Deglise Melle; Pierre Dufour & R. Esseiva; Jean-Paul Rössinger & R. Junod
1953 Meran	France; René Gavinet & Simon Gavinet; Claude Neveu & Roger Paris; Pierre d'Alençon & Jean-Luc Houssaye	Switzerland; Jean-Paul Rössinger & R. Junod; Pierre Rössinger & Pierre Dufour; Charles Dussuet & Jean Engler	Czechoslovakia; Josef Hendrych & Jiří Hradil; Václav Havel & Jiří Pecka; Miroslav Čihák & Jan Pecka
1955 Tacen	Czechoslovakia; František Hrabě & Jiří Kotana; Vladimír Lánský & Josef Hendrych; Rudolf Flégr & Milan Řehoř	East Germany; Dieter Friedrich & Horst Kleinert; Dieter Göthe & Helmut Weise; Franz Brendel & Günter Grosswig	Austria; Wolfram Steinwendtner & Bruno Kerbl; Harry Jarosch & Eduard Haider; Alfred Falkner & Richard Schauer
1957 Augsburg	Czechoslovakia; Rudolf Flégr & Milan Řehoř; Václav Havel & Josef Hendrych; František Hrabě & Jiří Kotana	Switzerland; Charles Dussuet & Henri Kadrnka; Jean Pessina & Robert Zürcher; Jean-Paul Rössinger & Roger Tauss	East Germany; Franz Brendel & Günter Grosswig; Dieter Friedrich & Horst Kleinert; Dieter Göthe & Lothar Schubert
1959 Geneva	East Germany; Dieter Friedrich & Horst Kleinert; Dieter Göthe & Lothar Schubert; Manfred Glöckner & Rudolf Seifert	Czechoslovakia; Miroslav Čihák & Vladimír Lánský; Václav Havel & Josef Hendrych; Milan Horyna & Milan Kný	Switzerland; Charles Dussuet & Henri Kadrnka; Enz & Hiltbrand; Jean Pessina & Robert Zürcher
1961 Hainsberg	East Germany; Gernot Bergmann & Horst Rosenhagen; Dieter Friedrich & Horst Kleinert; Günther Merkel & Manfred Merkel	Czechoslovakia; Zdeněk Baumruk & Josef Polák; Josef Hendrych & Vladimír Lánský; Miroslav Stach & Zdeněk Valenta	Switzerland; Charles Dussuet & Jean-Paul Rössinger; Jean Meichtry & Suchet; Jean Pessina & Robert Zürcher
1963 Spittal	East Germany; Siegfried Lück & Jürgen Noak; Günther Merkel & Manfred Merkel; Manfred Glöckner & Rudolf Seifert	West Germany; Günter Brümmer & Hermann Roock; Jürgen Hauschild & Kurt Longrich; Wolf Dieter Seller & Günther Tuchel	Austria; Anton Biegel & Helmut Schilhuber; Klaus Gürtelbauer & Bruno Kerbl; Alfred Haberzettl & Franz Tutschka
1965 Spittal	Czechoslovakia; Ladislav Měšťan & Zdeněk Měšťan; Emil Pollert & Jaroslav Pollert; Jaroslav Brejcha & Milan Kalas	Yugoslavia; Janez Andrejašič & Jože Gerkman; Milan Vidmar & Borut Justin; Franc Žitnik & Leon Žitnik	West Germany; Friedrich Bohry & Walter Gehlen; Hermann Roock & Norbert Schmidt; Wolf Dieter Seller & Günther Tuchel
1967 Lipno	East Germany; Günther Merkel & Manfred Merkel; Ulrich Hippauf & Willi Landers; Jürgen Noak & Siegfried Lück	Czechoslovakia; Zdeněk Valenta & Miroslav Stach; Gabriel Janoušek & Milan Horyna; Ladislav Měšťan & Zdeněk Měšťan	West Germany; Manfred Heß & Wolfgang Wenzel; Karl-Heinz Scheffer & Heinz-Jürgen Steinschulte; Klaus Nenninger & Gere Glück
1969 Bourg St.-Maurice	West Germany; Karl-Heinz Scheffer & Heinz-Jürgen Steinschulte; Manfred Heß & Wolfgang Wenzel; Hermann Roock & Norbert Schmidt	Czechoslovakia; Miroslav Stach & Zdeněk Valenta; Ladislav Měšťan & Zdeněk Měšťan; Jiří Dejl & Zdeněk Sklenář	France; Jean-Claude Olry & Jean-Louis Olry; Alain Duvivier & Dominique Duvivier; Louis Devilleneuve & Pierre Devilleneuve
1971 Meran	East Germany; Rolf-Dieter Amend & Walter Hofmann; Klaus Trummer & Jürgen Kretschmer; Uwe Franz & Ulrich Opelt	West Germany; Karl-Heinz Scheffer & Heinz-Jürgen Steinschulte; Manfred Heß & Wolfgang Wenzel; Hans Jakob Hitz & Theo Nüsing	Czechoslovakia; Ladislav Měšťan & Zdeněk Měšťan; Antonín Brabec & František Kadaňka; Milan Horyna & Gabriel Janoušek
1973 Muotathal	West Germany; Olaf Fricke & Michael Reimann; Karl-Heinz Scheffer & Heinz-Jürgen Steinschulte; Wilhelm Baues & Hans-Otto Schumacher	Czechoslovakia; Josef Havela & Bohumír Machát; Antonín Brabec & František Kadaňka; Jiří Krejza & Jaroslav Pollert	East Germany; Jürgen Köhler & Hubert Kraeft; Peter Grabowski & Josef Raschke; Klaus Trummer & Jürgen Kretschmer
1975 Skopje	East Germany; Rolf-Dieter Amend & Walter Hofmann; Herbert Fischer & Jürgen Henze; Klaus Trummer & Jürgen Kretschmer	Czechoslovakia; Radomír Halfar & Svetomír Kmošťák; Antonín Brabec & František Kadaňka; Jiří Benhák & Ladislav Benhák	Poland; Zbigniew Leśniak & Maciej Rychta; Jan Frączek & Ryszard Seruga; Wojciech Kudlik & Jerzy Jeż
1977 Spittal	Czechoslovakia; Jiří Benhák & Ladislav Benhák; Radomír Halfar & Svetomír Kmošťák; Miroslav Nedvěd & Pavel Schwarc	Switzerland; Martin Wyss & Roland Wyss; Matthias Hirsch & Manfred Walter; Jiří Krejza & Jan Karel	Poland; Jan Frączek & Ryszard Seruga; Wojciech Kudlik & Jerzy Jeż; Zbigniew Leśniak & Maciej Rychta
1979 Jonquière	Poland; Wojciech Kudlik & Jerzy Jeż; Jan Frączek & Ryszard Seruga; Zbigniew Czaja & Jacek Kasprzycki	France; Pierre Calori & Jacques Calori; Richard Hernanz & Mare Labedens; Jean Lamy & Robert Platt	Switzerland; Christoph Studer & Ernst Rudin; Martin Wyss & Roland Wyss; Hardy Künzli & Peter Probst
1981 Bala	Great Britain; Jock Young & Alistair Munro; Robert Joce & Robert Owen; Eric Jamieson & Robin Williams	Poland; Wojciech Kudlik & Jerzy Jeż; Marek Maslanka & Ryszard Seruga; Zbigniew Czaja & Jacek Kasprzycki	United States; Carl Gutschick & Paul Flack; Paul Grabow & Jefry Huey; Steve Garvis & Mike Garvis
1983 Meran	Czechoslovakia; Miroslav Hajdučík & Milan Kučera; Dušan Zaťko & Ľudovít Tkáč; František Slavík & Jiří Decastelo	United States; Lecky Haller & Fritz Haller; Steve Garvis & Mike Garvis; Charles Harris & John Harris	Great Britain; Eric Jamieson & Robin Williams; Michael Smith & Andrew Smith; Robert Joce & Robert Owen
1985 Augsburg	Czechoslovakia; Jiří Rohan & Miroslav Šimek; Miroslav Hajdučík & Milan Kučera; Viktor Beneš & Ondřej Mohout	France; Pierre Calori & Jacques Calori; Emmanuel del Rey & Thierry Saidi; Michel Saidi & Jérôme Daval	United States; Charles Harris & John Harris; Lecky Haller & Fritz Haller; Paul Grabow & Mike Garvis
1987 Bourg St.-Maurice	France; Pierre Calori & Jacques Calori; Michel Saidi & Jérôme Daval; Gilles Lelievre & Jérôme Daille	Czechoslovakia; Jiří Rohan & Miroslav Šimek; Miroslav Hajdučík & Milan Kučera; Viktor Beneš & Ondřej Mohout	West Germany; Frank Hemmer & Thomas Loose; Günther Wolkenaer & Fredi Zimmermann; Stephan Bittner & Volker Nerlich
1989 Savage River	France; Emmanuel del Rey & Thierry Saidi; Michel Saidi & Jérôme Daval; Gilles Lelievre & Jérôme Daille	Czechoslovakia; Jiří Rohan & Miroslav Šimek; Jan Petříček & Tomáš Petříček; Miroslav Hajdučík & Milan Kučera	West Germany; Frank Hemmer & Thomas Loose; Frank Becker & Martin Fröhlke; Stephan Bittner & Volker Nerlich
1991 Tacen	France; Frank Adisson & Wilfrid Forgues; Thierry Saidi & Emmanuel del Rey; Gilles Lelievre & Jérôme Daille	Czechoslovakia; Jiří Rohan & Miroslav Šimek; Petr Štercl & Pavel Štercl; Viktor Beneš & Milan Kučera	Germany; Michael Trummer & Manfred Berro; Stephan Bittner & Volker Nerlich; Frank Hemmer & Thomas Loose
1993 Mezzana	Czech Republic; Marek Jiras & Tomáš Máder; Petr Štercl & Pavel Štercl; Jiří Rohan & Miroslav Šimek	France; Éric Biau & Bertrand Daille; Thierry Saidi & Emmanuel del Rey; Frank Adisson & Wilfrid Forgues	Slovakia; Roman Štrba & Roman Vajs; Juraj Ontko & Ladislav Čáni; Viktor Beneš & Milan Kučera
1995 Nottingham	Czech Republic; Jiří Rohan & Miroslav Šimek; Petr Štercl & Pavel Štercl; Jaroslav Pospíšil & Jaroslav Pollert	France; Thierry Saidi & Emmanuel del Rey; Frank Adisson & Wilfrid Forgues; Éric Biau & Bertrand Daille	Germany; Michael Trummer & Manfred Berro; Rüdiger Hübbers & Udo Raumann; André Ehrenberg & Michael Senft
1997 Três Coroas	France; Frank Adisson & Wilfrid Forgues; Thierry Saidi & Emmanuel del Rey; Éric Biau & Bertrand Daille	Czech Republic; Jiří Rohan & Miroslav Šimek; Petr Štercl & Pavel Štercl; Marek Jiras & Tomáš Máder	Germany; Michael Trummer & Manfred Berro; André Ehrenberg & Michael Senft; Kay Simon & Robby Simon
1999 La Seu d'Urgell	Czech Republic; Marek Jiras & Tomáš Máder; Jaroslav Volf & Ondřej Štěpánek; Jaroslav Pospíšil & Jaroslav Pollert	Slovakia; Roman Štrba & Roman Vajs; Milan Kubáň & Marián Olejník; Pavol Hochschorner & Peter Hochschorner	France; Frank Adisson & Wilfrid Forgues; Éric Biau & Bertrand Daille; Philippe Quémerais & Yann Le Pennec
2002 Bourg St.-Maurice	France; Pierre Luquet & Christophe Luquet; Alexandre Lauvergne & Nathanael Fouquet; Philippe Quémerais & Yann Le Pennec	Germany; Kay Simon & Robby Simon; Kai Walter & Frank Henze; André Ehrenberg & Michael Senft	Poland; Dariusz Wrzosek & Bartłomiej Kruczek; Jarosław Miczek & Wojciech Sekuła; Andrzej Wójs & Sławomir Mordarski
2003 Augsburg	Czech Republic; Jaroslav Volf & Ondřej Štěpánek; Jaroslav Pospíšil & Jaroslav Pollert; Marek Jiras & Tomáš Máder	Germany; Marcus Becker & Stefan Henze; André Ehrenberg & Michael Senft; Kay Simon & Robby Simon	Poland; Andrzej Wójs & Sławomir Mordarski; Jarosław Miczek & Wojciech Sekuła; Marcin Pochwała & Paweł Sarna
2005 Penrith (non-medal event)	Germany; Christian Bahmann & Michael Senft; Kay Simon & Robby Simon; Marcus Becker & Stefan Henze	Czech Republic; Jaroslav Pospíšil & Jaroslav Pollert; Marek Jiras & Tomáš Máder; Jaroslav Volf & Ondřej Štěpánek	France; Remy Alonso & Victor Lamy; Philippe Quémerais & Yann Le Pennec; Cédric Forgit & Martin Braud
2006 Prague	Czech Republic; Marek Jiras & Tomáš Máder; Jaroslav Volf & Ondřej Štěpánek; Jaroslav Pospíšil & Jaroslav Pollert	Germany; Marcus Becker & Stefan Henze; Felix Michel & Sebastian Piersig; Kay Simon & Robby Simon	Slovakia; Pavol Hochschorner & Peter Hochschorner; Milan Kubáň & Marián Olejník; Ľuboš Šoška & Peter Šoška
2007 Foz do Iguaçu	Czech Republic; Jaroslav Volf & Ondřej Štěpánek; Marek Jiras & Tomáš Máder; Jaroslav Pospíšil & David Mrůzek	France; Cédric Forgit & Martin Braud; Pierre Luquet & Christophe Luquet; Damien Troquenet & Mathieu Voyemant	Slovakia; Pavol Hochschorner & Peter Hochschorner; Ladislav Škantár & Peter Škantár; Tomáš Kučera & Ján Bátik
2009 La Seu d'Urgell	Slovakia; Pavol Hochschorner & Peter Hochschorner; Ladislav Škantár & Peter Škantár; Tomáš Kučera & Ján Bátik	Germany; David Schröder & Frank Henze; Marcus Becker & Stefan Henze; Robert Behling & Thomas Becker	Great Britain; Tim Baillie & Etienne Stott; David Florence & Richard Hounslow; Daniel Goddard & Colin Radmore
2010 Tacen	France; Denis Gargaud Chanut & Fabien Lefèvre; Gauthier Klauss & Matthieu Péché; Pierre Picco & Hugo Biso	Czech Republic; Jaroslav Volf & Ondřej Štěpánek; Tomáš Koplík & Jakub Vrzáň; Lukáš Přinda & Jan Havlíček	Germany; Kai Müller & Kevin Müller; Robert Behling & Thomas Becker; David Schröder & Frank Henze
2011 Bratislava	France; Gauthier Klauss & Matthieu Péché; Pierre Labarelle & Nicolas Peschier; Denis Gargaud Chanut & Fabien Lefèvre	Slovakia; Pavol Hochschorner & Peter Hochschorner; Ladislav Škantár & Peter Škantár; Tomáš Kučera & Ján Bátik	Great Britain; David Florence & Richard Hounslow; Tim Baillie & Etienne Stott; Rhys Davies & Matthew Lister
2013 Prague	Czech Republic; Ondřej Karlovský & Jakub Jáně; Jonáš Kašpar & Marek Šindler; Jaroslav Volf & Ondřej Štěpánek	Slovakia; Pavol Hochschorner & Peter Hochschorner; Ladislav Škantár & Peter Škantár; Tomáš Kučera & Ján Bátik	Great Britain; David Florence & Richard Hounslow; Rhys Davies & Matthew Lister; Adam Burgess & Greg Pitt
2014 Deep Creek Lake	France; Pierre Labarelle & Nicolas Peschier; Gauthier Klauss & Matthieu Péché; Pierre Picco & Hugo Biso	Slovakia; Pavol Hochschorner & Peter Hochschorner; Ladislav Škantár & Peter Škantár; Tomáš Kučera & Ján Bátik	Czech Republic; Ondřej Karlovský & Jakub Jáně; Jonáš Kašpar & Marek Šindler; Tomáš Koplík & Jakub Vrzáň
2015 London	France; Pierre Picco & Hugo Biso; Gauthier Klauss & Matthieu Péché; Yves Prigent & Loïc Kervella	Germany; Franz Anton & Jan Benzien; Robert Behling & Thomas Becker; Kai Müller & Kevin Müller	Great Britain; David Florence & Richard Hounslow; Mark Proctor & Etienne Stott; Adam Burgess & Greg Pitt
2017 Pau (non-decoration event)	France; Gauthier Klauss & Matthieu Péché; Nicolas Scianimanico & Hugo Cailhol; Pierre Picco & Hugo Biso	Germany; Robert Behling & Thomas Becker; Kai Müller & Kevin Müller; Franz Anton & Jan Benzien	Slovakia; Ladislav Škantár & Peter Škantár; Tomáš Kučera & Ján Bátik; Pavol Hochschorner & Peter Hochschorner

- Medal table

Rank	Nation	Gold	Silver	Bronze	Total
1	France (FRA)	12	5	2	19
2	Czech Republic (CZE)	7	2	1	10
3	Czechoslovakia	6	11	2	19
4	East Germany	6	1	2	9
5	West Germany	2	2	4	8
6	Slovakia (SVK)	1	4	3	8
7	Poland (POL)	1	1	4	6
8	Great Britain (GBR)	1	0	5	6
9	Germany (GER)	0	5	4	9
10	Switzerland (SUI)	0	3	4	7
11	United States (USA)	0	1	2	3
12	Yugoslavia	0	1	0	1
13	Austria (AUT)	0	0	2	2
Totals (13 entries)		36	36	35	107
