= 1971 Wildwater Canoeing World Championships =

- Host city: Merano, Italy
- Level: Senior
- Events: 10

The 1971 Wildwater Canoeing World Championships was the 7th edition of the global wildwater canoeing competition, Wildwater Canoeing World Championships, organised by the International Canoe Federation.

== Podiums ==
=== K1 ===
Men
Rank	Athlete	Country	Time
1st place, gold medalist(s)	Bernd Kast	West Germany
2nd place, silver medalist(s)	Kurt Presslmayr	Austria
3rd place, bronze medalist(s)	Jochen Schwarz	West Germany

Women
Rank	Athlete	Country	Time
1st place, gold medalist(s)	Ulrike Deppe	West Germany
2nd place, silver medalist(s)	Magda Wunderlich	West Germany
3rd place, bronze medalist(s)	Ludmilla Polesna	Czechoslovakia

Men team
Rank	Athlete	Country	Time
1st place, gold medalist(s)	Ulrich Pech; Bernd Kast; Jochen Schwarz	West Germany
2nd place, silver medalist(s)	Gerhard Peinhaupt; Manfred Pock; Kurt Presslmayr	Austria
3rd place, bronze medalist(s)	Jean-Pierre Burny; Jean-Claude Michiels; Philippe Prévost	Belgium

Women team
Rank	Athlete	Country	Time
1st place, gold medalist(s)	Annemie Amslinger; Ulrike Deppe; Magda Wunderlich	West Germany
2nd place, silver medalist(s)	Irena Komancova; Ludmilla Polesna; Bohumila Kapplova	Czechoslovakia
3rd place, bronze medalist(s)	Mélanie Alexis; Ingrid Burny; Rosine Roland	Belgium

=== C1 ===
Men
Rank	Athlete	Country	Time
1st place, gold medalist(s)	Peter Sodomka	Czechoslovakia
2nd place, silver medalist(s)	Bernd Heinemann	West Germany
3rd place, bronze medalist(s)	Walter Gehlen	West Germany

Men team
Rank	Athlete	Country	Time
1st place, gold medalist(s)	Walter Gehlen; Bernd Heinemann; Wolfgang Jogwer	West Germany
2nd place, silver medalist(s)	Jiri Vocka; Karel Tresnak; Peter Sodomka	Czechoslovakia
3rd place, bronze medalist(s)	John Sweet; Al Button; Russ Nichols	United States

=== C2 ===
Men
Rank	Athlete	Country	Time
1st place, gold medalist(s)	Pierre-François Lefauconnier; Gilles Lefauconnier	France
2nd place, silver medalist(s)	Heimo Müllneritsch; Helmar Steindl	Austria
3rd place, bronze medalist(s)	Jean-Paul Meynard; Claude Bost	France

Men team
Rank	Athlete	Country	Time
1st place, gold medalist(s)	Wenzel / Hess; Spengler / Stock; Roock / Schmidt	West Germany
2nd place, silver medalist(s)	Kadaňka / Brabec; Janoušek / Horyna; Měšťan / Měšťan	Czechoslovakia
3rd place, bronze medalist(s)	Allen / Willams; Bradley / Swift; Godwin / Court	United Kingdom

Mixed
Rank	Athlete	Country	Time
1st place, gold medalist(s)	Hanneliese Spitz; Helmut Ramelov	Austria
2nd place, silver medalist(s)	Claudette Parisy; Alain Feuillette	France
3rd place, bronze medalist(s)	France Gaud; Georges Dransart	France

Mixed team
Rank	Athlete	Country	Time
1st place, gold medalist(s)	Gaud / Dransart; Parisy / Feuillette; Ravilly / Guilbaud	France
2nd place, silver medalist(s)	Lasseur / Gauert; Rose / Rose; Schönherr / Gebert	West Germany
3rd place, bronze medalist(s)	Svoboda / Legatova; Koudelka/ Koudelkova; Krejza/ Sirotkova	Czechoslovakia

== Medal table ==
Rank	Country	1st place, gold medalist(s)	2nd place, silver medalist(s)	3rd place, bronze medalist(s)	Tot.
1	West Germany	5	4	2	11
2	France	3	1	2	6
3	Austria	1	3	0	4
4	Czechoslovakia	1	2	3	6
5	Belgium	0	0	2	2
6	United States	0	0	1	1
Total		10	10	10	30

== See also ==
- Wildwater canoeing
