= Měšťan =

Měšťan is a surname. Notable people with the surname include:

- Ladislav Měšťan (born 1941), Czechoslovak slalom canoeist
- Zdeněk Měšťan (born 1944), Czechoslovak slalom canoeist
