= Moos =

Moos may refer to:

== People ==
=== Surname ===
- Alexandre Moos (born 1972), Swiss mountain biker
- Bill Moos, American athletic director
- Carl Moos (1878–1959), Swiss artist
- Carolyn Moos (born 1978), American basketball player
- David Moos (born 1965), Canadian-born art curator
- Dietmar Moos, West German slalom canoeist
- Gerald Moos, West German slalom canoeist
- Gustave Moos (1905–1948), Swiss Olympic cyclist
- Heinrich Moos (1895–1976), German Olympic fencer
- Jeanne Moos, American journalist
- Julie Moos (born 1966), Canadian photographer and art writer
- Ludwig von Moos (1910–1990), Swiss politician
- Lotte Moos (1909–2008) German-born poet and playwright
- Malcolm Moos (1916–1982), American political scientist
- Nanabhoy Ardeshir Framji Moos, 19th-century of Colaba Observatory in Mumbai, India
- Peder Moos (1906–1991), Danish furniture designer
- Salomon Moos (1831–1895), German otologist

=== First name ===
- Moos Linneman (born 1931), Dutch Olympic boxer
- Moos (singer) (born 1974), French singer

== Places ==
- Moos in Passeier, South Tyrol, Italy
- Moos, Baden-Württemberg, in the district of Konstanz, Baden-Württemberg, Germany
- Moos, Bavaria, in the district of Deggendorf, Bavaria, Germany
- Moos (mountain), a mountain in the Black Forest of Germany

== See also ==
- Moo (disambiguation)
- Moose (disambiguation)
- Moss (disambiguation)
