= Ťoupalík =

Ťoupalík is a Czech surname. Notable people with the surname include:

- Adam Ťoupalík (born 1996), Czech cyclist
- Karel Ťoupalík, Czechoslovak slalom canoeist
