= Kasprzycki =

Kasprzycki (feminine Kasprzycka) is a Polish surname. Notable people include:

- Jacek Kasprzycki, Polish slalom canoeist
- Justyna Kasprzycka (born 1987), Polish athlete
- Mieczysław Kasprzycki (1910–2001), Polish ice hockey player
- Tadeusz Kasprzycki (1891–1978), Polish military officer
- Wincenty Kasprzycki (1802–1849), Polish painter
