= Blacksocks =

Online sock retailer

- Company type: Private
- Industry: Clothing retailer
- Founded: June 1999; 26 years ago
- Founders: Samy Liechti; Marcel Roth
- Headquarters: Balgach, Switzerland
- Products: Socks; underwear; t-shirts
- Services: Subscription service
- Parent: Jacob Rohner AG
- Website: blacksocks.com

Blacksocks is a European men's clothing subscription service and online retailer founded in 1999, specializing in luxury socks, underwear and t-shirts. With no requirement to pay in advance, customers receive a fixed quantity of socks at regular intervals of 1–4 times annually, charged to a payment method of their choice prior to each shipment. The yarn for the socks is spun, finished and dyed near Milan, Italy and then sent to Barcelos, Portugal where they are all knit and packaged for shipment. The socks come in a limited variety of colors and styles—typically only sneaker ("no-show"), crew or knee length—that are made of cotton (either 100% organic or blended with mercerised and Pima), pure Merino wool or a 65/25/8 blend of modal, polyamide and cashmere.

The company has also expanded into a line of men's underwear and t-shirts, as well as offering athletic and ski socks.

Blacksocks has 60,000 active customers, primarily in France, Germany and Switzerland, and, as of March 2009, the company maintains a growing presence in the United States.

== History ==
The company was founded in June 1999 by Marcel Roth and Samy Liechti as a general partnership. According to Liechti, he was inspired to form a sock subscription service after wearing mismatched socks to a traditional Japanese tea ceremony held for business clients. In 2001, the company incorporated and changed its name to Blacksocks SA, based out of Zurich. Roth left the company in 2005. By 2009, Blacksocks had delivered over one million pairs of socks within Europe. Their original subscription plan offered three pairs of identical socks delivered every four months for an annual "sockscription" of US$89.

== North American launch ==
Blacksocks expanded its coverage when it launched in North America on March 19, 2009. Lori Rosen, founder of New York-based public relations firm Rosen Group PR, serves as managing partner for U.S. operations, with the Rosen Group also overseeing the company’s public relations. Rosen was selected for the position after she approached Liechti about marketing the concept in North America upon learning about its history and track record during a European business trip.

== Milestone ==
In September 2008, Blacksocks celebrated its one-millionth pair of calf socks sold.

== Technology ==
In September 2012, Blacksocks released its Smarter Socks, the first socks to use RFID technology to facilitate sorting and ensure that each sock is correctly matched to its original mate after laundering. The RFID chips embedded near the cuff of each Smarter Sock communicates with the company's mobile app, Sock Sorter, which guides owners through the rematching process. The app can also use the device's camera to determine if any color fading has occurred for any brand of sock, and records other data about the Smarter Socks such as wash count, date of order, pair status, ID number and whether the sock is left- or right-footed.

In April 2017, Blacksocks launched an order button for customers to order socks and other items directly from their closets.

== See also ==
- List of sock manufacturers
