= Steve Draper =

Medal record

Men's canoe slalom

Representing United States

World Championships
Bronze medal – third place	1975 Skopje	Mixed C-2

Steve Draper is a former American slalom canoeist who competed in the mid-to-late 1970s. He won a bronze medal in the mixed C-2 event at the 1975 ICF Canoe Slalom World Championships in Skopje.
