= Elfriede Hugo =

East German canoeist

Sport
- Sport: Kayaking
- Event: Folding kayak
Medal record
Women's canoe slalom
Representing East Germany
World Championships
Gold medal – first place	1955 Tacen	Folding K-1 team
Gold medal – first place	1957 Augsburg	Folding K-1 team
Gold medal – first place	1959 Geneva	Folding K-1 team

Elfriede Hugo is a former East German slalom canoeist who competed in the 1950s. She won three gold medals in the folding K-1 team event at the ICF Canoe Slalom World Championships, earning them in 1955, 1957 and 1959.
