= Canoeing at the 1972 Summer Olympics – Men's slalom C-2 =

These are the results of the men's C-2 slalom competition in canoeing at the 1972 Summer Olympics. The C-2 (canoe single) event is raced by two-man canoes through a whitewater course. The venue for the 1972 Olympic competition was in Augsburg.

== Medalists ==
Gold	Silver	Bronze
Walter Hofmann and Rolf-Dieter Amend (GDR)	Hans-Otto Schumacher and Wilhelm Baues (FRG)	Jean-Louis Olry and Jean-Claude Olry (FRA)

== Results ==
The 20 teams each took two runs through the whitewater slalom course on August 30. The best time of the two runs counted for the event.

Rank	Name	Run 1			Run 2			Result
Rank	Name	Time	Points	Total	Time	Points	Total	Total
Gold	Walter Hofmann & Rolf-Dieter Amend (GDR)	270.68	40	310.68	285.51	160	445.51	310.68
Silver	Hans-Otto Schumacher & Wilhelm Baues (FRG)	286.96	30	316.96	291.90	20	311.90	311.90
Bronze	Jean-Louis Olry & Jean-Claude Olry (FRA)	322.04	40	362.04	305.10	10	315.10	315.10
4	Jürgen Kretschmer & Klaus Trummer (GDR)	299.57	30	329.57	-	-	-	329.57
5	Jan Frączek & Ryszard Seruga (POL)	326.31	40	366.31	316.78	70	386.78	366.31
6	Janez Andrejašič & Peter Guzelj (YUG)	-	-	-	318.01	50	368.01	372.88
7	Michael Reimann & Olaf Fricke (FRG)	301.86	70	371.86	310.00	200	510.00	371.86
8	Heimo Müllneritsch & Helmar Steindl (AUT)	305.14	70	375.14	296.72	160	456.72	375.14
9	Theo Nüsing & Hans Jakob Hitz (FRG)	306.67	80	386.67	324.38	90	414.38	386.67
10	František Kadaňka & Antonín Brabec (TCH)	308.88	80	388.88	312.33	150	462.33	388.88
11	Gabriel Janoušek & Milan Horyna (TCH)	-	-	-	322.30	80	402.30	402.30
12	Tom Southworth & John Burton (USA)	387.83	40	427.83	317.55	90	407.55	407.55
13	Jerzy Jeż & Wojciech Kudlik (POL)	-	-	-	366.10	50	416.10	416.10
14	Russ Nichols & John Evans (USA)	322.02	200	522.02	310.08	130	440.08	440.08
15	David Allen & Lindsay Williams (GBR)	-	-	-	367.08	80	447.08	447.08
16	Zdeněk Měšťan & Ladislav Měšťan (TCH)	319.10	130	449.10	319.00	140	459.00	449.10
17	Maciej Rychta & Zbigniew Leśniak (POL)	299.64	160	459.64	295.70	160	455.70	455.70
18	Jürgen Henze & Herbert Fischer (GDR)	-	-	-	308.44	200	508.44	508.44
19	Dušan Tuma & Franc Žitnik (YUG)	328.55	230	558.55	-	-	-	558.55
20	John Court & Jon Goodwin (GBR)	-	-	-	-	-	-	Did not finish
