= Hilde Urbaniak =

West German slalom canoeist

Sport
- Sport: Kayaking
- Event: Folding kayak
Medal record
Women's canoe slalom
Representing Germany
World Championships
Gold medal – first place	1959 Geneva	Folding K-1

Hilde Urbaniak is a retired West German slalom canoeist who competed in the late 1950s. She won a gold medal in the folding K-1 event at the 1959 ICF Canoe Slalom World Championships in Geneva.
