= Inge Walthemate =

German canoeist

Sport
- Sport: Kayaking
- Event: Folding kayak
Medal record
Women's canoe slalom
Representing East Germany
World Championships
Silver medal – second place	1957 Augsburg	Folding K-1 team
Bronze medal – third place	1959 Geneva	Folding K-1

Inge Walthemate is a retired West German slalom canoeist who competed in the late 1950s. She won two medals at the ICF Canoe Slalom World Championships with a silver in 1957 (Folding K-1 team) and a bronze in 1959 (Folding K-1).
