= John Evans (canoeist) =

American retired slalom canoeist

John Richard Evans (born August 5, 1949 in Los Angeles) is an American retired slalom canoeist who competed from the late 1960s to the mid-1970s. He finished 14th in the C-2 event at the 1972 Summer Olympics in Munich.
