= Margot Seidler =

Medal record

Women's canoe slalom

Representing East Germany

World Championships
Gold medal – first place	1957 Augsburg	Mixed C-2 team

Margot Seidler is a former East German slalom canoeist who competed in the 1950s. She won a gold medal in the mixed C-2 team event at the 1957 ICF Canoe Slalom World Championships in Augsburg.
