= Lindsay Williams (canoeist) =

British canoeist (born 1946)

Lindsay Williams (born 22 April 1946) is a British retired slalom canoeist who competed in the 1970s. He finished 15th in the C-2 event at the 1972 Summer Olympics in Munich.
