= Bernd Dichtl =

German slalom canoeist

Medal record

Men's canoe slalom

Representing West Germany

World Championships
Gold medal – first place	1975 Skopje	K-1 team

Bernd Dichtl (born 17 November 1950 in Augusburg) is a retired slalom canoeist who competed for West Germany in the 1970s.

He won a gold medal in the K-1 team event at the 1975 ICF Canoe Slalom World Championships in Skopje.
