= David Allen (canoeist) =

British retired slalom canoeist (born 1943)

David Allen (born 12 June 1943) is a British retired slalom canoeist who competed in the 1970s. He finished 15th in the C-2 event at the 1972 Summer Olympics in Munich.
