= 1959 ICF Canoe Slalom World Championships =

Canoe slalom event in Geneva, Switzerland

The 1959 ICF Canoe Slalom World Championships were held in Geneva, Switzerland under the auspices of International Canoe Federation for the second time. It was the 6th edition. The mixed C2 team event was not held at these championships after taking place in the previous one. The Swiss city hosted the championships previously in 1949.

== Medal summary ==
=== Men's ===
==== Canoe ====
Event	Gold	Points	Silver	Points	Bronze	Points
C1	Vladimír Jirásek (TCH)	421	Manfred Schubert (GDR)	453	Karl-Heinz Wozniak (GDR)	470
C1 team	Czechoslovakia; Luděk Beneš; Václav Janovský; Vladimír Jirásek	772	East Germany; Manfred Schubert; Karl-Heinz Wozniak; Gert Kleinert	872	Switzerland; Jean-Claude Tochon; Marcel Roth; Roland Bardet	1078
C2	East Germany; Dieter Friedrich; Horst Kleinert	395	Czechoslovakia; Václav Havel; Josef Hendrych	446	East Germany; Dieter Göthe; Lothar Schubert	448
C2 team	East Germany; Dieter Friedrich & Horst Kleinert; Dieter Göthe & Lothar Schubert; Rudolf Seifert & Manfred Glöckner	664	Czechoslovakia; Václav Havel & Josef Hendrych; Milan Kný & Milan Horyna; Vladimír Lánský & Miroslav Čihák	811	Switzerland; Charles Dussuet & Henri Kadrnka; Jean Pessina & Robert Zürcher; Enz & Hiltbrand	912

==== Kayak ====
Event	Gold	Points	Silver	Points	Bronze	Points
Folding K1	Paul Farrant (GBR)	335	Eberhard Gläser (GDR)	344	Heinz Bielig (GDR)	395.3
Folding K1 team	East Germany; Eberhard Gläser; Heinz Bielig; Günther Möbius	529	Czechoslovakia; Jan Pára; Vladimír Cibák; Zdeněk Košťál	614	West Germany; Manfred Vogt; Georg Samhuber; Werner Vogler	653

=== Mixed ===
==== Canoe ====
Event	Gold	Points	Silver	Points	Bronze	Points
C2	East Germany; Rita Behrend; Manfred Merkel	610	East Germany; Margitta Troger; Günther Merkel	810	East Germany; Ellen Krügel; Siegfried Seidemann	849

=== Women's ===
==== Kayak ====
Event	Gold	Points	Silver	Points	Bronze	Points
Folding K1	Hilde Urbaniak (FRG)	589	Anneliese Bauer (GDR)	597	Inge Walthemate (FRG)	627
Folding K1 team	East Germany; Ursula Gläser; Eva Setzkorn; Elfriede Hugo	1104	-		-	

== Medal table ==
Rank	Nation	Gold	Silver	Bronze	Total
1	East Germany (GDR)	5	5	4	14
2	Czechoslovakia (TCH)	2	3	0	5
3	West Germany (FRG)	1	0	2	3
4	Great Britain (GBR)	1	0	0	1
5	Switzerland (SUI)	0	0	2	2
Totals (5 entries)		9	8	8	25
