= Manfred Merkel =

East German canoeist

Medal record

Men's canoe slalom

Representing East Germany

World Championships
Gold medal – first place	1959 Geneva	Mixed C-2
Gold medal – first place	1961 Hainsberg	C-2
Gold medal – first place	1961 Hainsberg	C-2 team
Gold medal – first place	1963 Spittal	C-2
Gold medal – first place	1963 Spittal	C-2 team
Gold medal – first place	1965 Spittal	C-2
Gold medal – first place	1967 Lipno	C-2 team

Manfred Merkel (born 3 November 1938) is a retired slalom canoeist who competed for East Germany.

Merkel was born in 1938 in Meuselwitz. He competed from the late 1950s to the late 1960s. He won seven gold medals at the ICF Canoe Slalom World Championships (C-2: 1961, 1963, 1965; C-2 team: 1961, 1963, 1967; Mixed C-2: 1959).

== See also ==
- Günther Merkel
