= Milan Řehoř (canoeist) =

Medal record

Men's canoe slalom

Representing Czechoslovakia

World Championships
| Gold medal – first place | 1955 Tacen | C-2 team |
| Gold medal – first place | 1957 Augsburg | C-2 team |

Milan Řehoř is a former Czechoslovak slalom canoeist who competed in the 1950s. He won two gold medals in the C-2 team event at the ICF Canoe Slalom World Championships, earning them in 1955 and 1957.
