= Reinhard Eiben =

East German canoeist

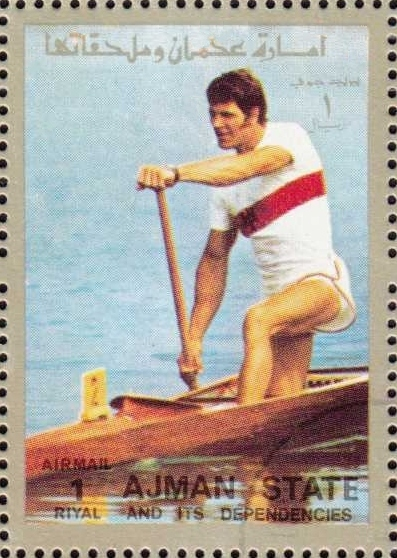
- Eiben on a stamp of Ajman

Personal information
- Born: 4 December 1951 (age 74) Crossen, Zwickau, East Germany
- Height: 170 cm (5 ft 7 in)
- Weight: 69 kg (152 lb)

Sport
- Sport: Canoe slalom
- Club: SC DHfK, Leipzig
Medal record
Representing East Germany
Olympic Games
Gold medal – first place	1972 Munich	C-1
World Championships
Gold medal – first place	1973 Muotathal	C-1
Gold medal – first place	1977 Spittal	C-1 team
Silver medal – second place	1973 Muotathal	C-1 team
Silver medal – second place	1975 Skopje	C-1 team

Reinhard Eiben (born 4 December 1951) is a retired East German slalom canoeist who won an individual gold medal at the 1972 Olympics. He won two more gold medals at the world championships, in the C-1 event in 1973 and in the C-1 team event in 1977.
