= Svetomír Kmošťák =

Medal record

Men's canoe slalom

Representing Czechoslovakia

World Championships
Gold medal – first place	1977 Spittal	C-2 team
Silver medal – second place	1975 Skopje	C-2 team

Svetomír Kmošťák is a former Czechoslovak slalom canoeist who competed in the 1970s.

He won two medals in the C-2 team event at the ICF Canoe Slalom World Championships with a gold in 1977 and a silver in 1975.
