= Robert Joce =

Former British Canoe slalom racer

Medal record

Men's canoe slalom

Representing Great Britain

World Championships
| Gold medal – first place | 1981 Bala | C-2 team |
| Bronze medal – third place | 1983 Meran | C-2 team |

Robert Joce is a former British slalom canoeist who competed in the 1980s.

He won two medals in the C-2 team event at the ICF Canoe Slalom World Championships with a gold in 1981 and a bronze in 1983.
