= Jan Šulc (canoeist) =

Czechoslovak slalom canoeist

Medal record

Men's canoe slalom

Representing Czechoslovakia

World Championships
Gold medal – first place	1953 Meran	C-1 team
Silver medal – second place	1949 Geneva	C-2 team
Silver medal – second place	1951 Steyr	C-2 team
Silver medal – second place	1953 Meran	C-2

Jan Šulc (1916 – 30 May 2001) was a Czechoslovak slalom canoeist who competed in the 1940s and the 1950s. He won four medals at the ICF Canoe Slalom World Championships with a gold (C-1 team: 1953) and three silvers (C-2: 1953; C-2 team: 1949, 1951).
