= Günther Tuchel =

German slalom canoeist

Medal record

Men's canoe slalom

Representing West Germany

World Championships
Silver medal – second place	1963 Spittal	C-2 team
Bronze medal – third place	1965 Spittal	C-2 team

Günther Tuchel is a West German retired slalom canoeist who competed in the mid-1960s. He won two medals in the C-2 team event at the ICF Canoe Slalom World Championships with a silver in 1963 and a bronze in 1965.
