= Karl-Heinz Wozniak =

East German slalom canoeist

Medal record

Men's canoe slalom

Representing East Germany

World Championships
Gold medal – first place	1963 Spittal	C-1 team
Silver medal – second place	1955 Tacen	C-1 team
Silver medal – second place	1959 Geneva	C-1 team
Silver medal – second place	1961 Hainsberg	C-1 team
Bronze medal – third place	1955 Tacen	C-1
Bronze medal – third place	1959 Geneva	C-1

Karl-Heinz Wozniak is an East German retired slalom canoeist who competed in the 1950s and the 1960s. He won six medals at the ICF Canoe Slalom World Championships with a gold (C-1 team: 1963), three silvers (C-1 team: 1955, 1959, 1961) and two bronzes (C-1: 1955, 1959).
