= Jiří Hradil (canoeist) =

Medal record

Men's canoe slalom

Representing Czechoslovakia

World Championships
Gold medal – first place	1955 Tacen	C-1 team
Bronze medal – third place	1953 Meran	C-2 team
Bronze medal – third place	1957 Augsburg	C-1 team

Jiří Hradil is a former Czechoslovak slalom canoeist who competed in the 1950s. He won three medals at the ICF Canoe Slalom World Championships with a gold (C-1 team: 1955) and two bronzes (C-1 team: 1957, C-2 team: 1953).
