= Walter Horn (canoeist) =

Medal record

Men's canoe slalom

Representing West Germany

World Championships
Silver medal – second place	1977 Spittal	C-1 team
Silver medal – second place	1979 Jonquière	C-1 team
Bronze medal – third place	1973 Muotathal	C-1 team
Bronze medal – third place	1975 Skopje	C-1 team

Walter Horn (born 29 May 1952 in Wismar) is a former West German slalom canoeist who competed from the mid-1970s to the early 1980s. He won four medals in the C-1 team event at the ICF Canoe Slalom World Championships with two silvers (1977, 1979) and two bronzes (1973, 1975).
