= Jean-Paul Rössinger =

Medal record

Men's canoe slalom

Representing Switzerland

World Championships
Silver medal – second place	1953 Meran	C-1 team
Silver medal – second place	1953 Meran	C-2 team
Silver medal – second place	1957 Augsburg	C-2 team
Bronze medal – third place	1951 Steyr	C-2 team
Bronze medal – third place	1961 Hainsberg	C-2 team

Jean-Paul Rössinger is a Swiss retired slalom canoeist who competed from the early 1950s to the early 1960s. He won five medals at the ICF Canoe Slalom World Championships with three silvers (C-1 team: 1953; C-2 team: 1953, 1957) and two bronzes (C-2 team: 1951, 1961).
