= Harald Heinrich =

East German canoeist

Medal record

Men's canoe slalom

Representing East Germany

World Championships
Silver medal – second place	1975 Skopje	C-1 team
Bronze medal – third place	1975 Skopje	C-1

Harald Heinrich is a former East German slalom canoeist who competed in the mid-1970s. He won two medals at the 1975 ICF Canoe Slalom World Championships in Skopje with a silver in the C-1 team event and a bronze in the C-1 event.
