= Jan Frączek =

Polish canoeist

Medal record

Men's canoe slalom

Representing Poland

World Championships
Gold medal – first place	1979 Jonquière	C-2 team
Bronze medal – third place	1975 Skopje	C-2 team
Bronze medal – third place	1977 Spittal	C-2 team

Jan Frączek (born 21 December 1953 in Nowy Sącz) is a former Polish slalom canoeist who competed in the 1970s.

He won three medals in the C-2 team event at the ICF Canoe Slalom World Championships with a gold (1979) and two bronzes (1975, 1977).

Frączek finished fifth in the C-2 event at the 1972 Summer Olympics in Munich.
