= Simon Gavinet =

French canoeist

Medal record

Men's canoe slalom

Representing France

World Championships
Gold medal – first place	1949 Geneva	C-2 team
Gold medal – first place	1953 Meran	C-2 team

Simon Gavinet is a former French slalom canoeist who competed in the 1940s and the 1950s. He won gold medals in 1949 and 1953 in the C-2 team event at the ICF Canoe Slalom World Championships.
