= Heiner Stumpf =

Medal record

Men's canoe slalom

Representing West Germany

World Championships
Gold medal – first place	1957 Augsburg	C-1 team
Silver medal – second place	1963 Spittal	C-1 team
Silver medal – second place	1965 Spittal	C-1 team

Heiner Stumpf is a former West German slalom canoeist who competed in the 1950s and the 1960s. He won three medals in the C-1 team event at the ICF Canoe Slalom World Championships with a gold (1957) and two silvers (1963, 1965).
