= Ryszard Seruga =

Polish slalom canoeist

Medal record

Men's canoe slalom

Representing Poland

World Championships
Gold medal – first place	1979 Jonquière	C-2 team
Silver medal – second place	1981 Bala	C-2 team
Bronze medal – third place	1975 Skopje	C-2 team
Bronze medal – third place	1977 Spittal	C-2 team

Ryszard Seruga (born March 31, 1953, in Nowy Sącz) is a former Polish slalom canoeist who competed in the 1970s and the 1980s.

He won four medals in the C-2 team event at the ICF Canoe Slalom World Championships with a gold (1979), a silver (1981) and two bronzes (1975, 1977).

Seruga also finished fifth in the C-2 event at the 1972 Summer Olympics in Munich.
