= Martyn Hedges =

British canoeist

Medal record

Men's canoe slalom

Representing Great Britain

World Championships
Bronze medal – third place	1983 Meran	C-1 team
Bronze medal – third place	1985 Augsburg	C-1

Martyn Hedges was a British slalom canoeist who competed from the mid-1970s until his death in 1992. He won two bronze medals at the ICF Canoe Slalom World Championships earning them in 1983 (C-1 team) and 1985 (C-1).

Hedges was a member of Windsor and District Canoe Club. He was selected for the Olympic team when Canoe Slalom was re-introduced to the Barcelona games in 1992, but died in a tragic car accident shortly before the games.

He was national C1 champion twelve times, and was the founder and owner of Bushsport Designs, who pioneered and developed use of neoprene spraydecks.
