= René Gavinet =

French slalom canoeist (1921–2018)

Medal record

Men's canoe slalom

Representing France

World Championships
Gold medal – first place	1949 Geneva	C-2 team
Gold medal – first place	1953 Meran	C-2 team
Silver medal – second place	1955 Tacen	Mixed C-2

René Gavinet (March 26, 1921 – September 12, 2018) was a French slalom canoeist who competed in the 1940s and the 1950s.

He won a silver medal in the mixed C-2 event at the 1955 ICF Canoe Slalom World Championships in Tacen. He also won two gold medals in the C-2 team event, one at the 1949 ICF Canoe Slalom World Championships in Geneva and the other at the 1953 ICF Canoe Slalom World Championships in Meran.
