= Éric Biau =

French slalom canoeist

Medal record

Men's canoe slalom

Representing France

World Championships
Gold medal – first place	1997 Três Coroas	C2 team
Silver medal – second place	1993 Mezzana	C2
Silver medal – second place	1993 Mezzana	C2 team
Silver medal – second place	1995 Nottingham	C2 team
Bronze medal – third place	1995 Nottingham	C2
Bronze medal – third place	1999 La Seu d'Urgell	C2
Bronze medal – third place	1999 La Seu d'Urgell	C2 team

European Championships
Bronze medal – third place	1998 Roudnice nad Labem	C2 team

Éric Biau (born 4 February 1964 in Paris) is a French slalom canoeist who competed from the late 1980s to the late 1990s. He won seven medals at the ICF Canoe Slalom World Championships with a gold (C2 team: 1997), three silvers (C2: 1993; C2 team: 1993, 1995) and three bronzes (C2: 1995, 1999; C2 team: 1999).

He also won a bronze medal in the C2 team event at the 1998 European Championships in Roudnice nad Labem.

Biau also finished 11th in the C2 event at the 1992 Summer Olympics in Barcelona.

His partner in the boat for most of his active career was Bertrand Daille.

== World Cup individual podiums ==
Season	Date	Venue	Position	Event
1992	31 May 1992	Nottingham	3rd	C2
1993	31 Aug 1993	Ocoee	2nd	C2
1994	10 Jul 1994	Bourg St.-Maurice	2nd	C2
1995	9 Jul 1995	Mezzana	3rd	C2
1997	28 Jul 1997	Ocoee	3rd	C2
1997	3 Aug 1997	Minden	3rd	C2
1998	2 Aug 1998	Wausau	1st	C2
