= Pierre Calori =

French slalom canoeist

Medal record

Men's canoe slalom

Representing France

World Championships
Gold medal – first place	1987 Bourg St.-Maurice	C-2
Gold medal – first place	1987 Bourg St.-Maurice	C-2 team
Silver medal – second place	1979 Jonquière	C-2
Silver medal – second place	1979 Jonquière	C-2 team
Silver medal – second place	1983 Meran	C-2
Silver medal – second place	1985 Augsburg	C-2
Silver medal – second place	1985 Augsburg	C-2 team

Pierre Calori is a French slalom canoeist who competed from the late 1970s to the late 1980s. He won seven medals at the ICF Canoe Slalom World Championships with two golds (C-2: 1987; C-2 team: 1987) and five silvers (C-2: 1979, 1983, 1985; C-2 team: 1979, 1985).
