= Claude Neveu =

French slalom canoeist

Medal record

Men's canoe slalom

Representing France

World Championships
Gold medal – first place	1949 Geneva	C-2 team
Gold medal – first place	1951 Steyr	C-2
Gold medal – first place	1951 Steyr	C-2 team
Gold medal – first place	1953 Meran	C-2 team
Gold medal – first place	1955 Tacen	C-2
Silver medal – second place	1949 Geneva	C-2

Claude Neveu was a French slalom canoeist who competed from the late 1940s to the late 1950s. He won six medals at the ICF Canoe Slalom World Championships with five golds (C-2: 1951, 1955; C-2 team: 1949, 1951, 1953) and a silver (C-2: 1949).
