= Günter Grosswig =

East German slalom canoeist

Medal record

Men's canoe slalom

Representing East Germany

World Championships
Silver medal – second place	1955 Tacen	C-2 team
Bronze medal – third place	1957 Augsburg	C-2 team

Günter Grosswig is a retired East German slalom canoeist who competed in the mid-to-late 1950s. He won two medals in the C-2 team event at the ICF Canoe Slalom World Championships with a silver in 1955 and a bronze in 1957.
