= Jochen Förster =

German canoeist (born 1942)

Medal record

Men's canoe slalom

Representing East Germany

World Championships
Gold medal – first place	1971 Meran	C-1 team
Silver medal – second place	1967 Lipno	C-1 team
Bronze medal – third place	1965 Spittal	C-1 team

Jochen Förster (born 7 November 1942, in Zwickau) is a retired East German (now German) slalom canoeist who competed in the 1960s and 1970s. He won three medals in the C-1 team event at the ICF Canoe Slalom World Championships with a gold in 1971, a silver in 1967, and a bronze in 1965. He also finished fourth in the individual C-1 event at the 1972 Summer Olympics in Munich.
