= Manfred Schubert =

Medal record

Men's canoe slalom

Representing East Germany

World Championships
| Gold medal – first place | 1957 Augsburg | C-1 |
| Gold medal – first place | 1961 Hainsberg | C-1 |
| Gold medal – first place | 1963 Spittal | C-1 |
| Gold medal – first place | 1963 Spittal | C-1 team |
| Silver medal – second place | 1955 Tacen | C-1 team |
| Silver medal – second place | 1957 Augsburg | C-1 team |
| Silver medal – second place | 1959 Geneva | C-1 |
| Silver medal – second place | 1959 Geneva | C-1 team |
| Silver medal – second place | 1961 Hainsberg | C-1 team |
| Silver medal – second place | 1967 Lipno | C-1 team |
| Bronze medal – third place | 1965 Spittal | C-1 |
| Bronze medal – third place | 1965 Spittal | C-1 team |

Manfred Schubert is a retired East German slalom canoeist who competed in the 1950s and 1960s. He won twelve medals at the ICF Canoe Slalom World Championships with four golds (C-1: 1957, 1961, 1963; C-1 team: 1963), six silvers (C-1: 1959; C-1 team: 1955, 1957, 1959, 1961, 1967), and two bronzes (C-1: 1965; C-1 team: 1965).
