= Günther Wolkenaer =

West German slalom canoeist

Personal information
- Born: 26.08.1958
- Died: 24.03.2016 (age 57)
Medal record
Men's canoe slalom
Representing West Germany
World Championships
Bronze medal – third place	1985 Augsburg	C-2
Bronze medal – third place	1987 Bourg St.-Maurice	C-2 team

Günther Wolkenaer (August 1958 – March 2016) is a West German slalom canoeist who competed from the late 1970s to the late 1980s. He won two bronze medals at the ICF Canoe Slalom World Championships, earning them in 1985 (C-2) and 1987 (C-2 team).

He died in March 2016 at the age of 57, three days after an accident with a two horse cart in the Dolomites on 21 March.
