= Roland Bardet =

Slalom canoeist

Medal record

Men's canoe slalom

Representing Switzerland

World Championships
Silver medal – second place	1953 Meran	C-1 team
Bronze medal – third place	1955 Tacen	C-1 team
Bronze medal – third place	1959 Geneva	C-1 team

Roland Bardet is a Swiss retired slalom canoeist who competed from the mid-1950s to the mid-1960s. He won three medals in the C-1 team event at the ICF Canoe Slalom World Championships with a silver (1953) and two bronzes (1955, 1959).
