= Olaf Fricke =

German canoeist

Medal record

Men's canoe slalom

Representing West Germany

World Championships
Gold medal – first place	1973 Muotathal	C-2 team

Olaf Fricke (born 1 January 1951 in Zeitz) is a former West German slalom canoeist who competed in the 1970s.

He won a gold medal in the C-2 team event at the 1973 ICF Canoe Slalom World Championships in Muotathal.

Fricke also finished seventh in the C-2 event at the 1972 Summer Olympics in Munich.
