= Steve Garvis =

American slalom canoeist

Medal record

Men's canoe slalom

Representing United States

World Championships
Gold medal – first place	1981 Bala	C-2
Silver medal – second place	1983 Meran	C-2 team
Bronze medal – third place	1981 Bala	C-2 team
Bronze medal – third place	1983 Meran	C-2

Stephen "Steve" Garvis is an American slalom canoeist who competed from the late 1970s to the mid-1980s. As a young man, Steve was a wrestler, as was his brother. In 1976, Steve began to seriously compete with his fraternal twin, Mike Garvis. Together, they came to be known as "The Garvi".

Their first major win was at the 1977 ICF Canoe Slalom World Championships, where they placed fourth. They went on to win four medals at the ICF Canoe Slalom World Championships with a gold (C-2: 1981) a silver (C-2 team: 1983) and two bronzes (C-2: 1983; C-2 team: 1981).

Steve has continued working with youth and Boy Scouts, teaching them about canoeing and camping.
