= Charles Harris (canoeist) =

American canoeist

Medal record

Men's canoe slalom

Representing United States

World Championships
| Silver medal – second place | 1983 Meran | C-2 team |
| Bronze medal – third place | 1985 Augsburg | C-2 team |

Charles Harris is a former American slalom canoeist who competed in the 1980s. He won two medals in the C-2 team event at the ICF Canoe Slalom World Championships with a silver in 1983 and a bronze in 1985.
