= Peter Massalski =

Medal record

Men's canoe slalom

Representing East Germany

World Championships
Gold medal – first place	1977 Spittal	C-1 team
Silver medal – second place	1973 Muotathal	C-1 team
Silver medal – second place	1975 Skopje	C-1 team
Silver medal – second place	1977 Spittal	C-1

Peter Massalski is a former East German slalom canoeist who competed in the 1970s.

He won four medals at the ICF Canoe Slalom World Championships with a gold (C-1 team: 1977) and three silvers (C-1: 1977; C-1 team: 1973, 1975).
