= 1975 ICF Canoe Slalom World Championships =

Canoe slalom event in Skopje, Yugoslavia

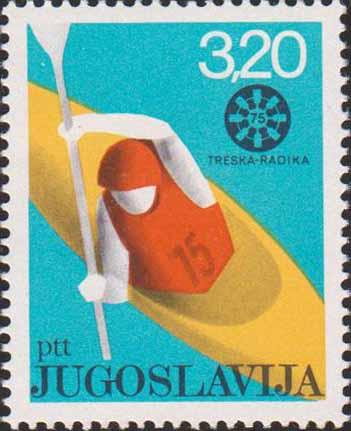
A stamp of Yugoslavia dedicated to the 1975 ICF Canoe Slalom World Championships

The 1975 ICF Canoe Slalom World Championships were held in Skopje, Yugoslavia (in present-day North Macedonia) under the auspices of International Canoe Federation. It was the 14th edition.

== Medal summary ==
=== Men's ===
==== Canoe ====
Event	Gold	Points	Silver	Points	Bronze	Points
C1	Petr Sodomka (TCH)	283.39	Jaroslav Radil (TCH)	291.03	Harald Heinrich (GDR)	293.00
C1 team	Czechoslovakia; Petr Sodomka; Jaroslav Radil; Karel Třešňák	403.27	East Germany; Reinhard Eiben; Peter Massalski; Harald Heinrich	409.46	West Germany; Walter Horn; Dietmar Moos; Dieter Remmlinger	471.65
C2	East Germany; Jürgen Kretschmer; Klaus Trummer	264.45	Poland; Wojciech Kudlik; Jerzy Jeż	265.57	Czechoslovakia; František Kadaňka; Antonín Brabec	276.71
C2 team	East Germany; Walter Hofmann & Rolf-Dieter Amend; Jürgen Kretschmer & Klaus Trummer; Jürgen Henze & Herbert Fischer	329.51	Czechoslovakia; Svetomír Kmošťák & Radomír Halfar; František Kadaňka & Antonín Brabec; Jiří Benhák & Ladislav Benhák	473.43	Poland; Wojciech Kudlik & Jerzy Jeż; Maciej Rychta & Zbigniew Leśniak; Jan Frączek & Ryszard Seruga	493.28

==== Kayak ====
Event	Gold	Points	Silver	Points	Bronze	Points
K1	Siegbert Horn (GDR)	211.18	Ulrich Peters (FRG)	214.08	Harald Gimpel (GDR)	217.18
K1 team	West Germany; Ulrich Peters; Bernd Dichtl; Dieter Förstl	247.62	Poland; Stanisław Majerczak; Jerzy Stanuch; Wojciech Gawroński	291.79	East Germany; Siegbert Horn; Harald Gimpel; Christian Döring	297.62

=== Mixed ===
==== Canoe ====
Event	Gold	Points	Silver	Points	Bronze	Points
C2	United States; Marietta Gillman; Chuck Lyda	392.71	United States; Rasa Dentremont; George Lhota	644.44	United States; Mikki Piras; Steve Draper	651.01

=== Women's ===
==== Kayak ====
Event	Gold	Points	Silver	Points	Bronze	Points
K1	Maria Ćwiertniewicz (POL)	269.83	Ulrike Deppe (FRG)	290.67	Angelika Bahmann (GDR)	293.45
K1 team	Switzerland; Elisabeth Käser; Danielle Kamber; Cornelia Bachofner	423.47	East Germany; Angelika Bahmann; Petra Krol; Marion Bauman	430.35	Czechoslovakia; Ludmila Polesná; Bohumila Kapplová; Jana Kubovčáková	463.29

== Medals table ==
Rank	Nation	Gold	Silver	Bronze	Total
1	East Germany (GDR)	3	2	4	9
2	Czechoslovakia (TCH)	2	2	2	6
3	Poland (POL)	1	2	1	4
3	West Germany (FRG)	1	2	1	4
5	United States (USA)	1	1	1	3
6	Switzerland (SUI)	1	0	0	1
Totals (6 entries)		9	9	9	27
