= Dieter Remmlinger =

Medal record

Men's canoe slalom

Representing West Germany

World Championships
Bronze medal – third place	1975 Skopje	C-1 team

Dieter Remmlinger is a former West German slalom canoeist who competed in the 1970s. He won a bronze medal in the C-1 team event at the 1975 ICF Canoe Slalom World Championships in Skopje.
