= Gert Kleinert =

Medal record

Men's canoe slalom

Representing East Germany

World Championships
Gold medal – first place	1963 Spittal	C-1 team
Gold medal – first place	1965 Spittal	C-1
Silver medal – second place	1957 Augsburg	C-1 team
Silver medal – second place	1959 Geneva	C-1 team
Silver medal – second place	1961 Hainsberg	C-1 team
Silver medal – second place	1963 Spittal	C-1
Bronze medal – third place	1965 Spittal	C-1 team

Gert Kleinert is a retired East German slalom canoeist who competed in the 1950s and the 1960s. He won seven medals at the ICF Canoe Slalom World Championships with two golds (C-1: 1965, C-1 team: 1963), four silvers (C-1: 1963; C-1 team: 1957, 1959, 1961) and a bronze (C-1 team: 1965).
