= Dieter Welsink =

German canoeist

Medal record

Men's canoe slalom

Representing West Germany

World Championships
Gold medal – first place	1979 Jonquière	C-2
Silver medal – second place	1981 Bala	C-2

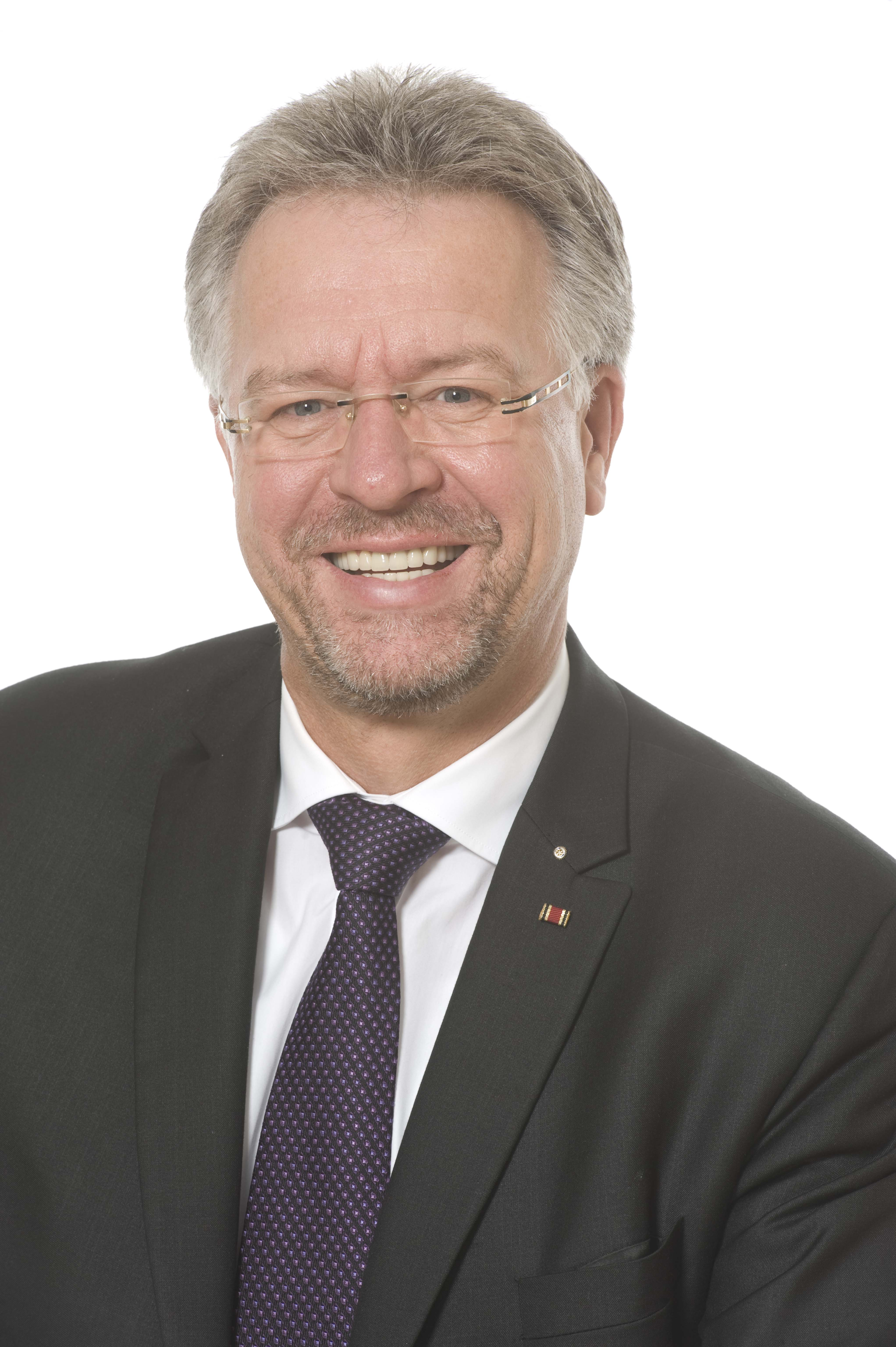
Dieter Wilsink

Dieter Welsink is a former West German slalom canoeist who competed from the mid-1970s to the early 1980s. He won two medals in the C-2 event at the ICF Canoe Slalom World Championships with a gold in 1979 and a silver in 1981.
