= Karl-Heinz Scheffer =

Medal record

Men's canoe slalom

Representing West Germany

World Championships
Gold medal – first place	1969 Bourg St.-Maurice	C-2 team
Gold medal – first place	1973 Muotathal	C-2 team
Silver medal – second place	1971 Meran	C-2 team
Bronze medal – third place	1967 Lipno	C-2 team

Karl-Heinz Scheffer is a former West German slalom canoeist who competed from the late 1960s to the mid-1970s.

He won four medals in the C-2 team event at the ICF Canoe Slalom World Championships with two golds (1969, 1973), a silver (1971) and a bronze (1967).
