= Jiří Dejl =

Medal record

Men's canoe slalom

Representing Czechoslovakia

World Championships
Silver medal – second place	1965 Spittal	C-2
Silver medal – second place	1969 Bourg St.-Maurice	C-2 team

Jiří Dejl (born 7 November 1938) is a Czech retired slalom canoeist who competed for Czechoslovakia in the 1960s. He won two silver medals at the ICF Canoe Slalom World Championships, earning them in 1965 (C-2) and 1969 (C-2 team).
