= Herbert Fischer (canoeist) =

East German canoeist

Medal record

Men's canoe slalom

Representing East Germany

World Championships
Gold medal – first place	1975 Skopje	C-2 team

Herbert Fischer (born 16 April 1951 in Trebnitz) is a former East German slalom canoeist who competed in the 1970s. He won a gold medal in the C-2 team event at the 1975 in Skopje.

Fischer also finished 18th in the C-2 event at the 1972 Summer Olympics in Munich.
