= Hermann Roock =

German canoeist

Medal record

Men's canoe slalom

Representing West Germany

World Championships
Gold medal – first place	1969 Bourg St.-Maurice	C-2 team
Silver medal – second place	1963 Spittal	C-2 team
Bronze medal – third place	1965 Spittal	C-2 team

Hermann Roock is a former West German slalom canoeist who competed from the late 1950s to the late 1960s.

He won a three medals in the C-2 team event at the ICF Canoe Slalom World Championships with a gold in 1969, a silver in 1963 and a bronze in 1965.
