= Jürgen Köhler =

East German canoeist

Medal record

Men's canoe slalom

Representing East Germany

World Championships
Gold medal – first place	1971 Meran	C-1 team
Silver medal – second place	1967 Lipno	C-1 team
Bronze medal – third place	1973 Muotathal	C-2 team

Jürgen Köhler (born 22 February 1946, in Leipzig) is a former East German slalom canoeist who competed in the 1960s and 1970s. He won three medals at the ICF Canoe Slalom World Championships with a gold (C-1 team: 1971), a silver (C-1 team: 1967) and a bronze (C-2 team: 1973).

Köhler also finished sixth in the C-1 event at the 1972 Summer Olympics in Munich.
