= 1967 ICF Canoe Slalom World Championships =

Canoe slalom event in Lipno nad Vltavou, Czechoslovakia

The 1967 ICF Canoe Slalom World Championships were held in Lipno nad Vltavou, Czechoslovakia under the auspices of International Canoe Federation. It was the 10th edition. The mixed C2 team event was not held after having been done so at the previous championships.

== Medal summary ==
=== Men's ===
==== Canoe ====
Event	Gold	Points	Silver	Points	Bronze	Points
C1	Wolfgang Peters (FRG)	318.05	Harald Cuypers (FRG)	340.57	Karel Kumpfmüller (TCH)	341.92
C1 team	Czechoslovakia; Petr Sodomka; Karel Kumpfmüller; Bohuslav Pospíchal	519.07	East Germany; Jochen Förster; Manfred Schubert; Jürgen Köhler	566.00	West Germany; Harald Cuypers; Wolfgang Peters; Otto Stumpf	678.85
C2	Czechoslovakia; Miroslav Stach; Zdeněk Valenta	279.99	Czechoslovakia; Gabriel Janoušek; Milan Horyna	293.26	Czechoslovakia; Ladislav Měšťan; Zdeněk Měšťan	300.40
C2 team	East Germany; Günther Merkel & Manfred Merkel; Ulrich Hippauf & Willi Landers; Jürgen Noak & Siegfried Lück	416.68	Czechoslovakia; Zdeněk Valenta & Miroslav Stach; Gabriel Janoušek & Milan Horyna; Ladislav Měšťan & Zdeněk Měšťan	420.15	West Germany; Manfred Heß & Wolfgang Wenzel; Karl-Heinz Scheffer & Heinz-Jürgen Steinschulte; Klaus Nenninger & Gere Glück	525.57

==== Kayak ====
Event	Gold	Points	Silver	Points	Bronze	Points
K1	Jürgen Bremer (GDR)	272.56	David Mitchell (GBR)	284.90	Hans Hunziker (SUI)	285.05
K1 team	East Germany; Jürgen Bremer; Volkmar Fleischer; Christian Döring	392.02	West Germany; Herbert Beck; Gunter Trojovsky; Eugen Weimann	432.12	France; Claude Lutz; Jean-Louis Olry; Claude Peschier	467.54

=== Mixed ===
==== Canoe ====
Event	Gold	Points	Silver	Points	Bronze	Points
C2	Czechoslovakia; Jaroslava Krčálová; Milan Svoboda	367.65	East Germany; Erika Uhlig; Horst Wängler	391.26	East Germany; Edith Grabo; Uwe Franz	395.06

=== Women's ===
==== Kayak ====
Event	Gold	Points	Silver	Points	Bronze	Points
K1	Ludmila Polesná (TCH)	326.68	Lia Merkel (GDR)	347.03	Bärbel Richter (GDR)	360.47
K1 team	East Germany; Dagmar Sickert; Helga Luber; Bärbel Richter	870.90	Czechoslovakia; Ludmila Polesná; Bohumila Kapplová; Jana Zvěřinová	876.64	West Germany; Bärbel Körner; Kirsten Stumpf; Heide Schröter	938.35

== Medals table ==
Rank	Nation	Gold	Silver	Bronze	Total
1	Czechoslovakia (TCH)	4	3	2	9
1	East Germany (GDR)	4	3	2	9
3	West Germany (FRG)	1	2	3	6
4	Great Britain (GBR)	0	1	0	1
5	France (FRA)	0	0	1	1
5	Switzerland (SUI)	0	0	1	1
Totals (6 entries)		9	9	9	27
