= Ondřej Mohout =

Medal record

Men's canoe slalom

Representing Czechoslovakia

World Championships
Gold medal – first place	1985 Augsburg	C2 team
Silver medal – second place	1987 Bourg St.-Maurice	C2 team

Ondřej Mohout (born 1959) is a former Czechoslovak slalom canoeist who competed at the international level from 1984 to 1990.

He won two medals in the C2 team event at the ICF Canoe Slalom World Championships with a gold in 1985 and a silver in 1987.

His partner in the C2 boat from 1984 to 1989 was Viktor Beneš.
