= Václav Nič =

Medal record

Men's canoe slalom

Representing Czechoslovakia

World Championships
Gold medal – first place	1951 Steyr	C-1 team
Silver medal – second place	1949 Geneva	C-2 team
Silver medal – second place	1951 Steyr	C-2 team
Silver medal – second place	1953 Meran	C-1
Silver medal – second place	1953 Meran	C-2
Bronze medal – third place	1961 Hainsberg	Mixed C-2

Václav Nič is a retired Czechoslovak slalom canoeist who competed from the late 1940s to the early 1960s. He won six medals at the ICF Canoe Slalom World Championships with a gold (C-1 team: 1951), four silvers (C-1, C-2: both 1953, C-2 team: 1949, 1951) and a bronze (Mixed C-2: 1961).
