= 1955 ICF Canoe Slalom World Championships =

Canoe slalom event in Tacen, Yugoslavia

The 1955 ICF Canoe Slalom World Championships were held in Tacen, Yugoslavia (now in Slovenia) under the auspices of International Canoe Federation. It was the 4th edition. The Mixed C2 event debuted at these championships.

== Medal summary ==
=== Men's ===
==== Canoe ====
Event	Gold	Points	Silver	Points	Bronze	Points
C1	Vladimír Jirásek (TCH)	244.0	Luděk Beneš (TCH)	262.0	Karl-Heinz Wozniak (GDR)	284.5
C1 team	Czechoslovakia; Vladimír Jirásek; Jiří Hradil; Luděk Beneš	362.0	East Germany; Karl-Heinz Wozniak; Dieter Fritzsche; Manfred Schubert	617.5	Switzerland; Roland Bardet; Jean-Claude Tochon; Robert Inhelder	858.0
C2	France; Claude Neveu; Roger Paris	270.9	East Germany; Dieter Friedrich; Horst Kleinert	272.2	Czechoslovakia; František Hrabě; Jiří Kotana	285.3
C2 team	Czechoslovakia; František Hrabě & Jiří Kotana; Vladimír Lánský & Josef Hendrych; Rudolf Flégr & Milan Řehoř	409.7	East Germany; Dieter Friedrich & Horst Kleinert; Dieter Göthe & Helmut Weise; Franz Brendel & Günter Grosswig	515.8	Austria; Wolfram Steinwendtner & Bruno Kerbl; Harry Jarosch & Eduard Haider; Alfred Falkner & Richard Schauer	718.9

==== Kayak ====
Event	Gold	Points	Silver	Points	Bronze	Points
Folding K1	Sigi Holzbauer (FRG)	223.5	Miloslav Duffek (SUI)	231.2	Jože Ilija (YUG)	243.0
Folding K1 team	West Germany; Manfred Vogt; Sigi Holzbauer; Alois Würfmannsdobler	326.6	Austria; Robert Fabian; Rudolf Klepp; Eduard Radelspöck	395.0	Czechoslovakia; Dimitrij Skolil; Vladimír Cibák; Zdeněk Matějovský	402.2

=== Mixed ===
==== Canoe ====
Event	Gold	Points	Silver	Points	Bronze	Points
C2	Czechoslovakia; Dana Martanová; Jiří Pecka	396.1	France; Simone Gavinet; René Gavinet	461.1	Czechoslovakia; Jarmila Pacherová; Miroslav Čihák	505.0

=== Women's ===
==== Kayak ====
Event	Gold	Points	Silver	Points	Bronze	Points
Folding K1	Rosemarie Biesinger (FRG)	350.5	Karin Tietze (GDR)	353.4	Eva Setzkorn (GDR)	373.0
Folding K1 team	East Germany; Eva Setzkorn; Elfriede Hugo; Karin Tietze	574.0	West Germany; Rosemarie Biesinger; Anni Reifinger; Hanni Schulte	696.1	Czechoslovakia; Jaroslava Havlová; Květa Havlová; Renata Knýová	

== Medals table ==
Rank	Nation	Gold	Silver	Bronze	Total
1	Czechoslovakia (TCH)	4	1	4	9
2	West Germany (FRG)	3	1	0	4
3	East Germany (GDR)	1	4	2	7
4	France (FRA)	1	1	0	2
5	Austria (AUT)	0	1	1	2
5	Switzerland (SUI)	0	1	1	2
7	Yugoslavia (YUG)	0	0	1	1
Totals (7 entries)		9	9	9	27
