= Henri Kadrnka =

Medal record

Men's canoe slalom

Representing Switzerland

World Championships
Silver medal – second place	1957 Augsburg	C-2 team
Bronze medal – third place	1959 Geneva	C-2 team

Henri Kadrnka is a retired Yugoslav-Swiss slalom canoeist who competed from the mid-1950s to the early 1960s. He won two medals in the C-2 team event at the ICF Canoe Slalom World Championships with a silver in 1957 and a bronze in 1959.
