= Maciej Rychta =

Polish canoeist

Medal record

Men's canoe slalom

Representing Poland

World Championships
Bronze medal – third place	1975 Skopje	C-2 team
Bronze medal – third place	1977 Spittal	C-2 team

Maciej Rychta (born February 25, 1951, in Nowy Sącz) is a Polish slalom canoeist who competed in the 1970s. He won two bronze medals in the C-2 team event at the ICF Canoe Slalom World Championships, earning them in 1975 and 1977. He also finished 17th in the C-2 event at the 1972 Summer Olympics in Munich.
