= Josef Hendrych =

Czechoslovak canoeist

Medal record

Men's canoe slalom

Representing Czechoslovakia

World Championships
Gold medal – first place	1955 Tacen	C-2 team
Gold medal – first place	1957 Augsburg	C-2 team
Silver medal – second place	1957 Augsburg	C-2
Silver medal – second place	1959 Geneva	C-2
Silver medal – second place	1959 Geneva	C-2 team
Silver medal – second place	1961 Hainsberg	C-2 team
Bronze medal – third place	1953 Meran	C-2 team

Josef Hendrych is a retired Czechoslovak slalom canoeist who competed in the 1950s and the 1960s. He won seven medals at the ICF Canoe Slalom World Championships with two golds (C-2 team: 1955, 1957), four silvers (C-2: 1957, 1959; C-2 team: 1959, 1961) and a bronze (C-2 team: 1953).
