= Fredi Zimmermann =

West German slalom canoeist

Medal record

Men's canoe slalom

Representing West Germany

World Championships
Bronze medal – third place	1981 Bala	C-1 team
Bronze medal – third place	1985 Augsburg	C-2
Bronze medal – third place	1987 Bourg St.-Maurice	C-2 team

Fredi Zimmermann is a West German slalom canoeist who competed from the late 1970s to the late 1980s. He won three bronze medals at the ICF Canoe Slalom World Championships, earning them in 1981 (C-1 team), 1985 (C-2) and 1987 (C-2 team).
