= Harald Cuypers =

German canoeist

Medal record

Men's canoe slalom

Representing West Germany

World Championships
Gold medal – first place	1969 Bourg St.-Maurice	C-1 team
Silver medal – second place	1967 Lipno	C-1
Silver medal – second place	1971 Meran	C-1 team
Bronze medal – third place	1967 Lipno	C-1 team

Harald Cuypers is a West German retired slalom canoeist who competed in the 1960s and 1970s. He won four medals at the ICF Canoe Slalom World Championships with a gold (C-1 team: 1969), two silvers (C-1: 1967, C-1 team: 1971) and a bronze (1967).
