= Zdeněk Valenta =

Medal record

Men's canoe slalom

Representing Czechoslovakia

World Championships
Gold medal – first place	1967 Lipno	C-2
Silver medal – second place	1961 Hainsberg	C-2
Silver medal – second place	1961 Hainsberg	C-2 team
Silver medal – second place	1967 Lipno	C-2 team
Silver medal – second place	1969 Bourg St.-Maurice	C-2 team
Bronze medal – third place	1969 Bourg St.-Maurice	C-2

Zdeněk Valenta is a Czechoslovak retired slalom canoeist who competed in the 1960s. He won six medals at the ICF Canoe Slalom World Championships with a gold (C-2: 1967), four silvers (C-2: 1961; C-2 team: 1961, 1967, 1969) and a bronze (C-2: 1969).
