= Robin Williams (canoeist) =

British slalom canoeist

Medal record

Men's canoe slalom

Representing Great Britain

World Championships
Gold medal – first place	1981 Bala	C-2 team
Bronze medal – third place	1983 Meran	C-2 team

Robin Williams is a British slalom canoeist who competed in the 1980s. He won two medals in the C-2 team event at the ICF Canoe Slalom World Championships with a gold in 1981 and a bronze in 1983.
