= Pierre d'Alençon =

French canoeist

Medal record

Men's canoe slalom

Representing France

World Championships
Gold medal – first place	1949 Geneva	C-1
Gold medal – first place	1949 Geneva	C-1 team
Gold medal – first place	1951 Steyr	C-2 team
Gold medal – first place	1953 Meran	C-2 team
Bronze medal – third place	1953 Meran	C-2

Pierre d'Alençon is a French retired slalom canoeist who competed from the late 1940s to the mid-1950s. He won five medals at the ICF Canoe Slalom World Championships with four golds (C-1: 1949; C-1 team: 1949; C-2 team: 1951, 1953) and a bronze (C-2: 1953). He was from Paris.
