= John Harris (slalom canoeist) =

American canoeist

Medal record

Men's canoe slalom

Representing United States

World Championships
Silver medal – second place	1983 Meran	C-2 team
Bronze medal – third place	1985 Augsburg	C-2 team

John Harris (born 1959) is a former American slalom canoeist who competed in the 1980s. He won two medals in the C-2 team event at the ICF Canoe Slalom World Championships with a silver in 1983 and a bronze in 1985.
