= Ladislav Benhák =

Czechoslovak slalom canoeist

Medal record

Men's slalom canoeing

Representing Czechoslovakia

World Championships
Gold medal – first place	1977 Spittal	C-2 team
Silver medal – second place	1975 Skopje	C-2 team

Ladislav Benhák is a former Czechoslovak slalom canoeist who competed from the mid-1970s to the early 1980s. He won two medals in the C-2 team event at the ICF Canoe Slalom World Championships with a gold in 1977 and a silver in 1975.
