= Martin Wyss =

Medal record

Men's canoe slalom

Representing Switzerland

World Championships
| Silver medal – second place | 1977 Spittal | C-2 team |
| Bronze medal – third place | 1979 Jonquière | C-2 team |

Martin Wyss is a former Swiss slalom canoeist who competed in the 1970s. He won two medals in the C-2 team event at the ICF Canoe Slalom World Championships with a silver in 1977 and a bronze in 1979.
