= Daniel Goodard =

British canoeist

Medal record

Men's canoe slalom

Representing Great Britain

World Championships
Bronze medal – third place	2006 Prague	C-1 team

Daniel Goodard is a British slalom canoeist who competed in the 2000s. He won a bronze medal in the C-1 team event at the 2006 ICF Canoe Slalom World Championships in Prague.
