= Jean-Claude Tochon =

Swiss canoeist

Medal record

Men's canoe slalom

Representing Switzerland

World Championships
Bronze medal – third place	1955 Tacen	C-1 team
Bronze medal – third place	1957 Augsburg	C-1
Bronze medal – third place	1959 Geneva	C-1 team
Bronze medal – third place	1961 Hainsberg	C-1 team
Bronze medal – third place	1963 Spittal	C-1
Bronze medal – third place	1963 Spittal	C-1 team

Jean-Claude Tochon is a Swiss retired slalom canoeist who competed in the 1950s and the 1960s. He won six bronze medals at the ICF Canoe Slalom World Championships (C-1: 1957, 1963; C-1 team: 1955, 1959, 1961, 1963).
