= Wolfgang Peters (canoeist) =

West German slalom canoeist

Medal record

Men's canoe slalom

Representing West Germany

World Championships
Gold medal – first place	1967 Lipno	C-1
Gold medal – first place	1969 Bourg St.-Maurice	C-1
Gold medal – first place	1969 Bourg St.-Maurice	C-1 team
Silver medal – second place	1971 Meran	C-1 team
Bronze medal – third place	1967 Lipno	C-1 team
Bronze medal – third place	1973 Muotathal	C-1 team

Wolfgang Peters (born 3 July 1948 in Schwerte, North Rhine-Westphalia) is a former West German slalom canoeist who competed from the late 1960s to the mid-1970s. He won six medals at the ICF Canoe Slalom World Championships with three golds (C-1: 1967, 1969; C-1 team: 1969), a silver (C-1 team: 1971) and two bronzes (C-1 team: 1967, 1973).

Peters also finished fifth in the C-1 event at the 1972 Summer Olympics in Munich.

His daughter Violetta won a bronze medal in the women's K-1 event at the 2008 Summer Olympics in Beijing representing Austria. His brother Ulrich is also a former slalom canoeist.
