= Jürgen Kretschmer =

East German slalom canoeist

Medal record

Men's canoe slalom

Representing East Germany

World Championships
Gold medal – first place	1971 Meran	C-2
Gold medal – first place	1971 Meran	C-2 team
Gold medal – first place	1975 Skopje	C-2
Gold medal – first place	1975 Skopje	C-2 team
Silver medal – second place	1973 Muotathal	C-2
Bronze medal – third place	1973 Muotathal	C-2 team

Jürgen Kretschmer (born 4 December 1947 in Zeitz) is a former East German slalom canoeist who competed in the early to mid-1970s. He won six medals at the ICF Canoe Slalom World Championships with four golds (C-2: 1971, 1975; C-2 team:1971, 1975), a silver (C-2: 1973) and a bronze (C-2 team: 1973).

Kretschmer also finished fourth in the C-2 event at the 1972 Summer Olympics in Munich.
