= Zbigniew Czaja =

Polish slalom canoeist

Medal record

Men's canoe slalom

Representing Poland

World Championships
Gold medal – first place	1979 Jonquière	C-2 team
Silver medal – second place	1981 Bala	C-2 team

Zbigniew Czaja is a former Polish slalom canoeist who competed from the mid-1970s to the mid-1980s.

He won two medals in the C-2 team event at the ICF Canoe Slalom World Championships with a gold in 1979 and a silver in 1981.
