= Vladimír Lánský =

Czechoslovak canoeist

Medal record

Men's canoe slalom

Representing Czechoslovakia

World Championships
Gold medal – first place	1955 Tacen	C-2 team
Silver medal – second place	1959 Geneva	C-2 team
Silver medal – second place	1961 Hainsberg	C-2 team

Vladimír Lánský is a former Czechoslovak slalom canoeist who competed in the 1950s and the 1960s. He won three medals in the C-2 team event at the ICF Canoe Slalom World Championships with a gold (1955) and two silvers (1959, 1961).
