= Jiří Kotana =

Medal record

Men's canoe slalom

Representing Czechoslovakia

World Championships
Gold medal – first place	1955 Tacen	C-2 team
Gold medal – first place	1957 Augsburg	C-2 team
Bronze medal – third place	1955 Tacen	C-2
Bronze medal – third place	1957 Augsburg	C-2

Jiří Kotana is a retired Czechoslovak slalom canoeist who competed in the mid-to-late 1950s. He won four medals at the ICF Canoe Slalom World Championships with two golds (C-2 team: 1955, 1957) and two bronzes (C-2: 1955, 1957) .
