= Mike Garvis =

American canoeist

Medal record

Men's canoe slalom

Representing United States

World Championships
Gold medal – first place	1981 Bala	C-2
Silver medal – second place	1983 Meran	C-2 team
Bronze medal – third place	1981 Bala	C-2 team
Bronze medal – third place	1983 Meran	C-2
Bronze medal – third place	1985 Augsburg	C-2 team

Mike Garvis is an American slalom canoeist who competed from the late 1970s to the mid-1980s. He won five medals at the ICF Canoe Slalom World Championships with a gold (C-2: 1981), a silver (C-2 team: 1983) and three bronzes (C-2 team: 1981, 1983, 1985). He was on a team with his brother Steve Garvis.
