= Jan Pecka =

Medal record

Men's canoe slalom

Representing Czechoslovakia

World Championships
Gold medal – first place	1951 Steyr	C-1 team
Bronze medal – third place	1953 Meran	C-2 team

Jan Pecka is a former Czechoslovak slalom canoeist who competed in the 1950s. He won two medals at the ICF Canoe Slalom World Championships with a gold (C-1 team: 1951) and a bronze (C-2 team: 1953).
