= Bruno Kerbl =

Austrian Canoeist

Medal record

Men's canoe slalom

Representing Austria

World Championships
Bronze medal – third place	1955 Tacen	C-2 team
Bronze medal – third place	1963 Spittal	C-2 team

Bruno Kerbl is an Austrian retired slalom canoeist who competed from the mid-1950s to the mid-1960s. He won two bronze medals in the C-2 team event at the ICF Canoe Slalom World Championships, earning them in 1955 and 1963.
