= Jaroslav Radil =

Medal record

Men's canoe slalom

Representing Czechoslovakia

World Championships
Gold medal – first place	1973 Muotathal	C-1 team
Gold medal – first place	1975 Skopje	C-1 team
Silver medal – second place	1975 Skopje	C-1
Bronze medal – third place	1977 Spittal	C-1 team

Jaroslav Radil is a former Czechoslovak slalom canoeist who competed in the 1970s. He won four medals at the ICF Canoe Slalom World Championships with two golds (C-1 team: 1973, 1975), a silver (C-1: 1975) and a bronze (C-1 team: 1977).
