= Günther Merkel =

East German slalom canoeist

Medal record

Men's canoe slalom

Representing East Germany

World Championships
Gold medal – first place	1961 Hainsberg	C-2
Gold medal – first place	1961 Hainsberg	C-2 team
Gold medal – first place	1963 Spittal	C-2
Gold medal – first place	1963 Spittal	C-2 team
Gold medal – first place	1965 Spittal	C-2
Gold medal – first place	1967 Lipno	C-2 team
Silver medal – second place	1959 Geneva	Mixed C-2

Günther Merkel is a retired East German slalom canoeist who competed from the late 1950s to the late 1960s. He won seven medals at the ICF Canoe Slalom World Championships with six golds (C-2: 1961, 1963, 1965, C-2 team: 1961, 1963, 1967) and a silver (Mixed C-2: 1959).

== See also ==
- Manfred Merkel
