= Robert Zürcher =

Swiss canoeist

Medal record

Men's canoe slalom

Representing Switzerland

World Championships
Silver medal – second place	1957 Augsburg	C-2 team
Bronze medal – third place	1959 Geneva	C-2 team
Bronze medal – third place	1961 Hainsberg	C-2 team

Robert Zürcher is a Swiss retired slalom canoeist who competed from the late 1950s to the mid-1960s. He won three medals in the C-2 team event at the ICF Canoe Slalom World Championships with a silver (1957) and two bronzes (1959, 1961).
