= Russ Nichols =

American canoeist (born 1947)

Clayton W. "Russ" Nichols (born May 30, 1947, Glen Cove, New York) is an American retired slalom canoeist who competed in the 1970s. He finished 14th in the C-2 event at the 1972 Summer Olympics in Munich.
