= Václav Janovský =

Medal record

Men's canoe slalom

Representing Czechoslovakia

World Championships
Gold medal – first place	1959 Geneva	C-1 team

Václav Janovský is a former Czechoslovak slalom canoeist who competed in the 1950s and 1960s. He won a gold medal in the C-1 team event at the 1959 ICF Canoe Slalom World Championships in Geneva.
