= Horst Kleinert =

German canoeist

Medal record

Men's canoe slalom

Representing East Germany

World Championships
Gold medal – first place	1957 Augsburg	C-2
Gold medal – first place	1959 Geneva	C-2
Gold medal – first place	1959 Geneva	C-2 team
Gold medal – first place	1961 Hainsberg	C-2 team
Silver medal – second place	1955 Tacen	C-2
Silver medal – second place	1955 Tacen	C-2 team
Bronze medal – third place	1957 Augsburg	C-2 team
Bronze medal – third place	1961 Hainsberg	C-2

Horst Kleinert is a retired East German slalom canoeist who competed from the mid-1950s to the early 1960s. He won eight medals at the ICF Canoe Slalom World Championships with four golds (C-2: 1957, 1959; C-2 team: 1959, 1961), two silvers (C-2: 1955, C-2 team: 1955) and a bronze (C-2: 1961, C-2 team: 1957).
