= Vladimír Jirásek =

Czechoslovak slalom canoeist

Medal record

Men's canoe slalom

Representing Czechoslovakia

World Championships
| Gold medal – first place | 1953 Meran | C-1 team |
| Gold medal – first place | 1955 Tacen | C-1 |
| Gold medal – first place | 1955 Tacen | C-1 team |
| Gold medal – first place | 1959 Geneva | C-1 |
| Gold medal – first place | 1959 Geneva | C-1 team |
| Bronze medal – third place | 1953 Meran | C-1 |
| Bronze medal – third place | 1957 Augsburg | C-1 team |

Vladimír Jirásek (2 November 1933 in Hrádek – 14 May 2018) was a Czech slalom canoeist who competed from the mid-1950s to the mid-1960s for Czechoslovakia. He won seven medals at the ICF Canoe Slalom World Championships with five golds (C-1: 1955, 1959; C-1 team: 1953, 1955, 1959) and two bronzes (C-1: 1953, C-1 team: 1957).
