= Jordi Domenjó =

Spanish canoeist

Medal record

Men's canoe slalom

Representing Spain

World Championships
Bronze medal – third place	2009 La Seu d'Urgell	C1 team
Bronze medal – third place	2010 Tacen	C1

European Championships
Bronze medal – third place	2000 Mezzana	C1 team

Jordi Domenjó (born 1979) is a Spanish slalom canoeist who competed at the international level from 1995 to 2015.

He won two bronze medals at the ICF Canoe Slalom World Championships. One in the C1 event (2010) and the other one in the C1 team event (2009). He also won a bronze medal in the C1 team event at the 2000 European Championships in Mezzana.

== World Cup individual podiums ==
Season	Date	Venue	Position	Event
2012	23 Jun 2012	La Seu d'Urgell	1st	C1
