= Rudolf Flégr =

Medal record

Men's canoe slalom

Representing Czechoslovakia

World Championships
Gold medal – first place	1955 Tacen	C-2 team
Gold medal – first place	1957 Augsburg	C-2 team

Rudolf Flégr is a former slalom canoeist who competed for Czechoslovakia in the 1950s. He won two gold medals in the C-2 team event at the ICF Canoe Slalom World Championships, earning them in 1955 and 1957.
