= Luděk Beneš =

Czech slalom canoeist (1937–2016)

Medal record

Men's canoe slalom

Representing Czechoslovakia

World Championships
| Gold medal – first place | 1955 Tacen | C1 team |
| Gold medal – first place | 1959 Geneva | C1 team |
| Gold medal – first place | 1965 Spittal | C1 team |
| Silver medal – second place | 1955 Tacen | C1 |
| Silver medal – second place | 1965 Spittal | C1 |
| Bronze medal – third place | 1957 Augsburg | C1 team |

Luděk Beneš (7 September 1937 – 9 August 2016) was a Czech slalom canoeist who competed for Czechoslovakia from the mid-1950s to the mid-1960s, specializing in the C1 discipline. He won six medals at the ICF Canoe Slalom World Championships with three golds (C1 team: 1955, 1959, 1965), two silvers (C1: 1955, 1965) and a bronze (C1 team: 1957).

== Biography ==
Beneš was born on 7 September 1937. He was born in a hospital in Plzeň, but was native of the nearby town of Blovice. In addition to his international successes, he is also a 12-time champion of Czechoslovakia. From 1967 to 1972, he was the coach of the Czechoslovak Olympic team. He then worked as a pharmacist in a pharmacy in Blovice that belonged to his family. He died on 9 August 2016 at the age of 78.
