= Dieter Göthe =

German canoeist

Medal record

Men's canoe slalom

Representing East Germany

World Championships
Gold medal – first place	1959 Geneva	C-2 team
Silver medal – second place	1955 Tacen	C-2 team
Bronze medal – third place	1957 Augsburg	C-2 team
Bronze medal – third place	1959 Geneva	C-2

Dieter Göthe is a retired East German slalom canoeist who competed from the mid-1950s to the early 1960s. He won four medals at the ICF Canoe Slalom World Championships with a gold (C-2 team: 1959), a silver (C-2 team: 1955) and two bronzes (C-2: 1959, C-2 team: 1957).
