= Pierre Biehler =

Medal record

Men's canoe slalom

Representing France

World Championships
Silver medal – second place	1951 Steyr	C-1 team
Bronze medal – third place	1953 Meran	C-1 team

Pierre Biehler is a French retired slalom canoeist who competed in the early-to-mid 1950s. He won two medals in the C-1 team event at the ICF Canoe Slalom World Championships with a silver in 1951 and a bronze in 1953.
