= Wojciech Kudlik =

Polish canoeist

Medal record

Men's canoe slalom

Representing Poland

World Championships
Gold medal – first place	1979 Jonquière	C-2 team
Silver medal – second place	1975 Skopje	C-2
Silver medal – second place	1981 Bala	C-2 team
Bronze medal – third place	1975 Skopje	C-2 team
Bronze medal – third place	1977 Spittal	C-2 team
Bronze medal – third place	1979 Jonquière	C-2

Wojciech Kudlik (born 5 January 1954 in Nowy Sącz) is a former Polish slalom canoeist who competed in the 1970s and the 1980s.

He won two medals in the C-2 event at the ICF Canoe Slalom World Championships with a silver in 1975 and a bronze in 1979. He also won four medals in the C-2 team event with a gold (1979), a silver (1981) and two bronzes (1975, 1977).

Kudlik finished 13th in the C-2 event at the 1972 Summer Olympics in Munich.
