= Jürgen Schnitzerling =

Medal record

Men's canoe slalom

Representing West Germany

World Championships
Silver medal – second place	1979 Jonquière	C-1 team
Bronze medal – third place	1981 Bala	C-1 team

Jürgen Schnitzerling is a former West German slalom canoeist who competed from the late 1970s to the mid-1980s. He won two medals in the C-1 team event at the ICF Canoe Slalom World Championships with a silver in 1979 and a bronze in 1981.
