= Viktor Beneš =

Czechoslovak-Slovak slalom canoeist (born 1961)

Personal information
- Born: 1961 (age 64–65)
- Years active: 1984-1993

Sport
- Country: Slovakia
- Sport: Canoe slalom
- Event: C2
Medal record
Men's canoe slalom
World Championships
Representing Czechoslovakia
Gold medal – first place	1985 Augsburg	C2 team
Silver medal – second place	1987 Bourg St.-Maurice	C2 team
Silver medal – second place	1991 Tacen	C2 team
Representing Slovakia
Bronze medal – third place	1993 Mezzana	C2 team

Viktor Beneš (born 1961) is a Czechoslovak-Slovak slalom canoeist who competed at the international level from 1984 to 1993.

He won four medals in the C2 team event at the ICF Canoe Slalom World Championships with a gold (1985) and two silvers (1987, 1991) for Czechoslovakia and a bronze (1993) for Slovakia.

His partner in the C2 boat from 1984 to 1989 was Ondřej Mohout. From 1991 to 1993 he paddled with Milan Kučera.

== Career statistics ==
=== Major championships results timeline ===
Representing Czechoslovakia from 1985 to 1992 and Slovakia in 1993.

Event		1985	1986	1987	1988	1989	1990	1991	1992	1993
World Championships	C2	7	Not held	12	Not held	—	Not held	10	Not held	17
World Championships	C2 team	1	Not held	2	Not held	—	Not held	2	Not held	3

=== World Cup individual podiums ===
Season	Date	Venue	Position	Event
1991	6 Jul 1991	Augsburg	3rd	C2
1992	20 Jun 1992	Bourg St.-Maurice	1st	C2
