= Miroslav Čihák =

Medal record

Men's canoe slalom

Representing Czechoslovakia

World Championships
Silver medal – second place	1959 Geneva	C-2 team
Bronze medal – third place	1955 Tacen	Mixed C-2
Bronze medal – third place	1953 Meran	C-2 team

Miroslav Čihák is a retired Czechoslovak slalom canoeist who competed in the 1950s. He won three medals at the ICF Canoe Slalom World Championships with a silver (C-2 team: 1959) and two bronzes (Mixed C-2: 1955, C-2 team: 1953).
