= Milan Horyna =

Czechoslovak retired slalom canoeist (born 1939)

Medal record

Men's canoe slalom

Representing Czechoslovakia

World Championships
Silver medal – second place	1959 Geneva	C-2 team
Silver medal – second place	1967 Lipno	C-2
Silver medal – second place	1967 Lipno	C-2 team
Bronze medal – third place	1971 Meran	C-2 team

Milan Horyna (born January 9, 1939, in Hradec Králové) is a Czechoslovak retired slalom canoeist who competed from the late 1950s to the early 1970s. He won a four medals at the ICF Canoe Slalom World Championships with three silvers (C-2: 1967; C-2 team: 1967, 1959) and a bronze (C-2 team: 1971).

Horyna also finished 11th in the C-2 event at the 1972 Summer Olympics in Munich.
