= Petr Sodomka =

Medal record

Men's canoe slalom

Representing Czechoslovakia

World Championships
Gold medal – first place	1967 Lipno	C-1 team
Gold medal – first place	1973 Muotathal	C-1 team
Gold medal – first place	1975 Skopje	C-1
Gold medal – first place	1975 Skopje	C-1 team
Gold medal – first place	1977 Spittal	C-1
Silver medal – second place	1969 Bourg St.-Maurice	C-1 team
Bronze medal – third place	1971 Meran	C-1
Bronze medal – third place	1971 Meran	C-1 team
Bronze medal – third place	1977 Spittal	C-1 team

Petr Sodomka (born 19 May 1947 in Pardubice) is a former Czechoslovak slalom canoeist who competed in the 1960s and the 1970s. He won nine medals at the ICF Canoe Slalom World Championships with five golds (C-1: 1975, 1977; C-1 team: 1967, 1973, 1975), a silver (C-1 team: 1969) and three bronzes (C-1: 1971; C-1 team: 1971, 1977).

Sodomka also finished eighth in the C-1 event at the 1972 Summer Olympics in Munich.
