= Marcel Roth =

Medal record

Men's canoe slalom

Representing Switzerland

World Championships
Bronze medal – third place	1959 Geneva	C-1 team
Bronze medal – third place	1961 Hainsberg	C-1 team
Bronze medal – third place	1963 Spittal	C-1 team

Marcel Roth is a Swiss retired slalom canoeist who competed from the late 1950s to the late 1960s. He won three bronze medals in the C-1 team event at the ICF Canoe Slalom World Championships, earning them in 1959, 1961 and 1963.
