= Jacek Kasprzycki =

Polish canoeist

Medal record

Men's canoe slalom

Representing Poland

World Championships
Gold medal – first place	1979 Jonquière	C-2 team
Silver medal – second place	1981 Bala	C-2 team

Jacek Kasprzycki (11 April 1957 – 8 October 2021) was a Polish slalom canoeist who competed from the late 1970s to the mid-1980s.

He won two medals in the C-2 team event at the ICF Canoe Slalom World Championships with a gold in 1979 and a silver in 1981.
