= Norbert Schmidt =

West German slalom canoeist

Medal record

Men's canoe slalom

Representing West Germany

World Championships
Gold medal – first place	1969 Bourg St.-Maurice	C-2 team
Silver medal – second place	1963 Spittal	C-1 team
Bronze medal – third place	1965 Spittal	C-2 team

Norbert Schmidt is a former West German slalom canoeist who competed in the 1960s.

He won a three medals at the ICF Canoe Slalom World Championships with a gold (C-2 team: 1969), a silver (C-1 team: 1963) and a bronze (C-2 team: 1965).
