= 1957 ICF Canoe Slalom World Championships =

Canoe slalom event in Augsburg, West Germany

The 1957 ICF Canoe Slalom World Championships were held in Augsburg, West Germany under the auspices of International Canoe Federation. It was the 5th edition. The Mixed C2 team event debuted at these championships.

== Note ==
Mixed C2 team only had two nations compete.

== Medal summary ==
=== Men's ===
==== Canoe ====
Event	Gold	Points	Silver	Points	Bronze	Points
C1	Manfred Schubert (GDR)	384.4	Emil Zimmermann (GDR)	397.7	Jean-Claude Tochon (SUI)	408.5
C1 team	West Germany; Günther Beck; Heiner Stumpf; Otto Stumpf	654.8	East Germany; Emil Zimmermann; Gert Kleinert; Manfred Schubert	793.2	Czechoslovakia; Luděk Beneš; Jiří Hradil; Vladimír Jirásek	867.6
C2	East Germany; Dieter Friedrich; Horst Kleinert	317.1	Czechoslovakia; Václav Havel; Josef Hendrych	354.0	Czechoslovakia; František Hrabě; Jiří Kotana	377.3
C2 team	Czechoslovakia; Rudolf Flégr & Milan Řehoř; Václav Havel & Josef Hendrych; František Hrabě & Jiří Kotana	818.4	Switzerland; Charles Dussuet & Henri Kadrnka; Jean Pessina & Robert Zürcher; Jean-Paul Rössinger & Roger Tauss	1052.4	East Germany; Franz Brendel & Günter Grosswig; Dieter Friedrich & Horst Kleinert; Dieter Göthe & Lothar Schubert	1107.8

==== Kayak ====
Event	Gold	Points	Silver	Points	Bronze	Points
Folding K1	Manfred Vogt (FRG)	264.8	Dimitrij Skolil (TCH)	274.9	Heinz Bielig (GDR)	283.9
Folding K1 team	East Germany; Heinz Bielig; Eberhard Gläser; Reinhard Sens	403.5	Czechoslovakia; Vladimír Cibák; Jan Pára; Dimitrij Skolil	426.5	West Germany; Manfred Vogt; Günter Kirchner; Karl Schröder	506.2

=== Mixed ===
==== Canoe ====
Event	Gold	Points	Silver	Points	Bronze	Points
C2	East Germany; Brigitte Schmidt; Manfred Glöckner	389.6	East Germany; Ellen Krügel; Siegfried Seidemann	526.2	East Germany; Waltraud Schale; Rudolf Seifert	547.7
C2 team	East Germany; Waltraud Schale & Rudolf Seifert; Margot Seidler & Helmut Schmieder; Brigitte Schmidt & Manfred Glöckner		France; Bonnaud & Thezier; Henriette Guette & Jean Olry; E. Spahr & M. Spahr		-	

=== Women's ===
==== Kayak ====
Event	Gold	Points	Silver	Points	Bronze	Points
Folding K1	Brigitte Magnus (GDR)	452.8	Eva Setzkorn (GDR)	512.6	Anneliese Seidel (GDR)	530.3
Folding K1 team	East Germany; Elfriede Hugo; Eva Setzkorn; Brigitte Magnus	1081.4	West Germany; Inge Walthemate; Rosemarie Biesinger; Hanni Schulte	1441.0	Austria; Hella Philips; Gertrude Stöllner; Fritzi Schwingl	2268.1

== Medals table ==
Rank	Nation	Gold	Silver	Bronze	Total
1	East Germany (GDR)	7	4	4	15
2	West Germany (FRG)	2	1	1	4
3	Czechoslovakia (TCH)	1	3	2	6
4	Switzerland (SUI)	0	1	1	2
5	France (FRA)	0	1	0	1
6	Austria (AUT)	0	0	1	1
Totals (6 entries)		10	10	9	29
