= Dietmar Moos =

German canoeist

Medal record

Men's canoe slalom

Representing West Germany

World Championships
Silver medal – second place	1977 Spittal	C-1 team
Bronze medal – third place	1975 Skopje	C-1 team

Dietmar Moos is a former West German slalom canoeist who competed from the mid-1970s to the mid-1980s. He won two medals in the C-1 team event at the ICF Canoe Slalom World Championships with a silver in 1977 and a bronze in 1975.
