= Gerald Moos =

German canoeist

Medal record

Men's canoe slalom

Representing West Germany

World Championships
Silver medal – second place	1985 Augsburg	C-1 team
Bronze medal – third place	1981 Bala	C-1 team

Gerald Moos is a former West German slalom canoeist who competed in the 1980s. He won two medals in the C-1 team event at the ICF Canoe Slalom World Championships with a silver in 1985 and a bronze in 1981.
