= Walter Gehlen =

German canoeist

Medal record

Men's canoe slalom

Representing West Germany

World Championships
Bronze medal – third place	1965 Spittal	C-2 team

Walter Gehlen is a retired slalom canoeist who competed for West Germany in the mid-1960s. He won a bronze medal in the C-2 team event at the 1965 ICF Canoe Slalom World Championships in Spittal.
