= Manfred Heß =

German canoeist

Medal record

Men's canoe slalom

Representing West Germany

World Championships
Gold medal – first place	1969 Bourg St.-Maurice	C-2 team
Silver medal – second place	1971 Meran	C-2 team
Bronze medal – third place	1967 Lipno	C-2 team

Manfred Heß (born 21 November 1943 in Uerdingen) is a former West German slalom canoeist who competed from the late 1960s to the early 1970s.

He won three medals in the C-2 team event at the ICF Canoe Slalom World Championships with a gold in 1969, a silver in 1971 and a bronze in 1967.
