= František Kadaňka =

Czechoslovak slalom canoeist and Olympic athlete

Medal record

Men's canoe slalom

Representing Czechoslovakia

World Championships
Silver medal – second place	1969 Bourg St.-Maurice	C-1 team
Silver medal – second place	1973 Muotathal	C-2 team
Silver medal – second place	1975 Skopje	C-2 team
Bronze medal – third place	1971 Meran	C-2 team
Bronze medal – third place	1975 Skopje	C-2

František Kadaňka (born 8 October 1944 in Dolní Kounice) is a former Czechoslovak slalom canoeist who competed in the 1960s and 1970s. He won five medals at the ICF Canoe Slalom World Championships with three silvers (C-1 team: 1969; C-2 team: 1973, 1975) and two bronzes (C-2: 1975, C-2 team: 1971).

Kadaňka also finished tenth in the C-2 event at the 1972 Summer Olympics in Munich.
