= Karel Třešňák =

Medal record

Men's canoe slalom

Representing Czechoslovakia

World Championships
Gold medal – first place	1973 Muotathal	C-1 team
Gold medal – first place	1975 Skopje	C-1 team
Silver medal – second place	1973 Muotathal	C-1
Bronze medal – third place	1971 Meran	C-1 team
Bronze medal – third place	1977 Spittal	C-1
Bronze medal – third place	1977 Spittal	C-1 team
Bronze medal – third place	1979 Jonquière	C-1 team

Karel Třešňák (born 21 February 1949 in Karlovy Vary) is a former Czechoslovak slalom canoeist who competed in the 1970s. He won seven medals at the ICF Canoe Slalom World Championships with two golds (C-1 team: 1973, 1975) a silver (C-1: 1973) and four bronzes (C-1: 1977; C-1 team: 1971, 1977, 1979).

Třešňák also finished seventh in the C-1 event at the 1972 Summer Olympics in Munich.
