= Zdeněk Měšťan =

Czechoslovak retired slalom canoeist (born 1944)

Medal record

Men's canoe slalom

Representing Czechoslovakia

World Championships
| Gold medal – first place | 1965 Spittal | C-2 team |
| Silver medal – second place | 1967 Lipno | C-2 team |
| Silver medal – second place | 1969 Bourg St.-Maurice | C-2 |
| Silver medal – second place | 1969 Bourg St.-Maurice | C-2 team |
| Bronze medal – third place | 1967 Lipno | C-2 |
| Bronze medal – third place | 1971 Meran | C-2 team |

Zdeněk Měšťan (born 31 May 1944 in Ostrava) is a Czechoslovak retired slalom canoeist who competed in the 1960s and 1970s. He won six medals at the ICF Canoe Slalom World Championships with a gold (C-2 team: 1965 Spittal), three silvers (C-2: 1969; C-2 team: 1967, 1969) and two bronzes (C-2: 1967, C-2 team: 1971).

Měšťan also finished 16th in the C-2 event at the 1972 Summer Olympics in Munich.
