= Ladislav Měšťan =

Czechoslovak retired slalom canoeist (born 1941)

Medal record

Men's canoe slalom

Representing Czechoslovakia

World Championships
Gold medal – first place	1965 Spittal	C-2 team
Silver medal – second place	1967 Lipno	C-2 team
Silver medal – second place	1969 Bourg St.-Maurice	C-2
Silver medal – second place	1969 Bourg St.-Maurice	C-2 team
Bronze medal – third place	1967 Lipno	C-2
Bronze medal – third place	1971 Meran	C-2 team

Ladislav Měšťan (born 17 May 1941 in Ostrava) is a Czechoslovak retired slalom canoeist who competed in the 1960s and 1970s. He won six medals at the ICF Canoe Slalom World Championships with a gold (C-2 team: 1965 Spittal), three silvers (C-2: 1969; C-2 team: 1967, 1969) and two bronzes (C-2: 1967, C-2 team: 1971).

Měšťan also finished 16th in the C-2 event at the 1972 Summer Olympics in Munich.
