= List of ICF Canoe Slalom World Championships medalists in men's kayak =

This is a list of medalists from the ICF Canoe Slalom World Championships in men's kayak.

== K1 ==
Debuted: 1949. The event was folding from 1949 to 1963

| Championships | Gold | Silver | Bronze |
|---|---|---|---|
| 1949 Geneva | Othmar Eiterer (AUT) | Hans Frühwirth (AUT) | Werner Zimmermann (SUI) |
| 1951 Steyr | Hans Frühwirth (AUT) | Rudolf Pillwein (AUT) | Rudolf Sausgruber (AUT) |
| 1953 Meran | Walter Kirschbaum (FRG) | Rudolf Sausgruber (AUT) | Milan Zadel (YUG) |
| 1955 Tacen | Sigi Holzbauer (FRG) | Miloslav Duffek (SUI) | Jože Ilija (YUG) |
| 1957 Augsburg | Manfred Vogt (FRG) | Dimitrij Skolil (TCH) | Heinz Bielig (GDR) |
| 1959 Geneva | Paul Farrant (GBR) | Eberhard Gläser (GDR) | Heinz Bielig (GDR) |
| 1961 Hainsberg | Eberhard Gläser (GDR) | Roland Hahnebach (GDR) | Jiří Černý (TCH) |
| 1963 Spittal | Jürgen Bremer (GDR) | Rolf Luber (GDR) | Jiří Černý (TCH) |
| 1965 Spittal | Kurt Presslmayr (AUT) | Eberhard Gläser (GDR) | Uli Raysz (FRG) |
| 1967 Lipno | Jürgen Bremer (GDR) | David Mitchell (GBR) | Hans Hunziker (SUI) |
| 1969 Bourg St.-Maurice | Claude Peschier (FRA) | Werner Zimmermann, Jr. (SUI) | Werner Rosener (FRG) |
| 1971 Meran | Siegbert Horn (GDR) | Christian Döring (GDR) | Ulrich Peters (FRG) |
| 1973 Muotathal | Norbert Sattler (AUT) | Siegbert Horn (GDR) | Wojciech Gawroński (POL) |
| 1975 Skopje | Siegbert Horn (GDR) | Ulrich Peters (FRG) | Harald Gimpel (GDR) |
| 1977 Spittal | Albert Kerr (GBR) | Dieter Förstl (FRG) | Norbert Sattler (AUT) |
| 1979 Jonquière | Peter Fauster (AUT) | Eduard Wolffhardt (AUT) | Richard Fox (GBR) |
| 1981 Bala | Richard Fox (GBR) | Luboš Hilgert (TCH) | Jean-Yves Prigent (FRA) |
| 1983 Meran | Richard Fox (GBR) | Toni Prijon (FRG) | Peter Micheler (FRG) |
| 1985 Augsburg | Richard Fox (GBR) | Peter Micheler (FRG) | Luboš Hilgert (TCH) |
| 1987 Bourg St.-Maurice | Toni Prijon (FRG) | Jernej Abramič (YUG) | Marjan Štrukelj (YUG) |
| 1989 Savage River | Richard Fox (GBR) | Gilles Clouzeau (FRA) | Jernej Abramič (YUG) |
| 1991 Tacen | Shaun Pearce (GBR) | Marjan Štrukelj (YUG) | Martin Hemmer (GER) |
| 1993 Mezzana | Richard Fox (GBR) | Richard Weiss (USA) | Melvyn Jones (GBR) |
| 1995 Nottingham | Oliver Fix (GER) | Scott Shipley (USA) | Jiří Prskavec (CZE) |
| 1997 Três Coroas | Thomas Becker (GER) | Scott Shipley (USA) | Paul Ratcliffe (GBR) |
| 1999 La Seu d'Urgell | David Ford (CAN) | Scott Shipley (USA) | Paul Ratcliffe (GBR) |
| 2002 Bourg St.-Maurice | Fabien Lefèvre (FRA) | Miha Terdič (SLO) | Ivan Pišvejc (CZE) |
| 2003 Augsburg | Fabien Lefèvre (FRA) | David Ford (CAN) | Helmut Oblinger (AUT) |
| 2005 Penrith | Fabian Dörfler (GER) | Fabien Lefèvre (FRA) | Peter Cibák (SVK) |
| 2006 Prague | Stefano Cipressi (ITA); Julien Billaut (FRA) | – | Campbell Walsh (GBR) |
| 2007 Foz do Iguaçu | Sébastien Combot (FRA) | Fabian Dörfler (GER) | Campbell Walsh (GBR) |
| 2009 La Seu d'Urgell | Peter Kauzer (SLO) | Boris Neveu (FRA) | Carles Juanmartí (ESP) |
| 2010 Tacen | Daniele Molmenti (ITA) | Vavřinec Hradilek (CZE) | Jure Meglič (SLO) |
| 2011 Bratislava | Peter Kauzer (SLO) | Mateusz Polaczyk (POL) | Fabien Lefèvre (FRA) |
| 2013 Prague | Vavřinec Hradilek (CZE) | Jiří Prskavec (CZE) | Mateusz Polaczyk (POL) |
| 2014 Deep Creek Lake | Boris Neveu (FRA) | Sébastien Combot (FRA) | Mathieu Biazizzo (FRA) |
| 2015 London | Jiří Prskavec (CZE) | Mateusz Polaczyk (POL) | Michal Smolen (USA) |
| 2017 Pau | Ondřej Tunka (CZE) | Vít Přindiš (CZE) | Peter Kauzer (SLO) |
| 2018 Rio de Janeiro | Hannes Aigner (GER) | Jiří Prskavec (CZE) | Pavel Eigel (RUS) |
| 2019 La Seu d'Urgell | Jiří Prskavec (CZE) | David Llorente (ESP) | Joan Crespo (ESP) |
| 2021 Bratislava | Boris Neveu (FRA) | Marcello Beda (ITA) | Joan Crespo (ESP) |
| 2022 Augsburg | Vít Přindiš (CZE) | Giovanni De Gennaro (ITA) | Boris Neveu (FRA) |
| 2023 London | Joe Clarke (GBR) | Jiří Prskavec (CZE) | Mathis Soudi (MAR) |
| 2025 Penrith | Titouan Castryck (FRA) | Jakub Krejčí (CZE) | Jiří Prskavec (CZE) |
| 2026 Oklahoma City | Jakub Krejčí (CZE) | Michał Pasiut (POL) | Giovanni De Gennaro (ITA) |

- Medal table

| Rank | Nation | Gold | Silver | Bronze | Total |
|---|---|---|---|---|---|
| 1 | Great Britain (GBR) | 9 | 1 | 6 | 16 |
| 2 | France (FRA) | 8 | 4 | 4 | 16 |
| 3 | Czech Republic (CZE) | 6 | 6 | 3 | 15 |
| 4 | East Germany | 5 | 6 | 3 | 14 |
| 5 | Austria (AUT) | 5 | 4 | 3 | 12 |
| 6 | West Germany | 4 | 4 | 4 | 12 |
| 7 | Germany (GER) | 4 | 1 | 1 | 6 |
| 8 | Italy (ITA) | 2 | 2 | 1 | 5 |
| 9 | Slovenia (SLO) | 2 | 1 | 2 | 5 |
| 10 | Canada (CAN) | 1 | 1 | 0 | 2 |
| 11 | United States (USA) | 0 | 4 | 1 | 5 |
| 12 | Poland (POL) | 0 | 3 | 2 | 5 |
| 13 | Yugoslavia | 0 | 2 | 4 | 6 |
| 14 | Czechoslovakia | 0 | 2 | 3 | 5 |
| 15 | Switzerland (SUI) | 0 | 2 | 2 | 4 |
| 16 | Spain (ESP) | 0 | 1 | 3 | 4 |
| 17 | Morocco (MAR) | 0 | 0 | 1 | 1 |
| 17 | Russia (RUS) | 0 | 0 | 1 | 1 |
| 17 | Slovakia (SVK) | 0 | 0 | 1 | 1 |
| Totals (19 entries) | | 46 | 44 | 45 | 135 |

== K1 team ==
Debuted: 1949. The event was folding from 1949 to 1963.

| Championships | Gold | Silver | Bronze |
|---|---|---|---|
| 1949 Geneva | Switzerland; Werner Zimmermann; Jean Engler; Eduard Kunz | Austria; Hans Frühwirth; Rudolf Pillwein; Josef Danek | Czechoslovakia; Bohuslav Fiala; Alvin Jeschke; Jiří Valeš |
| 1951 Steyr | Austria; Hans Frühwirth; Rudolf Pillwein; Othmar Eiterer | West Germany; Albert Krais; Ernst Sonntag; Erich Seidel | Switzerland; Eduard Kunz; Werner Zimmermann; Jean Engler |
| 1953 Meran | Austria; Franz Grafetsberger; Hans Herbist; Rudolf Sausgruber | East Germany; Dieter Frank; Helmuth Setzkorn; Hilmar Pawliczek | West Germany; Karl Bruns; Karl Rath; Günter Deuble |
| 1955 Tacen | West Germany; Manfred Vogt; Sigi Holzbauer; Alois Würfmannsdobler | Austria; Robert Fabian; Rudolf Klepp; Eduard Radelspöck | Czechoslovakia; Dimitrij Skolil; Vladimír Cibák; Zdeněk Matějovský |
| 1957 Augsburg | East Germany; Heinz Bielig; Eberhard Gläser; Reinhard Sens | Czechoslovakia; Vladimír Cibák; Jan Pára; Dimitrij Skolil | West Germany; Manfred Vogt; Günter Kirchner; Karl Schröder |
| 1959 Geneva | East Germany; Eberhard Gläser; Heinz Bielig; Günther Möbius | Czechoslovakia; Jan Pára; Vladimír Cibák; Zdeněk Košťál | West Germany; Manfred Vogt; Georg Samhuber; Werner Vogler |
| 1961 Hainsberg | East Germany; Horst Wängler; Eberhard Gläser; Roland Hahnebach | Czechoslovakia; Jaroslav Vyhlíd; Jiří Černý; Zdeněk Košťál | Poland; Eugeniusz Kapłaniak; Jan Niemiec; Władysław Piecyk |
| 1963 Spittal | East Germany; Eberhard Gläser; Rolf Luber; Fritz Lange | Poland; Eugeniusz Kapłaniak; Władysław Piecyk; Bronisław Waruś | Great Britain; David Mitchell; Geoffrey Dinsdale; Martin Rohleder |
| 1965 Spittal | West Germany; Manfred Vogt; Eugen Weimann; Horst Dieter Engelke | East Germany; Eberhard Gläser; Fritz Lange; Rolf Luber | Austria; Robert Fabian; Manfred Hausmann; Kurt Presslmayr |
| 1967 Lipno | East Germany; Jürgen Bremer; Volkmar Fleischer; Christian Döring | West Germany; Herbert Beck; Gunter Trojovsky; Eugen Weimann | France; Claude Lutz; Jean-Louis Olry; Claude Peschier |
| 1969 Bourg St.-Maurice | France; Patrick Maccari; Claude Peschier; Alain Colombe | Great Britain; Kenneth Langford; Raymond Calverley; John MacLeod | West Germany; Jürgen Gerlach; Werner Rosener; Ulrich Peters |
| 1971 Meran | Austria; Kurt Presslmayr; Norbert Sattler; Hans Schlecht | East Germany; Jürgen Bremer; Siegbert Horn; Christian Döring | West Germany; Jürgen Gerlach; Alfred Baum; Ulrich Peters |
| 1973 Muotathal | East Germany; Wolfgang Büchner; Siegbert Horn; Christian Döring | Poland; Jerzy Stanuch; Wojciech Gawroński; Stanisław Majerczak | France; Éric Koechlin; Michel Magdinier; Claude Peschier |
| 1975 Skopje | West Germany; Ulrich Peters; Dieter Förstl; Bernd Dichtl | Poland; Wojciech Gawroński; Jerzy Stanuch; Stanisław Majerczak | East Germany; Harald Gimpel; Siegbert Horn; Christian Döring |
| 1977 Spittal | France; Jean-Yves Prigent; Bernard Renault; Christian Frossard | Austria; Eduard Wolffhardt; Norbert Sattler; Peter Fauster | Poland; Wojciech Gawroński; Jerzy Stanuch; Kazimierz Gawlikowski |
| 1979 Jonquière | Great Britain; Richard Fox; Albert Kerr; Allan Edge | Austria; Norbert Sattler; Peter Fauster; Eduard Wolffhardt | Switzerland; Milo Duffek; René Zimmermann; Martin Brandenburger |
| 1981 Bala | Great Britain; Richard Fox; Albert Kerr; Nicolas Wain | Switzerland; Jürg Götz; Urs Steinmann; Milo Duffek | France; Jean-Yves Prigent; Thierry Junquet; Bernard Renault |
| 1983 Meran | Great Britain; Richard Fox; Paul McConkey; Jim Dolan | West Germany; Toni Prijon; Peter Micheler; Dirk Bovensmann | Czechoslovakia; Luboš Hilgert; Ivan Hilgert; Jiří Měchura |
| 1985 Augsburg | West Germany; Peter Micheler; Toni Prijon; Jürgen Kübler | France; Christophe Prigent; Pascal Marinot; Manuel Brissaud | Yugoslavia; Marjan Štrukelj; Janez Skok; Jernej Abramič |
| 1987 Bourg St.-Maurice | Great Britain; Richard Fox; Melvyn Jones; Russell Smith | Yugoslavia; Jernej Abramič; Marjan Štrukelj; Janez Skok | France; Christophe Prigent; Laurent Brissaud; Manuel Brissaud |
| 1989 Savage River | Yugoslavia; Jernej Abramič; Marjan Štrukelj; Albin Čižman | Italy; Marco Caldera; Pierpaolo Ferrazzi; Ettore Ivaldi | West Germany; Michael Seibert; Thomas Hilger; Martin Hemmer |
| 1991 Tacen | France; Manuel Brissaud; Gilles Clouzeau; Jean-Michel Regnier | Germany; Thomas Becker; Michael Glöckle; Michael Seibert | Czechoslovakia; Luboš Hilgert; Peter Nagy; Pavel Přindiš |
| 1993 Mezzana | Great Britain; Richard Fox; Melvyn Jones; Shaun Pearce | France; Manuel Brissaud; Vincent Fondeviole; Sylvain Curinier | Czech Republic; Vojtěch Bareš; Pavel Přindiš; Luboš Hilgert |
| 1995 Nottingham | Germany; Jochen Lettmann; Thomas Becker; Oliver Fix | Slovenia; Fedja Marušič; Marjan Štrukelj; Andraž Vehovar | Great Britain; Andrew Raspin; Shaun Pearce; Ian Raspin |
| 1997 Três Coroas | Great Britain; Paul Ratcliffe; Ian Raspin; Shaun Pearce | France; Vincent Fondeviole; Jean-Michel Regnier; Ludovic Boulesteix | Germany; Thomas Becker; Jochen Lettmann; Holger Häffner |
| 1999 La Seu d'Urgell | Germany; Thomas Becker; Ralf Schaberg; Jakobus Stenglein | Slovenia; Andraž Vehovar; Fedja Marušič; Miha Štricelj | Czech Republic; Tomáš Kobes; Jiří Prskavec; Vojtěch Bareš |
| 2002 Bourg St.-Maurice | Germany; Claus Suchanek; Thomas Becker; Thomas Schmidt | Italy; Pierpaolo Ferrazzi; Matteo Pontarollo; Luca Costa | France; Thomas Monier; Benoît Peschier; Fabien Lefèvre |
| 2003 Augsburg | Switzerland; Thomas Mosimann; Mathias Röthenmund; Michael Kurt | Netherlands; David Backhouse; Floris Braat; Sam Oud | Germany; Thilo Schmitt; Thomas Schmidt; Claus Suchanek |
| 2005 Penrith | France; Julien Billaut; Fabien Lefèvre; Benoît Peschier | Italy; Pierpaolo Ferrazzi; Matteo Pontarollo; Daniele Molmenti | Slovenia; Andrej Nolimal; Dejan Kralj; Peter Kauzer |
| 2006 Prague | France; Fabien Lefèvre; Julien Billaut; Boris Neveu | Italy; Daniele Molmenti; Stefano Cipressi; Diego Paolini | Poland; Grzegorz Polaczyk; Mateusz Polaczyk; Dariusz Popiela |
| 2007 Foz do Iguaçu | Germany; Fabian Dörfler; Alexander Grimm; Erik Pfannmöller | France; Julien Billaut; Pierre Bourliaud; Sébastien Combot | Czech Republic; Ivan Pišvejc; Vavřinec Hradilek; Luboš Hilgert |
| 2009 La Seu d'Urgell | Czech Republic; Ivan Pišvejc; Vavřinec Hradilek; Michal Buchtel | Great Britain; Campbell Walsh; Huw Swetnam; Richard Hounslow | Spain; Joan Crespo; Guillermo Díez-Canedo; Carles Juanmartí |
| 2010 Tacen | Germany; Alexander Grimm; Fabian Dörfler; Hannes Aigner | France; Pierre Bourliaud; Boris Neveu; Fabien Lefèvre | Italy; Daniele Molmenti; Diego Paolini; Stefano Cipressi |
| 2011 Bratislava | Germany; Sebastian Schubert; Hannes Aigner; Alexander Grimm | France; Boris Neveu; Vivien Colober; Fabien Lefèvre | Italy; Giovanni De Gennaro; Daniele Molmenti; Omar Raiba |
| 2013 Prague | Italy; Daniele Molmenti; Andrea Romeo; Giovanni De Gennaro | Poland; Grzegorz Polaczyk; Mateusz Polaczyk; Dariusz Popiela | France; Boris Neveu; Étienne Daille; Mathieu Biazizzo |
| 2014 Deep Creek Lake | France; Mathieu Biazizzo; Sébastien Combot; Boris Neveu | Czech Republic; Jiří Prskavec; Vavřinec Hradilek; Vít Přindiš | Great Britain; Richard Hounslow; Joseph Clarke; Thomas Brady |
| 2015 London | Czech Republic; Jiří Prskavec; Vavřinec Hradilek; Ondřej Tunka | Slovakia; Martin Halčin; Andrej Málek; Jakub Grigar | Great Britain; Richard Hounslow; Joseph Clarke; Bradley Forbes-Cryans |
| 2017 Pau | Czech Republic; Jiří Prskavec; Ondřej Tunka; Vít Přindiš | France; Boris Neveu; Mathieu Biazizzo; Sébastien Combot | Slovenia; Peter Kauzer; Martin Srabotnik; Žan Jakše |
| 2018 Rio de Janeiro | Great Britain; Joseph Clarke; Bradley Forbes-Cryans; Christopher Bowers | Poland; Dariusz Popiela; Mateusz Polaczyk; Michał Pasiut | Czech Republic; Ondřej Tunka; Vít Přindiš; Jiří Prskavec |
| 2019 La Seu d'Urgell | Spain; David Llorente; Samuel Hernanz; Joan Crespo | Czech Republic; Jiří Prskavec; Vít Přindiš; Vavřinec Hradilek | Poland; Dariusz Popiela; Michał Pasiut; Krzysztof Majerczak |
| 2021 Bratislava | France; Boris Neveu; Mathieu Biazizzo; Benjamin Renia | Slovakia; Jakub Grigar; Martin Halčin; Adam Gonšenica | Slovenia; Peter Kauzer; Martin Srabotnik; Niko Testen |
| 2022 Augsburg | Germany; Hannes Aigner; Noah Hegge; Stefan Hengst | Great Britain; Joseph Clarke; Christopher Bowers; Bradley Forbes-Cryans | France; Boris Neveu; Titouan Castryck; Malo Quéméneur |
| 2023 London | Czech Republic; Jiří Prskavec; Vít Přindiš; Jakub Krejčí | France; Boris Neveu; Titouan Castryck; Benjamin Renia | Poland; Mateusz Polaczyk; Michał Pasiut; Dariusz Popiela |
| 2025 Penrith | France; Titouan Castryck; Benjamin Renia; Anatole Delassus | Japan; Yusuke Muto; Yuuki Tanaka; Kazuya Adachi | Great Britain; Ben Haylett; Jonny Dickson; Joseph Clarke |
| 2026 Oklahoma City | Slovenia; Žiga Lin Hočevar; Lan Tominc; Peter Kauzer | Switzerland; Martin Dougoud; Jan Rohrer; Gelindo Chiarello | Austria; Felix Oschmautz; Mario Leitner; Max Steinbrenner |

- Medal table

| Rank | Nation | Gold | Silver | Bronze | Total |
|---|---|---|---|---|---|
| 1 | France (FRA) | 8 | 8 | 7 | 23 |
| 2 | Great Britain (GBR) | 7 | 3 | 5 | 15 |
| 3 | Germany (GER) | 7 | 1 | 2 | 10 |
| 4 | East Germany | 6 | 3 | 1 | 10 |
| 5 | West Germany | 4 | 3 | 6 | 13 |
| 6 | Czech Republic (CZE) | 4 | 2 | 4 | 10 |
| 7 | Austria (AUT) | 3 | 4 | 2 | 9 |
| 8 | Switzerland (SUI) | 2 | 2 | 2 | 6 |
| 9 | Italy (ITA) | 1 | 4 | 2 | 7 |
| 10 | Slovenia (SLO) | 1 | 2 | 3 | 6 |
| 11 | Yugoslavia | 1 | 1 | 1 | 3 |
| 12 | Spain (ESP) | 1 | 0 | 1 | 2 |
| 13 | Poland (POL) | 0 | 5 | 5 | 10 |
| 14 | Czechoslovakia | 0 | 3 | 4 | 7 |
| 15 | Slovakia (SVK) | 0 | 2 | 0 | 2 |
| 16 | Japan (JPN) | 0 | 1 | 0 | 1 |
| 16 | Netherlands (NED) | 0 | 1 | 0 | 1 |
| Totals (17 entries) | | 45 | 45 | 45 | 135 |

== Kayak cross ==
Debuted: 2017 (as extreme kayak)

| Championships | Gold | Silver | Bronze |
|---|---|---|---|
| 2017 Pau | Vavřinec Hradilek (CZE) | Boris Neveu (FRA) | Mike Dawson (NZL) |
| 2018 Rio de Janeiro | Christian De Dionigi (ITA) | Boris Neveu (FRA) | Thomas Bersinger (ARG) |
| 2019 Prague | Stefan Hengst (GER) | Nikita Gubenko (RUS) | Pedro Gonçalves (BRA) |
| 2021 Bratislava | Joseph Clarke (GBR) | Finn Butcher (NZL) | Mario Leitner (AUT) |
| 2022 Augsburg | Joseph Clarke (GBR) | Anatole Delassus (FRA) | Stefan Hengst (GER) |
| 2023 London | Joseph Clarke (GBR) | Boris Neveu (FRA) | Martin Dougoud (SUI) |
| 2025 Penrith | Joseph Clarke (GBR) | Mathurin Madoré (FRA) | Matyáš Novák (CZE) |
| 2026 Oklahoma City | Vít Přindiš (CZE) | Dimitri Marx (SUI) | Sam Leaver (GBR) |

- Medal table

| Rank | Nation | Gold | Silver | Bronze | Total |
|---|---|---|---|---|---|
| 1 | Great Britain (GBR) | 4 | 0 | 1 | 5 |
| 2 | Czech Republic (CZE) | 2 | 0 | 1 | 3 |
| 3 | Germany (GER) | 1 | 0 | 1 | 2 |
| 4 | Italy (ITA) | 1 | 0 | 0 | 1 |
| 5 | France (FRA) | 0 | 5 | 0 | 5 |
| 6 | New Zealand (NZL) | 0 | 1 | 1 | 2 |
| 6 | Switzerland (SUI) | 0 | 1 | 1 | 2 |
| 8 | Russia (RUS) | 0 | 1 | 0 | 1 |
| 9 | Argentina (ARG) | 0 | 0 | 1 | 1 |
| 9 | Austria (AUT) | 0 | 0 | 1 | 1 |
| 9 | Brazil (BRA) | 0 | 0 | 1 | 1 |
| Totals (11 entries) | | 8 | 8 | 8 | 24 |

== Kayak cross individual ==
Debuted: 2025

| Championships | Gold | Silver | Bronze |
|---|---|---|---|
| 2025 Penrith | David Llorente (ESP) | Joseph Clarke (GBR) | Jakub Krejčí (CZE) |
| 2026 Oklahoma City | Joseph Clarke (GBR) | Jakub Krejčí (CZE) | David Llorente (ESP) |

- Medal table

| Rank | Nation | Gold | Silver | Bronze | Total |
|---|---|---|---|---|---|
| 1 | Great Britain (GBR) | 1 | 1 | 0 | 2 |
| 2 | Spain (ESP) | 1 | 0 | 1 | 2 |
| 3 | Czech Republic (CZE) | 0 | 1 | 1 | 2 |
| Totals (3 entries) | | 2 | 2 | 2 | 6 |
