= Herbert Beck =

Herbert Beck may refer to:

- Herbert Beck (canoeist) (fl. 1960s), West German canoeist
- Herbert Beck (art historian) (1941–2026), German art historian

== See also ==
- Herbert L. Becker (born 1951), American magician, escapologist, stuntman, author and businessman
