= Vosler =

Vosler is a surname. Notable people with the surname include:

- Forrest L. Vosler (1923–1992), American aviator
- Jason Vosler (born 1993), American baseball player
- Kent Vosler (born 1955), American diver

== See also ==
- Vogler (surname)
- Vossler
