= Frank Becker =

Frank Becker may refer to:

- Frank J. Becker (1899–1981), U.S. Representative from New York
- Frank Becker (canoeist), former West German slalom canoeist
