= Frühwirth =

Frühwirth is a surname. Notable people with the surname include:

- Andreas Frühwirth (1845–1933), Austrian friar of the Dominican Order
- David Frühwirth (born 1974), Austrian violinist
- Eduard Frühwirth (1908–1973), Austrian football player and manager
- Hans Frühwirth, Austrian slalom canoeist
- Josef Frühwirth (1907–1944), Austrian international footballer
- Thomas Frühwirth (born 1981), Austrian para-cyclist
