= Piecyk =

Piecyk is a Polish surname. Notable people with the surname include:

- Danuta Piecyk (born 1950), Polish sprinter
- Willi Piecyk (1948–2008), German politician
- Władysław Piecyk, Polish canoeist
