= Holzbauer =

Holzbauer is a surname. Notable people with this surname include:

- Sigi Holzbauer is a retired West German slalom canoeist who competed in the mid-1950s. He won two gold medals at the 1955 ICF Canoe Slalom World Championships.
- Ignaz Holzbauer (18 September 1711 – 7 April 1783) was a composer of symphonies, concertos, operas, and chamber music, and a member of the Mannheim school.
- Wilhelm Holzbauer (3 September 1930, Salzburg) is an Austrian architect, noted as a "pragmatic" modernist.
