= Hauschild =

Hauschild is a surname. Notable people with the surname include:

- Jürgen Hauschild, German canoeist
- Mike Hauschild (born 1990), American baseball pitcher
- Winston Hauschild (born 1973), Canadian record producer and songwriter

== See also ==
- George H. Hauschild Building, building in Victoria, Texas.
- Hauschildt
