= Alistair Munro =

British canoeist (born 1958)

Medal record

Men's canoe slalom

Representing Great Britain

World Championships
Gold medal – first place	1981 Bala	C-2 team

Alistair Munro born 24, September 1958 in Greenock, Scotland is a retired international sports person. He was a competitive slalom canoeist before turning to coaching and sports reporting.

== Canoeing ==
Formerly a British slalom canoeist who competed in the 1970s and 1980s in all disciplines of the sport. He started in sea kayaking and then competed for Scotland national Team in sprint marathon disciplines before specializing in white water/slalom disciplines. Alistair won numerous national titles in Scotland in multiple disciplines in a sporting career lasting from 1974 to 1986.

He won with Jock Young (canoeist) the British Slalom C-2 championships in 1979, won the Pre World Championships at Bala in 1980, then won a gold medal in the C-2 team event at the 1981 ICF Canoe Slalom World Championships in Bala.

He competed until the 1985 World Championships at Augsburg and retired from his canoe slalom career after this event.

From 1991 – 1996 he was the personal coach to Lynn Simpson (Reys) and coached her at the Barcelona and Atlanta Olympics. In 1995 Lynn Simpson won the LK-1 at the Canoe Slalom World Championships at Holme Pierrepont in Nottingham, England.
