= Cibak =

Cibak may be,

- Cibak language

== People ==
- Martin Cibák
- Peter Cibák
- Vladimír Cibák
