= Kny =

Kny can refer to:

- Demon Slayer: Kimetsu no Yaiba, Japanese manga series
- Kanyok language, Bantu language of the Democratic Republic of the Congo
- KNY Factory, nickname of Yannick Rastogi, Canadian musician
- Leopold Kny (1841–1916), German botanist
- Milan Kný, former Czechoslovak canoeist
