= Vogler =

Vogler may refer to:

== People ==
- Vogler (surname), a list of people with the surname Vogler
- Vogler Quartet

== Places ==
- Vogler (hill range), a hill range in the Central Uplands of Germany
- Vogler Peak, rock peak in Antarctica
- Vogler Air Base, used by the Austrian Air Force
