= Kusuda =

Kusuda (written: 楠田 lit. "camphor tree field") is a Japanese surname. Notable people with the surname include:

- Aina Kusuda (楠田 亜衣奈, born 1989), Japanese voice actress and singer
- Daizo Kusuda (楠田 大蔵, born 1975), Japanese politician
- Kaori Kusuda (楠田 香穂里, born 1974), Japanese basketball player
- Yuri Kusuda, American canoe slalomist
