= Susan Small =

Susan Small may refer to:

- Susan Small (canoeist), British former canoeist
- Susan Small (fashion), British fashion label
