= Bernard Renault =

Bernard Renault may refer to:

- Bernard Renault (canoeist)
- Bernard Renault (botanist)
- Bernard Renault (Twin Peaks)
