= Paul Grabow =

American slalom canoeist

Medal record

Men's canoe slalom

Representing United States

World Championships
Bronze medal – third place	1981 Bala	C-2
Bronze medal – third place	1981 Bala	C-2 team
Bronze medal – third place	1985 Augsburg	C-2 team

Paul Grabow is an American slalom canoeist who competed in the 1980s. He won three bronze medals at the ICF Canoe Slalom World Championships, earning them in 1981 (C-2, C-2 team) and 1985 (C-2 team). He also has five U.S. National Championship titles in slalom C-2, C-2 Mixed, and C-2 Wildwater. He also competed for the U.S. team in C-2 Wildwater in the 1979 and 1989 World Championships.
