= Jocelyne Roupioz =

Medal record

Women's canoe slalom

Representing France

World Championships
Bronze medal – third place	1981 Bala	K-1

Jocelyne Roupioz is a former French slalom canoeist who competed from the mid-1970s to the early 1980s. She won a bronze medal in the K-1 event at the 1981 ICF Canoe Slalom World Championships in Bala, Gwynedd, Wales.
