= Lothar Schubert =

East German slalom canoeist

Medal record

Men's canoe slalom

Representing East Germany

World Championships
Gold medal – first place	1959 Geneva	C-2 team
Bronze medal – third place	1957 Augsburg	C-2 team
Bronze medal – third place	1959 Geneva	C-2

Lothar Schubert is a retired East German slalom canoeist who competed from the late 1950s to the early 1960s. He won three medals at the ICF Canoe Slalom World Championships with a gold (C-2 team: 1959) and two bronzes (C-2: 1959, C-2 team: 1957).
