= Jennifer Stone (canoeist) =

American canoeist

Medal record

Women's canoe slalom

Representing United States

World Championships
Silver medal – second place	1989 Savage River	K-1 team

Jennifer Stone is a former American slalom canoeist who competed from the mid-1980s to the early 1990s. She won a silver medal in the K-1 team event at the 1989 ICF Canoe Slalom World Championships in Savage River.
