= Marek Maslanka =

Polish canoeist

Medal record

Men's canoe slalom

Representing Poland

World Championships
Silver medal – second place	1981 Bala	C-2 team

Marek Maslanka is a former Polish slalom canoeist who competed from the mid-1970s to the mid-1980s. He won a silver medal in the C-2 team event at the 1981 ICF Canoe Slalom World Championships in Bala.
