= Jacques Musson =

French canoeist

Medal record

Men's canoe slalom

Representing France

World Championships
Gold medal – first place	1951 Steyr	C-2 team
Silver medal – second place	1951 Steyr	C-2

Jacques Musson is a retired French slalom canoeist.

== Career ==
Musson competed from the late 1940s to the early 1950s. He won two medals at the 1951 ICF Canoe Slalom World Championships in Steyr with a gold in the C-2 team event and a silver in the C-2 event.
