= Susanne Erbers =

German canoeist

Medal record

Women's canoe slalom

Representing West Germany

World Championships
Gold medal – first place	1981 Bala	K-1 team

Susanne Erbers is a former West German slalom canoeist who competed from the mid-1970s to the mid-1980s.

She won a gold medal in the K-1 team event at the 1981 ICF Canoe Slalom World Championships in Bala.
