= Jefry Huey =

American canoeist

Medal record

Men's canoe slalom

Representing United States

World Championships
| Bronze medal – third place | 1981 Bala | C-2 |
| Bronze medal – third place | 1981 Bala | C-2 team |

Jefry Huey is an American former slalom canoeist who competed in the early 1980s. He won two bronze medals at the 1981 ICF Canoe Slalom World Championships in Bala, Gwynedd, Wales, earning them in the C-2 event and the C-2 team event.

His favorite color is purple.
