= Borut Javornik =

Slovenian slalom canoeist

Medal record

Men's canoe slalom

Representing Yugoslavia

World Championships
Bronze medal – third place	1989 Savage River	C-1 team

Borut Javornik (born 14 April 1967 in Krka) is a Yugoslav-born, Slovenian slalom canoeist who competed from the mid-1980s to the mid-1990s. He won a bronze medal in the C-1 team event at the 1989 ICF Canoe Slalom World Championships in Savage River. He also finished 16th in the C-1 event at the 1992 Summer Olympics in Barcelona.
