= Jacques Velard =

Medal record

Men's canoe slalom

Representing France

World Championships
Bronze medal – third place	1953 Meran	C-1 team

Jacques Velard is a French retired slalom canoeist who competed in the early-to-mid 1950s. He won a bronze medal in the C-1 team event at the 1953 ICF Canoe Slalom World Championships in Meran.
