= Martin Fröhlke =

German canoeist

Medal record

Men's canoe slalom

Representing West Germany

World Championships
Bronze medal – third place	1989 Savage River	C-2 team

Martin Fröhlke is a former West German slalom canoeist who competed in the 1980s and the 1990s. He won a bronze medal in the C-2 team event at the 1989 ICF Canoe Slalom World Championships in Savage River.
