= Charles Dussuet =

Swiss slalom canoeist

Medal record

Men's canoe slalom

Representing Switzerland

World Championships
Gold medal – first place	1951 Steyr	C-1
Gold medal – first place	1953 Meran	C-1
Gold medal – first place	1953 Meran	C-2
Silver medal – second place	1953 Meran	C-1 team
Silver medal – second place	1953 Meran	C-2 team
Silver medal – second place	1957 Augsburg	C-2 team
Bronze medal – third place	1951 Steyr	C-2 team
Bronze medal – third place	1959 Geneva	C-2 team
Bronze medal – third place	1961 Hainsberg	C-2 team

Charles Dussuet is a Swiss retired slalom canoeist who competed from the late 1940s to the early 1960s. He won nine medals at the ICF Canoe Slalom World Championships with three golds (C-1: 1951, 1953; C-2: 1953), three silvers (C-1 team: 1953; C-2 team: 1953, 1957) and three bronzes (C-2 team: 1951, 1959, 1961).
