= Eva Speck =

Swiss canoeist

Sport
- Sport: Kayaking
- Event: Folding kayak
Medal record
Women's canoe slalom
Representing Switzerland
World Championships
Bronze medal – third place	1951 Steyr	Folding K-1 team

Eva Speck is a retired Swiss slalom canoeist who competed in the early 1950s. Representing Switzerland on the international stage, she was part of the early generations of athletes who contributed to the growth of slalom canoeing in the country.

== Achievements ==
In 1951, Speck won a bronze medal in the folding K-1 team event at the ICF Canoe Slalom World Championships in Steyr, Austria, marking a significant achievement in her career. Later, in 1969, she competed in the Mixed C2 team event, securing another bronze medal at the World Championships in Bourg St.-Maurice, France.

== Legacy and influence ==
Speck was a pioneer in Swiss slalom canoeing, representing her country during a time of growing popularity for the sport. Her achievements at the world championships reflect her role in bringing visibility to Swiss athletes in slalom canoeing.

== See also ==
- ICF Canoe Slalom World Championships
- Canoeing in Switzerland
