= Günter Brümmer =

German slalom canoeist (1933–2020)

Medal record

Men's canoe slalom

Representing West Germany

World Championships
Silver medal – second place	1963 Spittal	C-2 team

Günter Brümmer (15 February 1933 – 1 January 2020) was a West German slalom canoeist who competed from the mid-1950s to the mid-1960s. He won a silver medal in the C-2 team event at the 1963 ICF Canoe Slalom World Championships in Spittal.
