= Eveline Pawliczek =

East German slalom canoeist

Sport
- Sport: Kayaking
- Event: Folding kayak
Medal record
Women's canoe slalom
Representing East Germany
World Championships
Silver medal – second place	1953 Meran	Folding K-1 team

Eveline Pawliczek is a retired East German slalom canoeist who competed in the mid-1950s. She won a silver medal in the folding K-1 team event at the 1953 ICF Canoe Slalom World Championships in Meran.
