= Carl Gutschick =

American slalom canoeist

Medal record

Men's canoe slalom

Representing United States

World Championships
Bronze medal – third place	1981 Bala	C-2 team

Carl Gutschick is a former American slalom canoeist who competed from the late 1970s to the early 1980s. He won a bronze medal in the C-2 team event at the 1981 ICF Canoe Slalom World Championships in Bala.
