= Thierry Lepeltier =

French canoeist

Medal record

Men's canoe slalom

Representing France

World Championships
Silver medal – second place	1989 Savage River	C-1 team

Thierry Lepeltier (born 1962) is a former French slalom canoeist who competed in the 1980s and the 1990s. He won a silver medal in the C-1 team event at the 1989 ICF Canoe Slalom World Championships in Savage River.
