= Barbara McKee =

American canoeist

Medal record

Women's canoe slalom

Representing United States

World Championships
Silver medal – second place	1981 Bala	Mixed C-2

Barbara McKee is a former American slalom canoeist who competed in the early 1980s. She won a silver medal in the mixed C-2 event at the 1981 ICF Canoe Slalom World Championships in Bala, Gwynedd, Wales.
