= Elizabeth Turner =

American canoeist

Medal record

Women's canoe slalom

Representing United States

World Championships
Gold medal – first place	1981 Bala	Mixed C-2

Elizabeth Turner is an American slalom canoeist who competed in the 1980s. She won a gold medal in the mixed C-2 event at the 1981 ICF Canoe Slalom World Championships in Bala, Gwynedd, Wales.
