= Hauschildt =

Hauschildt is a surname. Notable people with the surname include:

- Bodil Hauschildt (1861–1951), Danish photographer
- Edgar Hauschildt (1902–1954), German-born Brazilian cinematographer
- Steve Hauschildt (born 1984), American electronic musician
- Melissa Hauschildt (born 1983), Australian triathlete

== See also ==
- Hauschild
