= Bohumil Berdych =

Medal record

Men's canoe slalom

Representing Czechoslovakia

World Championships
| Silver medal – second place | 1951 Steyr | C-2 team |

Bohumil Berdych is a retired slalom canoeist who competed for Czechoslovakia in the early 1950s. He won a silver medal in the C-2 team event at the 1951 ICF Canoe Slalom World Championships in Steyr.
