= Jacques Marsigny =

French canoeist

Medal record

Men's canoe slalom

Representing France

World Championships
Silver medal – second place	1951 Steyr	C-1 team
Bronze medal – third place	1951 Steyr	C-1
Bronze medal – third place	1953 Meran	C-1 team

Jacques Marsigny is a retired French slalom canoeist who competed in the early-to-mid 1950s. He won three medals at the ICF Canoe Slalom World Championships with a silver (C-1 team: 1951) and two bronzes (C-1: 1951, C-1 team: 1953).
