= Alenka Bernot =

Yugoslav canoeist

Medal record

Women's canoe slalom

Representing Yugoslavia

World Championships
Gold medal – first place	1963 Spittal	Mixed C-2

Alenka Bernot is a former slalom canoeist who competed for Yugoslavia in the early-to-mid 1960s. She won a gold medal in the mixed C-2 event at the 1963 ICF Canoe Slalom World Championships in Spittal.
