= Franz Tutschka =

Austrian canoeist

Medal record

Men's canoe slalom

Representing Austria

World Championships
Bronze medal – third place	1963 Spittal	C-2 team

Franz Tutschka is an Austrian retired slalom canoeist who competed from the early 1960s to the early 1970s. He won a bronze medal in the C-2 team event at the 1963 ICF Canoe Slalom World Championships in Spittal.
