= Jiří Pecka (canoeist) =

Czechoslovak canoeist (1917–1997)

Medal record

Representing Czechoslovakia

Men's canoe sprint

Olympic Games
Silver medal – second place	1948 London	C-2 10000 m

Canoe Sprint World Championships
Bronze medal – third place	1950 Copenhagen	C-2 1000 m

Men's canoe slalom

Canoe Slalom World Championships
Gold medal – first place	1955 Tacen	Mixed C-2
Silver medal – second place	1951 Steyr	C-2 team
Bronze medal – third place	1951 Steyr	C-2
Bronze medal – third place	1953 Meran	C-2 team

Jiří Pecka (4 June 4, 1917 – 12 May 1997) was a Czech slalom and sprint canoeist who competed for Czechoslovakia from the late 1940s to the late 1950s. He was born and died in Prague.

Pecka won a silver medal in the C-2 10000 m event at the 1948 Summer Olympics in London. He also won a bronze medal in the C-2 1000 m event at the 1950 ICF Canoe Sprint World Championships in Copenhagen.

At the ICF Canoe Slalom World Championships he won a total of four medals with a gold (Mixed C-2: |1955), a silver (C-2 team: 1951) and two bronzes (C-2: 1951, C-2 team: 1953).
