= Kurt Longrich =

Medal record

Men's canoe slalom

Representing West Germany

World Championships
Silver medal – second place	1963 Spittal	C-2 team

Kurt Longrich is a retired West German slalom canoeist who competed from the late 1950s to the mid-1960s. He won a silver medal in the C-2 team event at the 1963 ICF Canoe Slalom World Championships in Spittal.
