= Siegfried Lück =

Medal record

Men's canoe slalom

Representing East Germany

World Championships
Gold medal – first place	1963 Spittal	C-2 team
Gold medal – first place	1967 Lipno	C-2 team
Bronze medal – third place	1963 Spittal	C-2

Siegfried Lück is a retired East German slalom canoeist who competed from the late 1950s to the late 1960s. He won three medals at the ICF Canoe Slalom World Championships, with two golds (C-2 team: 1963, 1967) and a bronze (C-2: 1963).
