= Jean-Luc Houssaye =

French canoeist

Medal record

Men's canoe slalom

Representing France

World Championships
Gold medal – first place	1953 Meran	C-2 team
Bronze medal – third place	1953 Meran	C-2

Jean-Luc Houssaye is a retired French slalom canoeist who competed in the mid-1950s. He won two medals at the 1953 ICF Canoe Slalom World Championships in Meran with a gold in the C-2 team event and a bronze in the C-2 event.
