= Helmut Schilhuber =

Austrian canoeist

Medal record

Men's canoe slalom

Representing Austria

World Championships
Bronze medal – third place	1963 Spittal	C-2 team

Helmut Schilhuber is an Austrian retired slalom canoeist who competed in the mid-to-late 1960s. He won a bronze medal in the C-2 team event at the 1963 ICF Canoe Slalom World Championships in Spittal.
