= Anni Reifinger =

West German slalom canoeist who competed in the 1950s

Sport
- Sport: Kayaking
- Event: Folding kayak
Medal record
Women's canoe slalom
Representing West Germany
World Championships
Silver medal – second place	1951 Steyr	Folding K-1 team
Silver medal – second place	1955 Tacen	Folding K-1 team
Bronze medal – third place	1951 Steyr	Folding K-1

Anni Reifinger is a retired West German slalom canoeist who competed in the 1950s. She won three medals at the ICF Canoe Slalom World Championships with two silvers (Folding K-1 team: 1951, 1955) and a bronze (Folding K-1: 1951).
