= Liesl Fischer =

West German canoeist

Sport
- Sport: Kayaking
- Event: Folding kayak
Medal record
Women's canoe slalom
Representing West Germany
World Championships
Silver medal – second place	1951 Steyr	Folding K-1 team

Liesl Fischer is a retired slalom canoeist who competed for West Germany in the early 1950s. She won a silver medal in the folding K-1 team event at the 1951 ICF Canoe Slalom World Championships in Steyr.
