= Jean Salamé =

Medal record

Men's canoe slalom

Representing France

World Championships
Silver medal – second place	1981 Bala	C-1 team

Jean Salamé is a former French slalom canoeist who competed in the early 1980s. He won a silver medal in the C-1 team event at the 1981 ICF Canoe Slalom World Championships in Bala.
