= Jaroslav Váňa =

Medal record

Men's canoe slalom

Representing Czechoslovakia

World Championships
Gold medal – first place	1951 Steyr	C-1 team
Silver medal – second place	1951 Steyr	C-1

Jaroslav "Yoptou" Váňa is a Czechoslovak retired slalom canoeist who competed in the early 1950s. He won two medals at the 1951 ICF Canoe Slalom World Championships in Steyr with a gold in the C-1 team event and a silver in the C-1 event.
