= Pierre Rössinger =

Medal record

Men's canoe slalom

Representing Switzerland

World Championships
Silver medal – second place	1953 Meran	C-2 team

Pierre Rössinger is a Swiss retired slalom canoeist who competed in the mid-1950s. He won a silver medal in the C-2 team event at the 1953 ICF Canoe Slalom World Championships in Meran.
