= Madeleine Zimmermann =

Swiss canoeist

Sport
- Sport: Kayaking
- Event: Folding kayak
Medal record
Women's canoe slalom
Representing Switzerland
World Championships
Bronze medal – third place	1951 Steyr	Folding K-1 team

Madeleine Zimmermann is a Swiss retired slalom canoeist who competed from the early 1950s to the late 1960s. She won a bronze medal in the folding K-1 team event at the 1951 ICF Canoe Slalom World Championships in Steyr.
