= Dana Martanová =

Czechoslovak canoeist

Medal record

Women's canoe slalom

Representing Czechoslovakia

World Championships
| Gold medal – first place | 1953 Meran | Folding K-1 team |
| Gold medal – first place | 1955 Tacen | Mixed C-2 |
| Bronze medal – third place | 1953 Meran | Folding K-1 |

Dana Martanová is a retired Czechoslovak slalom canoeist who competed in the mid-1950s. She won three medals at the ICF Canoe Slalom World Championships with two golds (Mixed C-2: 1955; Folding K-1 team: 1953) and a bronze (Folding K-1: 1953).
