= Margitta Krüger =

Medal record

Women's canoe slalom

Representing East Germany

World Championships
Silver medal – second place	1963 Spittal	Mixed C-2

Margitta Krüger is a retired East German slalom canoeist who competed in the mid-1960s. She won a silver medal in the mixed C-2 event at the 1963 ICF Canoe Slalom World Championships in Spittal.
