= Václav Havel (canoeist) =

Czechoslovak slalom and sprint canoeist

Medal record

Representing Czechoslovakia

Men's canoe sprint

Olympic Games
Silver medal – second place	1948 London	C-2 10000 m

Canoe Sprint World Championships
Bronze medal – third place	1950 Copenhagen	C-2 1000 m

Men's canoe slalom

Canoe Slalom World Championships
Gold medal – first place	1957 Augsburg	C-2 team
Silver medal – second place	1951 Steyr	C-2 team
Silver medal – second place	1957 Augsburg	C-2
Silver medal – second place	1959 Geneva	C-2
Silver medal – second place	1959 Geneva	C-2 team
Bronze medal – third place	1951 Steyr	C-2
Bronze medal – third place	1953 Meran	C-2 team

Václav Havel (5 October 1920 – 14 December 1979) was a Czechoslovak slalom and sprint canoeist who competed from the late 1940s to the late 1950s. He was born in Prague (where he also died).

Havel won a silver medal in the C-2 10,000 m event at the 1948 Summer Olympics in London. He also won a bronze medal in the C-2 1,000 m event at the 1950 ICF Canoe Sprint World Championships in Copenhagen.

He also competed in slalom canoeing, winning seven medals at the ICF Canoe Slalom World Championships. This included a gold (C-2 team: 1957), four silvers (C-2: 1957, 1959; C-2 team: 1951, 1959) and two bronzes (C-2: 1951, C-2 team: 1953).
