= Jean Sennelier =

French slalom canoeist

Medal record

Men's canoe slalom

Representing France

World Championships
| Silver medal – second place | 1981 Bala | C-1 team |
| Silver medal – second place | 1987 Bourg St.-Maurice | C-1 team |
| Bronze medal – third place | 1981 Bala | C-1 |

Jean Sennelier is a French slalom canoeist who competed from the late 1970s to the late 1980s. He won three medals at the ICF Canoe Slalom World Championships with two silvers (C-1 team: 1981, 1987) and a bronze (C-1: 1981).
