= Borut Justin =

Yugoslav canoeist

Medal record

Men's canoe slalom

Representing Yugoslavia

World Championships
Gold medal – first place	1963 Spittal	Mixed C-2
Silver medal – second place	1965 Spittal	C-2 team

Borut Justin is a retired slalom canoeist who competed for Yugoslavia from the late 1950s to the mid-1960s. He won two medals at the ICF Canoe Slalom World Championships with a gold in 1963 (Mixed C-2) and a silver in 1965 (C-2 team).
