= Hervé Madore =

Medal record

Men's canoe slalom

Representing France

World Championships
Silver medal – second place	1981 Bala	C-1 team

Hervé Madore (born 29 June 1953) is a former French slalom canoeist who competed from the mid-1970s to the mid-1980s. He won a silver medal in the C-1 team event at the 1981 ICF Canoe Slalom World Championships in Bala.
