= Stanislav Jánský =

Medal record

Men's canoe slalom

Representing Czechoslovakia

World Championships
Gold medal – first place	1953 Meran	C-1 team

Stanislav Jánský is a former Czechoslovak slalom canoeist who competed in the 1950s. He won a gold medal in the C-1 team event at the 1953 ICF Canoe Slalom World Championships in Meran.
