= Klaus Gürtelbauer =

Austrian slalom canoeist

Medal record

Men's canoe slalom

Representing Austria

World Championships
| Bronze medal – third place | 1963 Spittal | C-2 team |

Klaus Gürtelbauer is an Austrian retired slalom canoeist who competed in the mid-1960s. He won a bronze medal in the C-2 team event at the 1963 ICF Canoe Slalom World Championships in Spittal.
