= Jean Dreux =

French canoeist

Medal record

Men's canoe slalom

Representing France

World Championships
Gold medal – first place	1951 Steyr	C-2 team

Jean Dreux is a retired slalom canoeist who competed for France in the 1950s. He won a gold medal in the C-2 team event at the 1951 ICF Canoe Slalom World Championships in Steyr.
