= John Sweet (canoeist) =

American whitewater canoeist

Personal information
- Full name: John Robert Sweet
- Born: 1938 (age 87–88)
Medal record
Men's canoe slalom
Representing United States
World Championships
Silver medal – second place	1981 Bala	Mixed C-2

John Robert Sweet (born 1938) is a former American slalom canoeist who competed from the late 1960s to the early 1980s. He won a silver medal in the mixed C-2 event at the 1981 ICF Canoe Slalom World Championships in Bala, Gwynedd, Wales.

Dr. Sweet earned his PhD in chemistry from Pennsylvania State University. After earning this degree, Dr. Sweet performed material science research at Penn State, and later started a business supplying canoe building materials.

Dr. Sweet was the first paddler to run a 14-foot drop on the Gauley River in West Virginia. He ran it in a C-1, a single-seat decked canoes equipped with a kayak-like spray skirt. Since Dr. Sweet ran it in 1968, it has been called "Sweet's Falls".

Dr. Sweet has a long history of cave exploration, including exploring Butler Cave beginning in 1959. His involvement with Butler Cave and the Butler Cave Conservation Society continues through at least 2007.

Dr. Sweet had been the Faculty Advisor of the Penn State Outing Club at Pennsylvania State University.

On September 19, 2020, Dr. Sweet and Dr. Martha Mary Teeter (also a former competitive paddler) of Davis, California, married.
