= Milan Kný =

Medal record

Men's canoe slalom

Representing Czechoslovakia

World Championships
Silver medal – second place	1959 Geneva	C-2 team

Milan Kný is a retired Czechoslovak slalom canoeist who competed from the late 1950s to the mid-1960s. He won a silver medal in the C-2 team event at the 1959 ICF Canoe Slalom World Championships in Geneva.
