= Urs Steinmann =

Swiss canoeist

Medal record

Men's canoe slalom

Representing Switzerland

World Championships
Silver medal – second place	1981 Bala	K-1 team

Urs Steinmann is a former Swiss slalom canoeist who competed in the 1980s. He won a silver medal in the K-1 team event at the 1981 ICF Canoe Slalom World Championships in Bala.
