= Jan Pára =

Retired Czechoslovak Canoeist

Sport
- Sport: Kayaking
- Event: Folding kayak
Medal record
Men's canoe slalom
Representing Czechoslovakia
World Championships
Silver medal – second place	1957 Augsburg	Folding K-1 team
Silver medal – second place	1959 Geneva	Folding K-1 team

Jan Pára is a retired Czechoslovak slalom canoeist who competed from the late 1950s to the mid-1960s. He won two silver medals in the folding K-1 team event at the ICF Canoe Slalom World Championships, earning them in 1957 and 1959.
