= Vossler =

Vossler is a surname. Notable people with the surname include:

- Ernie Vossler (1928–2013), American golfer
- Karl Vossler (1872–1949), German linguist and scholar
- Otto Vossler (1900−1987), German historian
