= 1989 ICF Canoe Slalom World Championships =

Canoe slalom event in Garrett County, Maryland

Coordinates: 39.50136°N 79.10969°W

The 1989 ICF Canoe Slalom World Championships were held on Savage River in Garrett County, Maryland (western part of the state) near Pittsburgh in the United States under the auspices of the International Canoe Federation. It was the 21st edition. It was the first time the championships were held in the United States. Italy won its first ever medal at these championships.

== Medal summary ==
=== Men's ===
==== Canoe ====
Event	Gold	Points	Silver	Points	Bronze	Points
C1	Jon Lugbill (USA)	205.04	David Hearn (USA)	217.01	Thierry Humeau (FRA)	226.52
C1 team	United States; Jon Lugbill; David Hearn; Jed Prentice	242.50	France; Thierry Humeau; Jacky Avril; Thierry Lepeltier	263.21	Yugoslavia; Borut Javornik; Jože Vidmar; Boštjan Žitnik	288.80
C2	West Germany; Frank Hemmer; Thomas Loose	237.55	Czechoslovakia; Jan Petříček; Tomáš Petříček	243.21	France; Emmanuel del Rey; Thierry Saidi	248.54
C2 team	France; Emmanuel del Rey & Thierry Saidi; Michel Saidi & Jérôme Daval; Gilles Lelievre & Jérôme Daille	286.72	Czechoslovakia; Jiří Rohan & Miroslav Šimek; Jan Petříček & Tomáš Petříček; Miroslav Hajdučík & Milan Kučera	297.76	West Germany; Frank Hemmer & Thomas Loose; Frank Becker & Martin Fröhlke; Stephan Bittner & Volker Nerlich	333.52

==== Kayak ====
Event	Gold	Points	Silver	Points	Bronze	Points
K1	Richard Fox (GBR)	198.61	Gilles Clouzeau (FRA)	203.28	Jernej Abramič (YUG)	203.39
K1 team	Yugoslavia; Jernej Abramič; Marjan Štrukelj; Albin Čižman	228.05	Italy; Marco Caldera; Pierpaolo Ferrazzi; Ettore Ivaldi	232.77	West Germany; Michael Seibert; Thomas Hilger; Martin Hemmer	238.28

=== Women's ===
==== Kayak ====
Event	Gold	Points	Silver	Points	Bronze	Points
K1	Myriam Jerusalmi (FRA)	234.80	Dana Chladek (USA)	238.98	Cathy Hearn (USA)	244.20
K1 team	France; Myriam Jerusalmi; Marie-Françoise Grange-Prigent; Anne Boixel	271.67	United States; Dana Chladek; Cathy Hearn; Jennifer Stone	292.54	Czechoslovakia; Zdenka Grossmannová; Štěpánka Hilgertová; Marcela Hilgertová	327.70

== Medals table ==
Rank	Nation	Gold	Silver	Bronze	Total
1	France (FRA)	3	2	2	7
2	United States (USA)	2	3	1	6
3	West Germany (FRG)	1	0	2	3
3	Yugoslavia (YUG)	1	0	2	3
5	Great Britain (GBR)	1	0	0	1
6	Czechoslovakia (TCH)	0	2	1	3
7	Italy (ITA)	0	1	0	1
Totals (7 entries)		8	8	8	24
