= 1951 ICF Canoe Slalom World Championships =

Canoe slalom event in Steyr, Austria

The 1951 ICF Canoe Slalom World Championships were held in Steyr, Austria under the auspices of International Canoe Federation. It was the 2nd edition.

== Note ==
Only two teams competed in the men's C1 team event.

== Medal summary ==
=== Men's ===
==== Canoe ====
Event	Gold	Points	Silver	Points	Bronze	Points
C1	Charles Dussuet (SUI)	251.6	Jaroslav Váňa (TCH)	260.8	Jacques Marsigny (FRA)	301.5
C1 team	Czechoslovakia; Václav Nič; Jaroslav Váňa; Jan Pecka	846.8	France; Jacques Marsigny; Roger Paris; Pierre Biehler	985.4	-	
C2	France; Claude Neveu; Roger Paris	274.2	France; Jacques Musson; André Pean	286.6	Czechoslovakia; Václav Havel; Jiří Pecka	346.9
C2 team	France; Pierre d'Alençon & Jean Dreux; Jacques Musson & André Pean; Claude Neveu & Roger Paris	985.0	Czechoslovakia; Václav Nič & Jan Šulc; Bohuslav Fiala & Bohumil Berdych; Václav Havel & Jiří Pecka	1114.8	Switzerland; Charles Dussuet & Deglise Melle; Pierre Dufour & R. Esseiva; Jean-Paul Rössinger & R. Junod	1341.0

==== Kayak ====
Event	Gold	Points	Silver	Points	Bronze	Points
Folding K1	Hans Frühwirth (AUT)	184.2	Rudolf Pillwein (AUT)	201.0	Rudolf Sausgruber (AUT)	208.0
Folding K1 team	Austria; Hans Frühwirth; Rudolf Pillwein; Othmar Eiterer	646.6	West Germany; Albert Krais; Ernst Sonntag; Erich Seidel	705.3	Switzerland; Eduard Kunz; Werner Zimmermann; Jean Engler	766.1

=== Women's ===
==== Kayak ====
Event	Gold	Points	Silver	Points	Bronze	Points
Folding K1	Gerti Pertlwieser (AUT)	235.6	Fritzi Schwingl (AUT)	249.0	Anni Reifinger (FRG)	287.5
Folding K1 team	Austria; Gerti Pertlwieser; Fritzi Schwingl; Heidi Pillwein	774.5	West Germany; Anni Reifinger; Liesl Fischer; Anni Anwander	839.3	Switzerland; Eva Speck; Elsa Oderholz; Madeleine Zimmermann	1069.2

== Medals table ==
Rank	Nation	Gold	Silver	Bronze	Total
1	Austria (AUT)	4	2	1	7
2	France (FRA)	2	2	1	5
3	Czechoslovakia (TCH)	1	2	1	4
4	Switzerland (SUI)	1	0	3	4
5	West Germany (FRG)	0	2	1	3
Totals (5 entries)		8	8	7	23
