= Thierry Junquet =

French slalom canoeist

Medal record

Men's canoe slalom

Representing France

World Championships
Bronze medal – third place	1981 Bala	K-1 team

Thierry Junquet is a former French slalom canoeist who competed from the late 1970s to the early 1980s. He won a bronze medal in the K-1 team event at the 1981 ICF Canoe Slalom World Championships in Bala.
