= Milan Zadel =

Yugoslav slalom canoeist

Personal information
- Born: 16 April 1930 Ljubljana
- Died: 7 September 2018 (aged 88)

Sport
- Sport: Kayaking
- Event: Folding kayak
Medal record
Men's canoe slalom
Representing Yugoslavia
World Championships
Bronze medal – third place	1953 Meran	Folding K-1

Milan Zadel (16 April 1930 – 7 September 2018) was a Yugoslav slalom canoeist who competed in the mid-to-late 1950s. He won a bronze medal in the folding K-1 event at the 1953 ICF Canoe Slalom World Championships in Meran. Zadel was born in Ljubljana on 16 April 1930, and died on 7 September 2018, at the age of 88.
