= Manfred Vogt =

West German slalom canoeist

Sport
- Sport: Kayaking
- Event: Folding kayak
Medal record
Men's canoe slalom
Representing West Germany
World Championships
Gold medal – first place	1955 Tacen	Folding K-1 team
Gold medal – first place	1957 Augsburg	Folding K-1
Gold medal – first place	1965 Spittal	K-1 team
Bronze medal – third place	1957 Augsburg	Folding K-1 team
Bronze medal – third place	1959 Geneva	Folding K-1 team

Manfred Vogt is a West German retired slalom canoeist who competed in the 1950s and the 1960s. He won five medals at the ICF Canoe Slalom World Championships with three golds (Folding K-1: 1957, Folding K-1 team: 1955, K-1 team: 1965) and two bronzes (Folding K-1 team: 1957, 1959).
