= Walter Kirschbaum =

Sport
- Sport: Kayaking
- Event: Folding kayak
Medal record
Men's slalom canoeing
Representing West Germany
World Championships
Gold medal – first place	1953 Meran	Folding K-1

Walter Kirschbaum is a retired West German slalom canoeist who competed in the early-to-mid 1950s. He won a gold medal in the folding K-1 event at the 1953 ICF Canoe Slalom World Championships in Meran.
