= Robert Fabian (canoeist) =

Austrian slalom canoeist

Medal record

Men's canoe slalom

Representing Austria

World Championships
Silver medal – second place	1955 Tacen	Folding K-1 team
Bronze medal – third place	1965 Spittal	K-1 team

Robert Fabian is a retired Austrian slalom canoeist who competed from the mid-1950s to the late 1960s. He won two medals at the ICF Canoe Slalom World Championships with a silver in 1955 (Folding K-1 team) and a bronze in 1965 (K-1 team).
