= Eduard Kunz (canoeist) =

Swiss slalom canoeist (1929–2020)

Sport
- Sport: Kayaking
- Event: Folding kayak
Medal record
Men's canoe slalom
Representing Switzerland
World Championships
Gold medal – first place	1949 Geneva	Folding K-1 team
Bronze medal – third place	1951 Steyr	Folding K-1 team

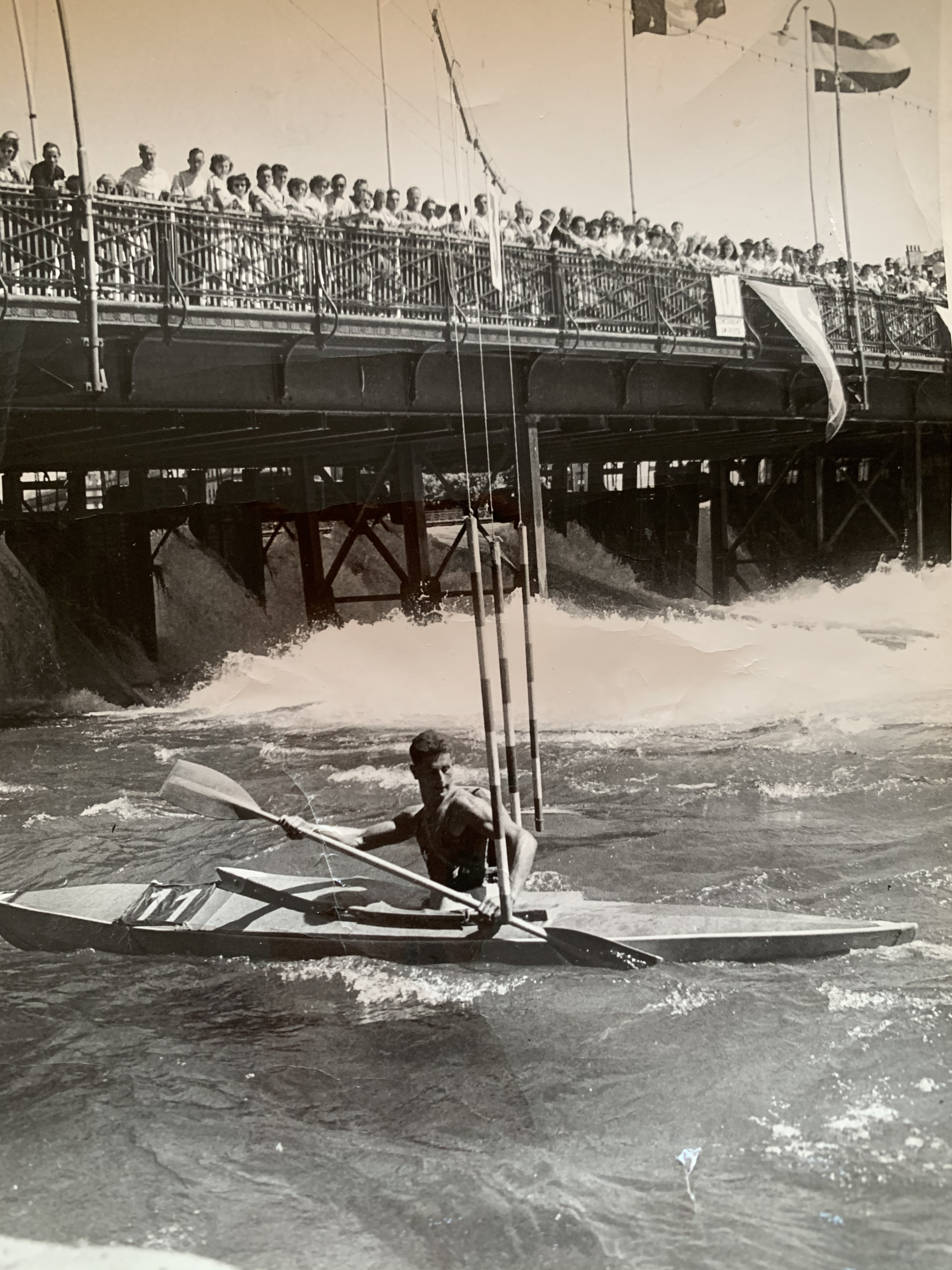
Eduard Kunz at the world championship

Eduard Kunz (March 3, 1929 – November 18, 2020) was a former Swiss slalom canoeist who competed in the 1940s and the 1950s. He won two medals in the folding K-1 team event at the ICF Canoe Slalom World Championships with a gold in 1949 and a bronze in 1951.
