= Othmar Eiterer =

Austrian retired slalom canoeist

Sport
- Sport: Kayaking
- Event: Folding kayak
Medal record
Men's slalom canoeing
Representing Austria
World Championships
Gold medal – first place	1949 Geneva	Folding K-1
Gold medal – first place	1951 Steyr	Folding K-1 team

Othmar Eiterer is an Austrian retired slalom canoeist who competed in the 1940s and the 1950s. He won two gold medals at the ICF Canoe Slalom World Championships, earning them in 1949 (Folding K-1) and 1951 (Folding K-1 team).
