= Gilles Clouzeau =

French slalom canoeist

Medal record

Men's canoe slalom

Representing France

World Championships
Gold medal – first place	1991 Tacen	K1 team
Silver medal – second place	1989 Savage River	K1

Gilles Clouzeau is a French slalom canoeist who competed in the late 1980s and early 1990s. He won two medals at the ICF Canoe Slalom World Championships with a gold (K1 team: 1991) and a silver (K1: 1989).

== World Cup individual podiums ==
Season	Date	Venue	Position	Event
1991	30 Jun 1991	Mezzana	3rd	K1
