= Martin Rohleder =

John Martin Robert Rohleder
Personal information
- Born: 1943 Bucklow, England
- Died: 3 November 1963 War Memorial Hospital, Wrexham, Wales

Sport
- Sport: Kayaking
- Event: Folding kayak
Medal record
Men's canoe slalom
Representing Great Britain
World Championships
Bronze medal – third place	1963 Spittal	Folding K-1 team

Martin Rohleder (1943 – 3 November 1963) was a British retired slalom canoeist who competed in the early-to-mid 1960s. He won a bronze medal in the folding K-1 team event at the 1963 ICF Canoe Slalom World Championships in Spittal. Rohleder was from Altrincham.

Rohleder died in an accident on 3 November 1963, aged 20. A memorial trophy in his name was inaugurated the following year.
