= Bronisław Waruś =

Polish canoeist

Sport
- Sport: Kayaking
- Event: Folding kayak
Medal record
Men's canoe slalom
Representing Poland
World Championships
Silver medal – second place	1963 Spittal	Folding K-1 team

Bronisław Waruś is a Polish former slalom canoeist who competed from the late 1950s to the mid-1960s. He won a silver medal in the folding K-1 team event at the 1963 ICF Canoe Slalom World Championships in Spittal.
