= Reinhard Sens =

Sport
- Sport: Kayaking
- Event: Folding kayak
Medal record
Men's canoe slalom
Representing East Germany
World Championships
Gold medal – first place	1957 Augsburg	Folding K-1 team

Reinhard Sens is a former East German slalom canoeist who competed in the 1950s. He won a gold medal in the folding K-1 team event at the 1957 ICF Canoe Slalom World Championships in Augsburg.
