= Susan Small (canoeist) =

Medal record

Women's canoe slalom

Representing Great Britain

World Championships
Silver medal – second place	1981 Bala	K-1 team

Susan Small is a former British slalom canoeist who competed in the late 1970s and the early 1980s. She won a silver medal in the K-1 team event at the 1981 ICF Canoe Slalom World Championships in Bala.
