= Franz Grafetsberger =

Austrian canoeist

Sport
- Sport: Kayaking
- Event: Folding kayak
Medal record
Men's canoe slalom
Representing Austria
World Championships
| Gold medal – first place | 1953 Meran | Folding K-1 team |

Franz Grafetsberger is a retired slalom canoeist who competed for Austria in the 1950s. He won a gold medal in the folding K-1 team event at the 1953 ICF Canoe Slalom World Championships in Meran.
