= Jean-Yves Prigent =

French slalom canoeist (born 1954)

Medal record

Men's canoe slalom

Representing France

World Championships
Gold medal – first place	1977 Spittal	K1 team
Bronze medal – third place	1981 Bala	K1
Bronze medal – third place	1981 Bala	K1 team

Jean-Yves Prigent (born 1954) is a French slalom canoeist who competed at the international level from 1976 to 1983. He won a three medals at the ICF Canoe Slalom World Championships with a gold (K1 team: 1977) and two bronzes (K1: 1981; K1 team: 1981). His son Yves and his daughter Camille have also competed in canoe slalom. In 2024 he was convicted of sexually assaulting two teenagers, and was implicated in another case of rape and sexual assault of minors.
