= Nicolas Wain =

British slalom canoeist

Medal record

Men's canoe slalom

Representing Great Britain

World Championships
Gold medal – first place	1981 Bala	K-1 team

Nicolas Wain is a British former slalom canoeist who competed from the mid-1970s to the early 1980s.

He won a gold medal in the K-1 team event at the 1981 ICF Canoe Slalom World Championships in Bala.
