= Albert Krais =

West German slalom canoeist

Sport
- Sport: Kayaking
- Event: Folding kayak
Medal record
Men's canoe slalom
Representing West Germany
World Championships
Silver medal – second place	1951 Steyr	Folding K-1 team

Albert Krais is a retired West German slalom canoeist who competed in the early-to-mid 1950s. He won a silver medal in the folding K-1 team event at the 1951 ICF Canoe Slalom World Championships in Steyr.
