= Hans Hunziker (canoeist) =

Swiss canoeist

Medal record

Men's slalom canoeing

Representing Switzerland

World Championships
Bronze medal – third place	1967 Lipno	K-1

Hans Hunziker is a retired Swiss slalom canoeist who competed in the late 1960s. He won a bronze medal in the K-1 event at the 1967 ICF Canoe Slalom World Championships in Lipno nad Vltavou.
