= Ettore Ivaldi =

Italian canoeist

Medal record

Men's canoe slalom

Representing Italy

World Championships
Silver medal – second place	1989 Savage River	K-1 team

Ettore Ivaldi is a former Italian slalom canoeist who competed from the mid-1980s to the mid-1990s. He won a silver medal in the K-1 team event at the 1989 ICF Canoe Slalom World Championships in Savage River.
