= Geoffrey Dinsdale =

British retired slalom canoeist

Medal record

Men's slalom canoeing

Representing Great Britain

World Championships
Bronze medal – third place	1963 Spittal	Folding K-1 team

Geoffrey Dinsdale (born 24 July 1942) is a British retired slalom canoeist who competed in the 1960s and 1970s. He won a bronze medal in the folding K-1 team event at the 1963 in Spittal. Dinsdale also finished 21st in the C-1 event at the 1972 Summer Olympics in Munich.
