= Helmuth Setzkorn =

East German slalom canoeist

Sport
- Sport: Kayaking
- Event: Folding kayak
Medal record
Men's canoe slalom
Representing East Germany
World Championships
Silver medal – second place	1953 Meran	Folding K-1 team

Helmuth Setzkorn is a retired East German slalom canoeist who competed in the mid-1950s. He won a silver medal in the folding K-1 team event at the 1953 ICF Canoe Slalom World Championships in Meran.
