= David Mitchell (canoeist) =

British retired slalom canoeist (born 1943)

Medal record

Men's slalom canoeing

Representing Great Britain

World Championships
Silver medal – second place	1967 Lipno	K-1
Bronze medal – third place	1963 Spittal	Folding K-1 team

Arthur David Mitchell (born 5 February 1943) is a British retired slalom canoeist who competed in the 1960s and the 1970s. He won two medals at the ICF Canoe Slalom World Championships, with a silver in 1967 (K-1) and a bronze in 1963 Spittal (Folding K-1 team).

Mitchell also finished 22nd in the K-1 event at the 1972 Summer Olympics in Munich.

Mitchell holds the record for the most consecutive British National Titles with 6, and has a total of 8.

After retiring from racing in 1975 Mitchell coached the United States from 1977 to 1992. In 1967 Mitchell began his course designing career that he continued through 2000, with his last course being the Sydney Olympic course. He designed the course for the 1996 and 2000 Olympics and many World Championships.

Mitchell also has an extensive collection of wild water medals.
