= Jerzy Stanuch =

Medal record

Men's canoe slalom

Representing Poland

World Championships
Silver medal – second place	1973 Muotathal	K1 team
Silver medal – second place	1975 Skopje	K1 team
Bronze medal – third place	1977 Spittal	K1 team

Jerzy Zbigniew Stanuch (born 17 May 1953 in Nowy Sącz) is a former Polish slalom canoeist who competed at the international level from 1971 to 1978.

He won three medals in the K1 team event at the ICF Canoe Slalom World Championships with two silvers (1973, 1975) and a bronze (1977). He finished 14th in the K1 event at the 1972 Summer Olympics in Munich.

Stanuch's daughter Agnieszka also competed in canoe slalom for Poland.
