= Hans Herbist =

Austrian slalom canoeist

Sport
- Sport: Kayaking
- Event: Folding kayak
Medal record
Men's canoe slalom
Representing Austria
World Championships
Gold medal – first place	1953 Meran	Folding K-1 team

Hans Herbist is an Austrian former slalom canoeist who competed in the 1950s. He won a gold medal in the folding K-1 team event at the 1953 ICF Canoe Slalom World Championships in Meran.
