= Ulrich Peters (canoeist) =

Medal record

Men's canoe slalom

Representing West Germany

World Championships
Gold medal – first place	1975 Skopje	K-1 team
Silver medal – second place	1975 Skopje	K-1
Bronze medal – third place	1969 Bourg St.-Maurice	K-1 team
Bronze medal – third place	1971 Meran	K-1
Bronze medal – third place	1971 Meran	K-1 team

Ulrich Peters (born 3 June 1951 in Schwerte, North Rhine-Westphalia) is a former West German slalom canoeist who competed in the 1960s and 1970s.

He won five medals at the ICF Canoe Slalom World Championships with a gold (K-1 team: 1975), a silver (K-1: 1975) and three bronzes (K-1: 1971; K-1 team: 1969, 1971).

Peters finished fourth in the K-1 event at the 1972 Summer Olympics in Munich. His niece, Violetta, won a bronze in the women's K-1 event at the 2008 Summer Olympics in Beijing representing Austria. His brother Wolfgang is also a former slalom canoeist.
