= Alois Würfmannsdobler =

West German slalom canoeist

Sport
- Sport: Kayaking
- Event: Folding kayak
Medal record
Men's canoe slalom
Representing West Germany
World Championships
Gold medal – first place	1955 Tacen	Folding K-1 team

Alois Würfmannsdobler is a West German former slalom canoeist who competed in the 1950s. He won a gold medal in the folding K-1 team event at the 1955 ICF Canoe Slalom World Championships in Tacen.
