= Dieter Förstl =

German canoeist

Medal record

Men's canoe slalom

Representing West Germany

World Championships
Gold medal – first place	1975 Skopje	K-1 team
Silver medal – second place	1977 Spittal	K-1

Dieter Förstl is a former slalom canoeist who competed for West Germany in the 1970s. He won two medals at the ICF Canoe Slalom World Championships with a gold (K-1 team: 1975) and a silver (K-1: 1977).
