= Jürgen Bremer =

East German canoeist

Medal record

Men's slalom canoeing

Representing East Germany

World Championships
Gold medal – first place	1963 Spittal	Folding K-1
Gold medal – first place	1967 Lipno	K-1
Gold medal – first place	1967 Lipno	K-1 team
Silver medal – second place	1971 Meran	K-1 team

Jürgen Bremer (born 26 September 1940 in Bützow) is an East German retired slalom canoeist who competed from the early 1960s to the early 1970s. He won four medals at the ICF Canoe Slalom World Championships, with three golds (folding K-1: 1963, K-1: 1967, K-1 team: 1967) and a silver (K-1 team: 1971).

Bremer also finished eighth in the K-1 event at the 1972 Summer Olympics in Munich.
