= Stanisław Majerczak =

Polish canoeist

Medal record

Men's canoe slalom

Representing Poland

World Championships
Silver medal – second place	1973 Muotathal	K-1 team
Silver medal – second place	1975 Skopje	K-1 team

Stanisław Majerczak is a former Polish slalom canoeist who competed in the 1970s. He won two silver medals in the K-1 team event at the ICF Canoe Slalom World Championships, earning them in 1973 and 1975.
