= Jürgen Gerlach (canoeist) =

German canoeist (born 1948)

Medal record

Men's canoe slalom

Representing West Germany

World Championships
Bronze medal – third place	1969 Bourg St.-Maurice	K-1 team
Bronze medal – third place	1971 Meran	K-1 team

Jürgen Gerlach (born 23 December 1948 in Castrop-Rauxel) is a West German retired slalom canoeist who competed in the 1960s and the 1970s. He won two bronze medals in the K-1 team event at the ICF Canoe Slalom World Championships, earning them in 1969 and 1971.

Gerlach also finished 26th in the K-1 event at the 1972 Summer Olympics in Munich.
