= Norbert Sattler =

Austrian kayaker and water slalomist

Medal record

Men's canoe slalom

Representing Austria

Olympic Games
Silver medal – second place	1972 Munich	K-1

World Championships
Gold medal – first place	1971 Meran	K-1 team
Gold medal – first place	1973 Muotathal	K-1
Silver medal – second place	1977 Spittal	K-1 team
Silver medal – second place	1979 Jonquière	K-1 team
Bronze medal – third place	1977 Spittal	K-1

Norbert Sattler (Mauthen, 4 October 1951 – 19 January 2023) was an Austrian slalom canoeist who competed from the late 1960s to the mid-1980s. He won a silver medal in the K-1 event at the 1972 Summer Olympics in Munich.

Sattler also won five medals at the ICF Canoe Slalom World Championships with two golds (K-1: 1973, K-1 team: 1971) two silvers (K-1 team: 1977, 1979) and a bronze (K-1: 1977).
