= Günther Möbius =

East German canoeist

Sport
- Sport: Kayaking
- Event: Folding kayak
Medal record
Men's canoe slalom
Representing East Germany
World Championships
Gold medal – first place	1959 Geneva	Folding K-1 team

Günther Möbius is a former East German slalom canoeist who competed in the 1950s. He won a gold medal in the folding K-1 team event at the 1959 ICF Canoe Slalom World Championships in Geneva.
