= Heinz Bielig =

German canoeist

Sport
- Sport: Kayaking
- Event: Folding kayak
Medal record
Men's slalom canoeing
Representing East Germany
World Championships
Gold medal – first place	1957 Augsburg	Folding K-1 team
Gold medal – first place	1959 Geneva	Folding K-1 team
Bronze medal – third place	1957 Augsburg	Folding K-1
Bronze medal – third place	1959 Geneva	Folding K-1

Heinz Bielig is a retired slalom canoeist who competed for East Germany in the mid-to-late 1950s. He won four medals at the ICF Canoe Slalom World Championships with two golds (Folding K-1 team: 1957, 1959) and two bronzes (Folding K-1: 1957, 1959).
