= Herbert Beck (art historian) =

German art historian and museum director (1941–2026)

Herbert Beck (30 April 1941 – 5 January 2026) was a German art historian and museum director. He was the director of the Liebieghaus and the Städel. Beck died on 5 January 2026, at the age of 84.
