= Yuri Kusuda =

American canoeist

Medal record

Women's canoe slalom

Representing United States

World Championships
Bronze medal – third place	1981 Bala	K-1 team

Yuri Kusuda is a former American slalom canoeist who competed in the 1980s. She won a bronze medal in the K-1 team event at the 1981 ICF Canoe Slalom World Championships in Bala.
