= Thomas Hilger =

German canoeist

Medal record

Men's canoe slalom

Representing West Germany

World Championships
Bronze medal – third place	1989 Savage River	K-1 team

Thomas Hilger is a former West German slalom canoeist who competed from the mid-1980s to the mid-1990s. He won a bronze medal in the K-1 team event at the 1989 ICF Canoe Slalom World Championships in Savage River.
