= Siegbert Horn =

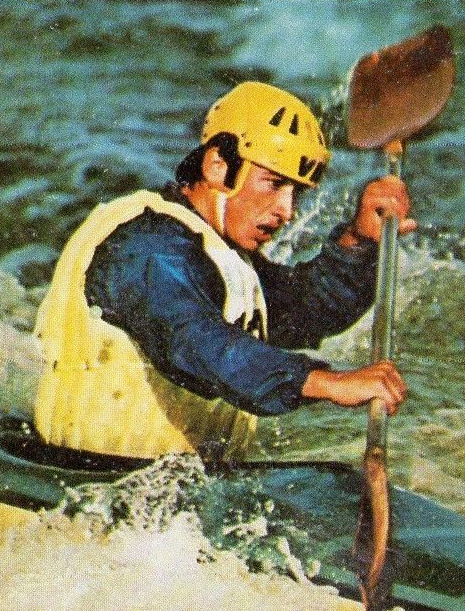
- Siegbert Horn in 1972

Personal information
- Born: 11 May 1950 Hartmannsdorf, East Germany
- Died: 9 August 2016 (aged 66)
- Height: 1.80 m (5 ft 11 in)
- Weight: 74 kg (163 lb)

Sport
- Sport: Slalom canoeing
- Club: ASK Vorwärts Leipzig
Medal record
Representing East Germany
Olympic Games
Gold medal – first place	1972 Munich	K-1
World Championships
Gold medal – first place	1971 Meran	K-1
Gold medal – first place	1973 Muotathal	K-1 team
Gold medal – first place	1975 Skopje	K-1
Silver medal – second place	1971 Meran	K-1 team
Silver medal – second place	1973 Muotathal	K-1
Bronze medal – third place	1975 Skopje	K-1 team

Siegbert Horn (11 May 1950 – 9 August 2016) was a German slalom canoeist who competed in the 1970s. He won a gold medal in the K-1 event at the 1972 Summer Olympics in Munich.

Horn also won six medals at the ICF Canoe Slalom World Championships with three golds (K-1: 1971, 1975; K-1 team: 1973), two silvers (K-1: 1973; K-1 team: 1971), and a bronze (K-1 team: 1975). He died of cancer on 9 August 2016.
