= Zdeněk Matějovský =

Sport
- Sport: Kayaking
- Event: Folding kayak
Medal record
Men's canoe slalom
Representing Czechoslovakia
World Championships
Bronze medal – third place	1955 Tacen	Folding K-1 team

Zdeněk Matějovský is a retired slalom canoeist who competed for Czechoslovakia in the mid-to-late 1950s. He won a bronze medal in the folding K-1 team event at the 1955 ICF Canoe Slalom World Championships in Tacen.
