= Eugen Weimann =

West German slalom canoeist

Medal record

Men's canoe slalom

Representing West Germany

World Championships
Gold medal – first place	1965 Spittal	K-1 team
Silver medal – second place	1967 Lipno	K-1 team

Eugen Weimann is a West German former slalom canoeist who competed in the 1960s. He won two medals in the K-1 team event at the ICF Canoe Slalom World Championships with a gold in 1965 and a silver in 1967.
