= Rudolf Sausgruber =

Austrian canoeist

Sport
- Sport: Kayaking
- Event: Folding kayak
Medal record
Men's slalom canoeing
Representing Austria
World Championships
Gold medal – first place	1953 Meran	Folding K-1 team
Silver medal – second place	1953 Meran	Folding K-1
Bronze medal – third place	1951 Steyr	Folding K-1

Rudolf Sausgruber is an Austrian retired slalom canoeist who competed in the early-to-mid 1950s. He won three medals at the ICF Canoe Slalom World Championships with a gold (Folding K-1 team: 1953), a silver (Folding K-1: 1953) and a bronze (Folding K-1: 1951).
