= Rolf Luber =

Medal record

Men's slalom canoeing

Representing East Germany

World Championships
Gold medal – first place	1963 Spittal	Folding K-1 team
Silver medal – second place	1963 Spittal	Folding K-1
Silver medal – second place	1965 Spittal	K-1 team

Rolf Luber is a retired East German slalom canoeist who competed in the 1960s. He won three medals at the ICF Canoe Slalom World Championships with a gold (Folding K-1 team: 1963) and two silvers (Folding K-1: 1963, K-1 team: 1965).
