= Vogler (surname) =

Vogler is a German occupational surname for someone who was a fowler, or birdcatcher. Notable people with the surname include:

- Albert Vögler (1877–1945), German industrialist
- Andreas Vogler, Swiss architect and designer
- Andreas Vogler (footballer), German footballer
- Bernard Vogler (1935–2020), French historian and academic
- Bert Vogler, South African cricketer
- Brian Vogler (1932–2009), Australian footballer and coal miner
- Candace Vogler, professor of philosophy at the University of Chicago
- Christopher Vogler, American film development executive
- Franz Vogler (b 1944), German skier
- Georg Joseph Vogler (1749–1814), German composer, organist, teacher and theorist
- Heinrich der Vogler, Henry the Fowler
- Jan Vogler (b 1964), German cellist
- Joe Vogler (1913–1993), American politician of the Alaskan Independence Party
- Johann Caspar Vogler (1696–1763), German composer and organist
- Joseph Vogler (1661–1708), German theologian
- Joseph E. Vogler (1913–1993), American politician
- Jürgen Vogler
- Karl Michael Vogler (1928–2009), German actor
- Kathrin Vogler (born 1963), German politician
- Matt Vogler (born 1969), American football player
- Matthias Vogler (born 1981), German politician
- Paul Vogler (1875–1958), Swiss botanist and teacher
- Peter Vogler (born 1964), Australian baseball coach and former player
- Rich Vogler (1950–1990), champion sprint car and midget car driver
- Rüdiger Vogler (born 1942), German film and stage actor
- Werner Vogler, West German slalom canoeist
