= Eberhard Gläser =

East German canoeist

Medal record

Men's slalom canoeing

Representing East Germany

World Championships
Gold medal – first place	1957 Augsburg	Folding K-1 team
Gold medal – first place	1959 Geneva	Folding K-1 team
Gold medal – first place	1961 Hainsberg	Folding K-1
Gold medal – first place	1961 Hainsberg	Folding K-1 team
Gold medal – first place	1963 Spittal	Folding K-1 team
Silver medal – second place	1959 Geneva	Folding K-1
Silver medal – second place	1965 Spittal	K-1
Silver medal – second place	1965 Spittal	K-1 team

Eberhard Gläser is a retired slalom canoeist who competed for East Germany from the late 1950s to the mid-1960s. He won eight medals at the ICF Canoe Slalom World Championships with five golds (Folding K-1: 1961, Folding K-1 team: 1957, 1959, 1961, 1963) and three silvers (Folding K-1: 1959, K-1: 1965, K-1 team: 1965).
