= Fritz Lange (canoeist) =

East German canoe slalom racer

Personal information
- Born: 17 April 1940 (age 86) Weißenfels

Sport
- Sport: Canoeing
- Club: SC DHfK Leipzig
Medal record
Men's canoe slalom
Representing East Germany
World Championships
Gold medal – first place	1963 Spittal	Folding K-1 team
Silver medal – second place	1965 Spittal	K-1 team

Fritz Lange (born 17 April 1940 in Weißenfels) is a former East German slalom canoeist who competed in the 1960s. He won two medals in the K-1 team event at the ICF Canoe Slalom World Championships with a gold in 1963 and a silver in 1965.
