= Zdeněk Košťál =

Personal information
- Born: 1931
- Died: 7 April 2015 (aged 83)

Sport
- Sport: Kayaking
- Event: Folding kayak
Medal record
Men's canoe slalom
Representing Czechoslovakia
World Championships
Silver medal – second place	1959 Geneva	Folding K-1 team
Silver medal – second place	1961 Hainsberg	Folding K-1 team

Zdeněk Košťál (1931 – 7 April 2015) was a slalom canoeist who competed for Czechoslovakia from the late 1950s to the mid-1960s. He won two silver medals in the folding K-1 team event at the ICF Canoe Slalom World Championships, earning them in 1959 and 1961. He died on 7 April 2015, at the age of 83.
