= Claude Peschier =

French slalom canoeist

Medal record

Men's canoe slalom

Representing France

World Championships
Gold medal – first place	1969 Bourg St.-Maurice	K1
Gold medal – first place	1969 Bourg St.-Maurice	K1 team
Bronze medal – third place	1967 Lipno	K1 team
Bronze medal – third place	1973 Muotathal	K1 team

Claude Peschier is a French former slalom canoeist who competed at the international level from 1967 to 1973.

He won four medals at the ICF Canoe Slalom World Championships with two golds (K1: 1969, K1 team: 1969) and two bronzes (K1 team: 1967, 1973).

His two sons Benoît and Nicolas have also competed in canoe slalom.
