= Milo Duffek =

Swiss canoeist

Medal record

Men's canoe slalom

Representing Switzerland

World Championships
Silver medal – second place	1981 Bala	K-1 team
Bronze medal – third place	1979 Jonquière	K-1 team

Milo Duffek Jr. (* 1928 in Počátky, Czechoslovakia + February 25, 2023 in Geneva, Switzerland was a former Swiss slalom canoeist who competed from the mid 1970s to the early 1980s. He won two medals in the K-1 team event at the ICF Canoe Slalom World Championships with a silver in 1981 and a bronze in 1979.
