= Dimitrij Skolil =

Czechoslovak canoeist (died 2023)

Sport
- Sport: Kayaking
- Event: Folding kayak
Medal record
Men's canoe slalom
Representing Czechoslovakia
World Championships
Silver medal – second place	1957 Augsburg	Folding K-1
Silver medal – second place	1957 Augsburg	Folding K-1 team
Bronze medal – third place	1955 Tacen	Folding K-1 team

Dimitrij Skolil (c. 1931 – 11 March 2023) was a Czechoslovak slalom canoeist who competed from the early 1950s to the mid-1960s. He won three medals at the ICF Canoe Slalom World Championships with two silvers (Folding K-1: 1957, Folding K-1 team: 1957) and a bronze (Folding K-1 team: 1955).

Skolil died on 11 March 2023, aged 92.
