= Karl Rath =

German slalom canoeist

Sport
- Sport: Kayaking
- Event: Folding kayak
Medal record
Men's canoe slalom
Representing West Germany
World Championships
Bronze medal – third place	1953 Meran	Folding K-1 team

Karl Bruns (born 1925) is a retired West German slalom canoeist who competed in the early-to-mid 1950s. He won a bronze medal in the folding K-1 team event at the 1953 ICF Canoe Slalom World Championships in Meran.
