= Christian Döring (canoeist) =

East German canoeist

Medal record

Men's canoe slalom

Representing East Germany

World Championships
Gold medal – first place	1967 Lipno	K-1 team
Gold medal – first place	1973 Muotathal	K-1 team
Silver medal – second place	1971 Meran	K-1
Silver medal – second place	1971 Meran	K-1 team
Bronze medal – third place	1975 Skopje	K-1 team

Christian Döring is a retired slalom canoeist who competed for East Germany in the 1960s and 1970s.

He won five medals at the ICF Canoe Slalom World Championships with two golds (K-1 team: 1967, 1973), two silvers (K-1: 1971; K-1 team: 1971) and a bronze (K-1 team: 1975).
