= 1963 ICF Canoe Slalom World Championships =

Canoe slalom event in Spittal, Austria

The 1963 ICF Canoe Slalom World Championships were held in Spittal an der Drau, Austria under the auspices of International Canoe Federation. It was the 8th edition. The women's folding K1 team event resumed after being absent from the program at 1961 championships.

== Medal summary ==
=== Men's ===
==== Canoe ====
Event	Gold	Points	Silver	Points	Bronze	Points
C1	Manfred Schubert (GDR)	361.1	Gert Kleinert (GDR)	378.1	Jean-Claude Tochon (SUI)	382.4
C1 team	East Germany; Manfred Schubert; Gert Kleinert; Karl-Heinz Wozniak	443.5	West Germany; Norbert Schmidt; Otto Stumpf; Heiner Stumpf	580.7	Switzerland; Heinz Grobat; Jean-Claude Tochon; Marcel Roth	613.3
C2	East Germany; Günther Merkel; Manfred Merkel	336.2	Yugoslavia; Natan Bernot; Dare Bernot	342.3	East Germany; Jürgen Noak; Siegfried Lück	343.8
C2 team	East Germany; Günther Merkel & Manfred Merkel; Jürgen Noak & Siegfried Lück; Rudolf Seifert & Manfred Glöckner	479.4	West Germany; Kurt Longrich & Jürgen Hauschild; Hermann Roock & Günter Brümmer; Günther Tuchel & Wolf Dieter Seller	787.4	Austria; Bruno Kerbl & Klaus Gürtelbauer; Anton Biegel & Helmut Schilhuber; Franz Tutschka & Alfred Haberzettl	1657.7

==== Kayak ====
Event	Gold	Points	Silver	Points	Bronze	Points
Folding K1	Jürgen Bremer (GDR)	266.7	Rolf Luber (GDR)	274.5	Jiří Černý (TCH)	299.4
Folding K1 team	East Germany; Eberhard Gläser; Rolf Luber; Fritz Lange	419.4	Poland; Eugeniusz Kapłaniak; Władysław Piecyk; Bronisław Waruś	421.4	United Kingdom; David Mitchell; Geoffrey Dinsdale; Martin Rohleder	473.5

=== Mixed ===
==== Canoe ====
Event	Gold	Points	Silver	Points	Bronze	Points
C2	Yugoslavia; Alenka Bernot; Borut Justin	372.1	East Germany; Margitta Krüger; Werner Lempert	411.2	Czechoslovakia; Vratislava Nováková; Karel Novák	422.7

=== Women's ===
==== Kayak ====
Event	Gold	Points	Silver	Points	Bronze	Points
Folding K1	Ludmila Veberová (TCH)	312.4	Ursula Gläser (GDR)	331.4	Jana Zvěřinová (TCH)	354.0
Folding K1 team	East Germany; Ursula Gläser; Anneliese Bauer; Lia Merkel	400.2	Czechoslovakia; Ludmila Veberová; Jana Zvěřinová; Renata Knýová	401.7	-	

== Medals table ==
Rank	Nation	Gold	Silver	Bronze	Total
1	East Germany (GDR)	7	4	1	12
2	Czechoslovakia (TCH)	1	1	3	5
3	Yugoslavia (YUG)	1	1	0	2
4	West Germany (FRG)	0	2	0	2
5	Poland (POL)	0	1	0	1
6	Switzerland (SUI)	0	0	2	2
7	Austria (AUT)	0	0	1	1
7	Great Britain (GBR)	0	0	1	1
Totals (8 entries)		9	9	8	26
