= Albert Kerr (canoeist) =

British canoeist

Medal record

Men's canoe slalom

Representing Great Britain

World Championships
Gold medal – first place	1977 Spittal	K-1
Gold medal – first place	1979 Jonquière	K-1 team
Gold medal – first place	1981 Bala	K-1 team

Albert Kerr is a British slalom canoeist who competed in the 1970s and 1980s.

He won a gold medal in the K-1 event at the 1977 ICF Canoe Slalom World Championships in Spittal. He also won two world championship golds in the K-1 team event in 1979 and 1981.
