= Jürg Götz =

Swiss canoeist

Medal record

Men's canoe slalom

Representing Switzerland

World Championships
Silver medal – second place	1981 Bala	K-1 team

Jürg Götz, also spelled Juerg Goetz, is a former Swiss slalom canoeist who competed from the mid-1970s to the mid-1980s. He won a silver medal in the K-1 team event at the 1981 ICF Canoe Slalom World Championships in Bala.
