= Volkmar Fleischer =

East German canoeist

Medal record

Men's canoe slalom

Representing East Germany

World Championships
Gold medal – first place	1967 Lipno	K-1 team

Volkmar Fleischer is a former slalom canoeist who competed for East Germany in the 1960s.

He won a gold medal in the K-1 team event at the 1967 ICF Canoe Slalom World Championships in Lipno.
