= 1981 ICF Canoe Slalom World Championships =

Canoe slalom event in Bala, Wales, Great Britain

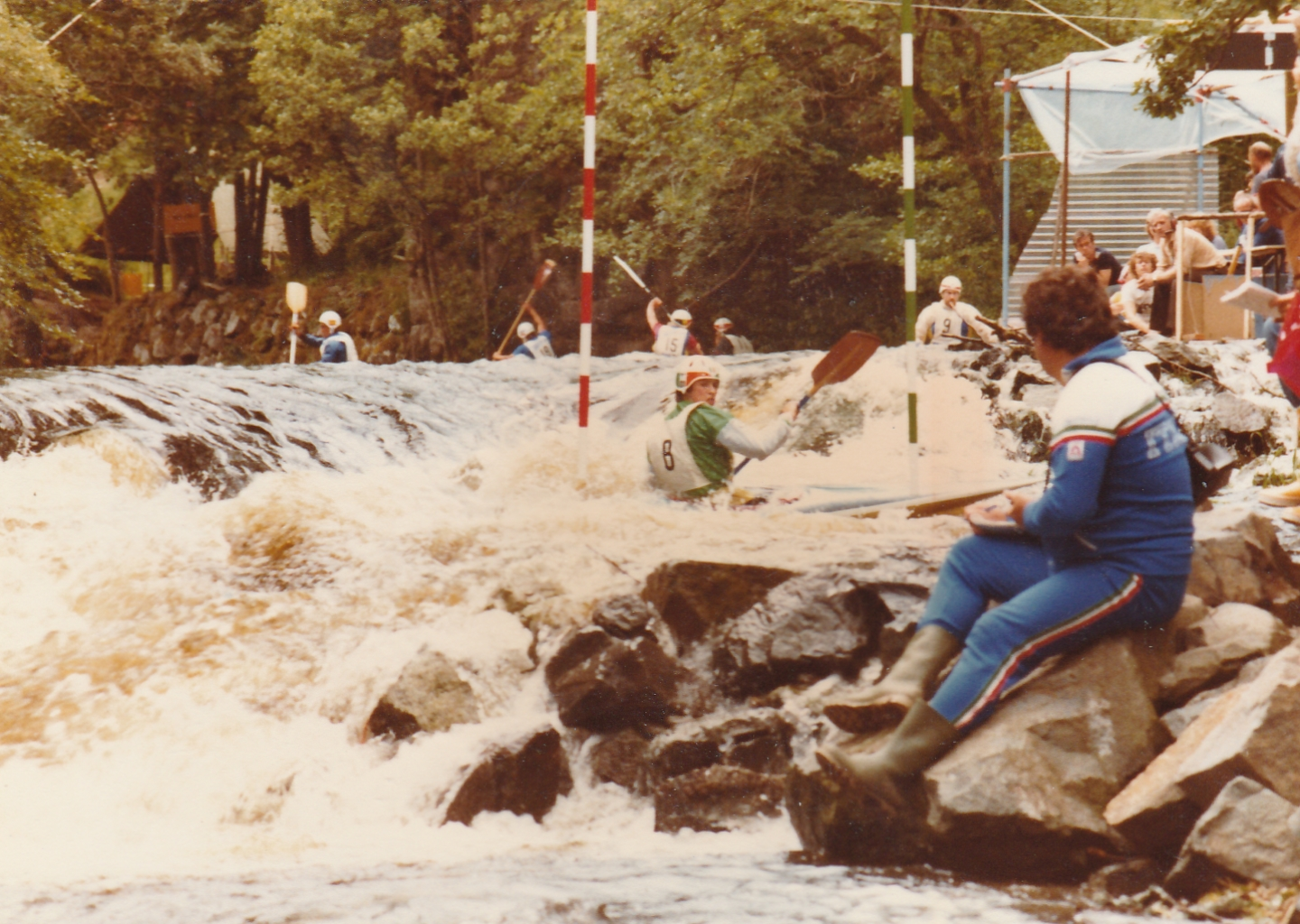
Competitors at the event

The 1981 ICF Canoe Slalom World Championships were held in Bala, Wales, Great Britain from July 15-24 under the auspices of the International Canoe Federation. It was the 17th edition. The mixed C2 event was reinstated after not being held at the previous championships.

== Medal summary ==
=== Men's ===
==== Canoe ====
Event	Gold	Points	Silver	Points	Bronze	Points
C1	Jon Lugbill (USA)	234.58	David Hearn (USA)	234.92	Jean Sennelier (FRA)	246.27
C1 team	United States; Jon Lugbill; David Hearn; Ron Lugbill	251.02	France; Hervé Madore; Jean Sennelier; Jean Salamé	292.69	West Germany; Gerald Moos; Fredi Zimmermann; Jürgen Schnitzerling	333.38
C2	United States; Steve Garvis; Mike Garvis	264.23	West Germany; Dieter Welsink; Peter Czupryna	271.68	United States; Paul Grabow; Jefry Huey	272.78
C2 team	United Kingdom; Jock Young & Alistair Munro; Robert Joce & Robert Owen; Eric Jamieson & Robin Williams	338.17	Poland; Wojciech Kudlik & Jerzy Jeż; Marek Maslanka & Ryszard Seruga; Zbigniew Czaja & Jacek Kasprzycki	356.30	United States; Carl Gutschick & Paul Flack; Paul Grabow & Jefry Huey; Steve Garvis & Mike Garvis	395.14

==== Kayak ====
Event	Gold	Points	Silver	Points	Bronze	Points
K1	Richard Fox (GBR)	211.94	Luboš Hilgert (TCH)	214.35	Jean-Yves Prigent (FRA)	219.58
K1 team	United Kingdom; Richard Fox; Albert Kerr; Nicolas Wain	246.55	Switzerland; Jürg Götz; Urs Steinmann; Milo Duffek	251.58	France; Jean-Yves Prigent; Thierry Junquet; Bernard Renault	252.37

=== Mixed ===
==== Canoe ====
Event	Gold	Points	Silver	Points	Bronze	Points
C2	United States; Elizabeth Hayman; Fritz Haller	355.12	United States; Barbara McKee; John Sweet	442.58	United States; Karen Marte; Brett Sorensen	464.39

=== Women's ===
==== Kayak ====
Event	Gold	Points	Silver	Points	Bronze	Points
K1	Ulrike Deppe (FRG)	257.69	Cathy Hearn (USA)	262.79	Jocelyne Roupioz (FRA)	270.10
K1 team	West Germany; Ulrike Deppe; Susanne Erbers; Gabriele Köllmann	303.10	United Kingdom; Elizabeth Sharman; Jane Roderick; Susan Small	326.80	United States; Linda Harrison; Cathy Hearn; Yuri Kusuda	333.69

== Medals table ==
Rank	Nation	Gold	Silver	Bronze	Total
1	United States (USA)	4	3	4	11
2	Great Britain (GBR)	3	1	0	4
3	West Germany (FRG)	2	1	1	4
4	France (FRA)	0	1	4	5
5	Czechoslovakia (TCH)	0	1	0	1
5	Poland (POL)	0	1	0	1
5	Switzerland (SUI)	0	1	0	1
Totals (7 entries)		9	9	9	27

== Gallery ==
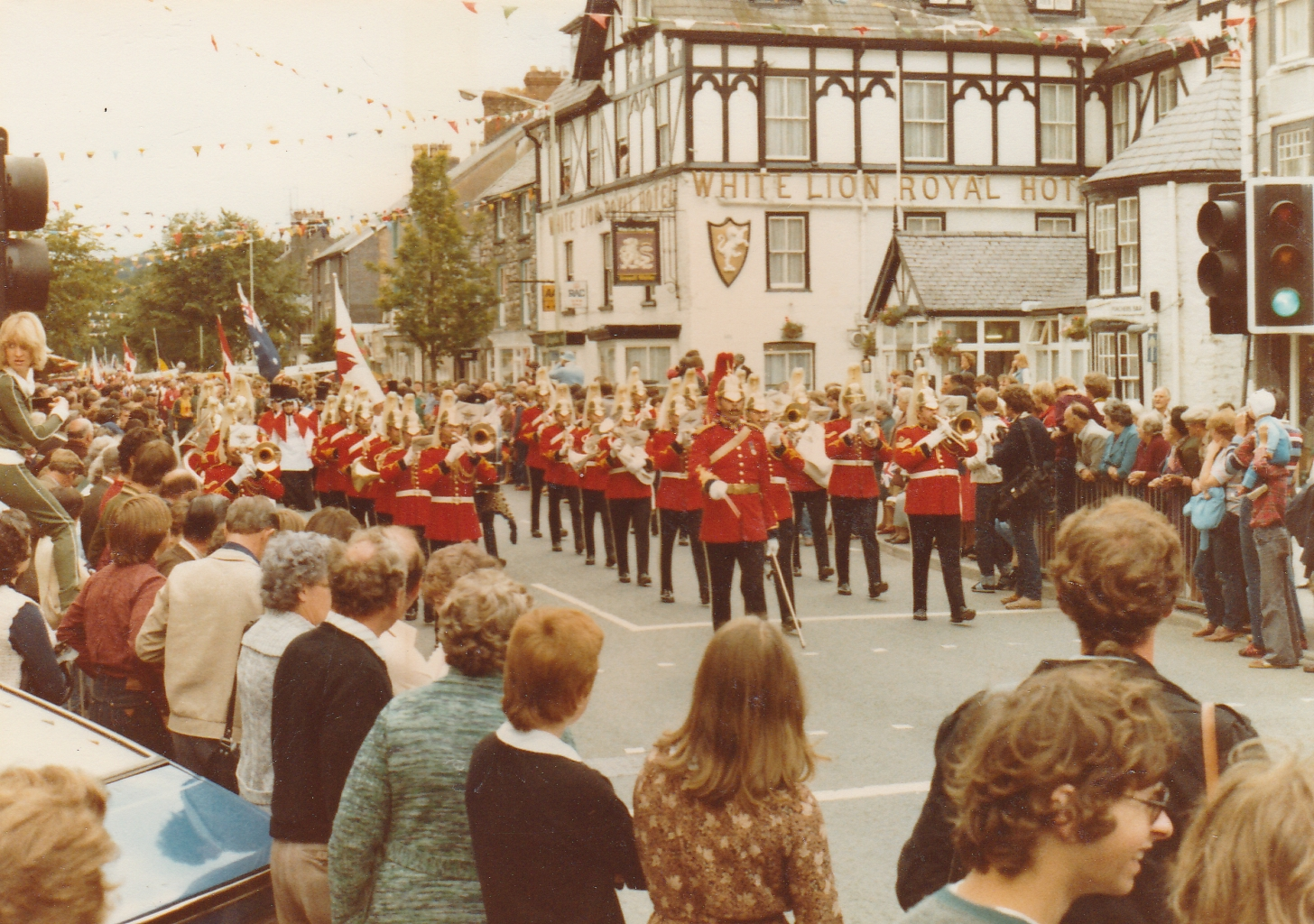
Opening ceremony

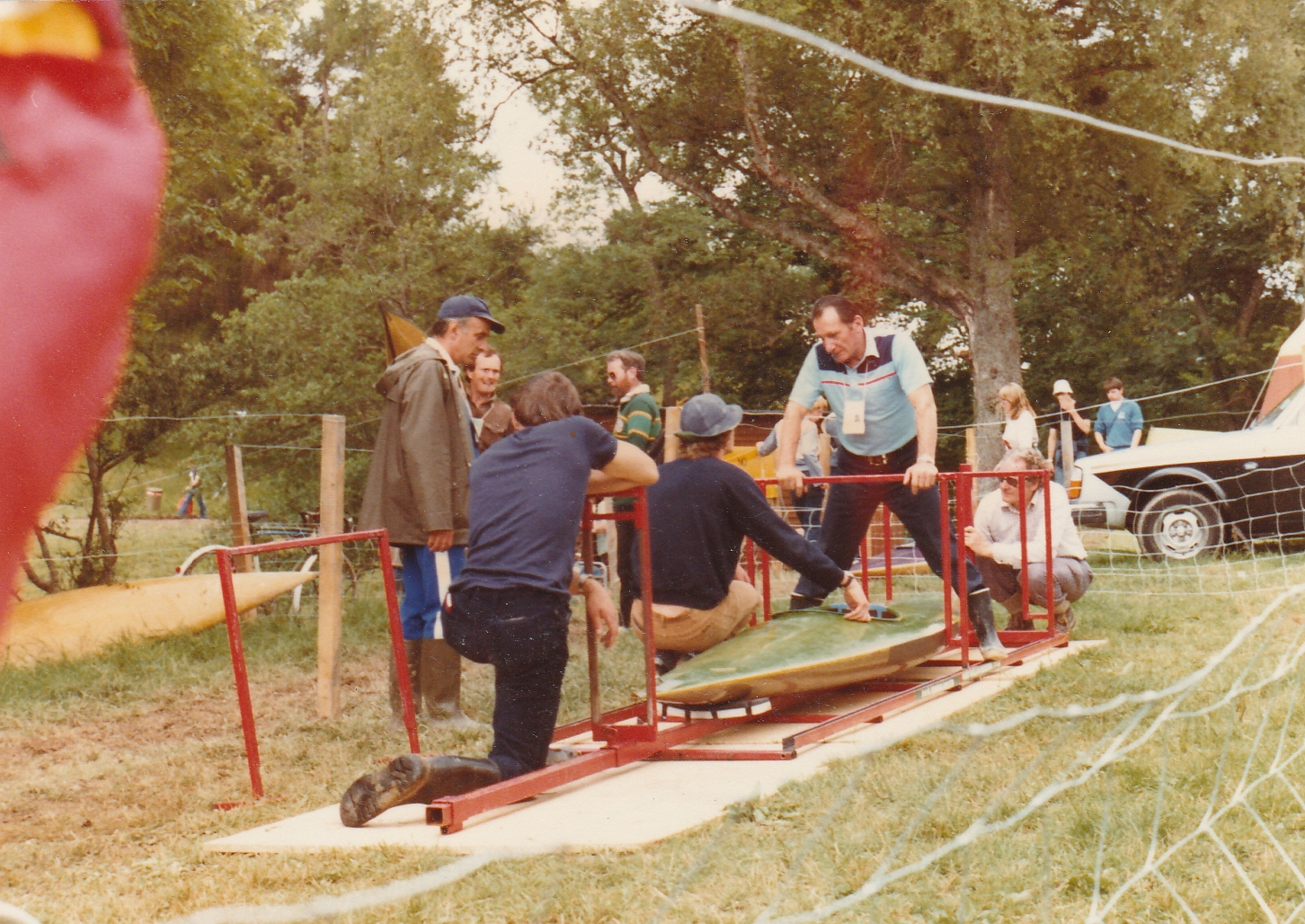
Competitors preparing

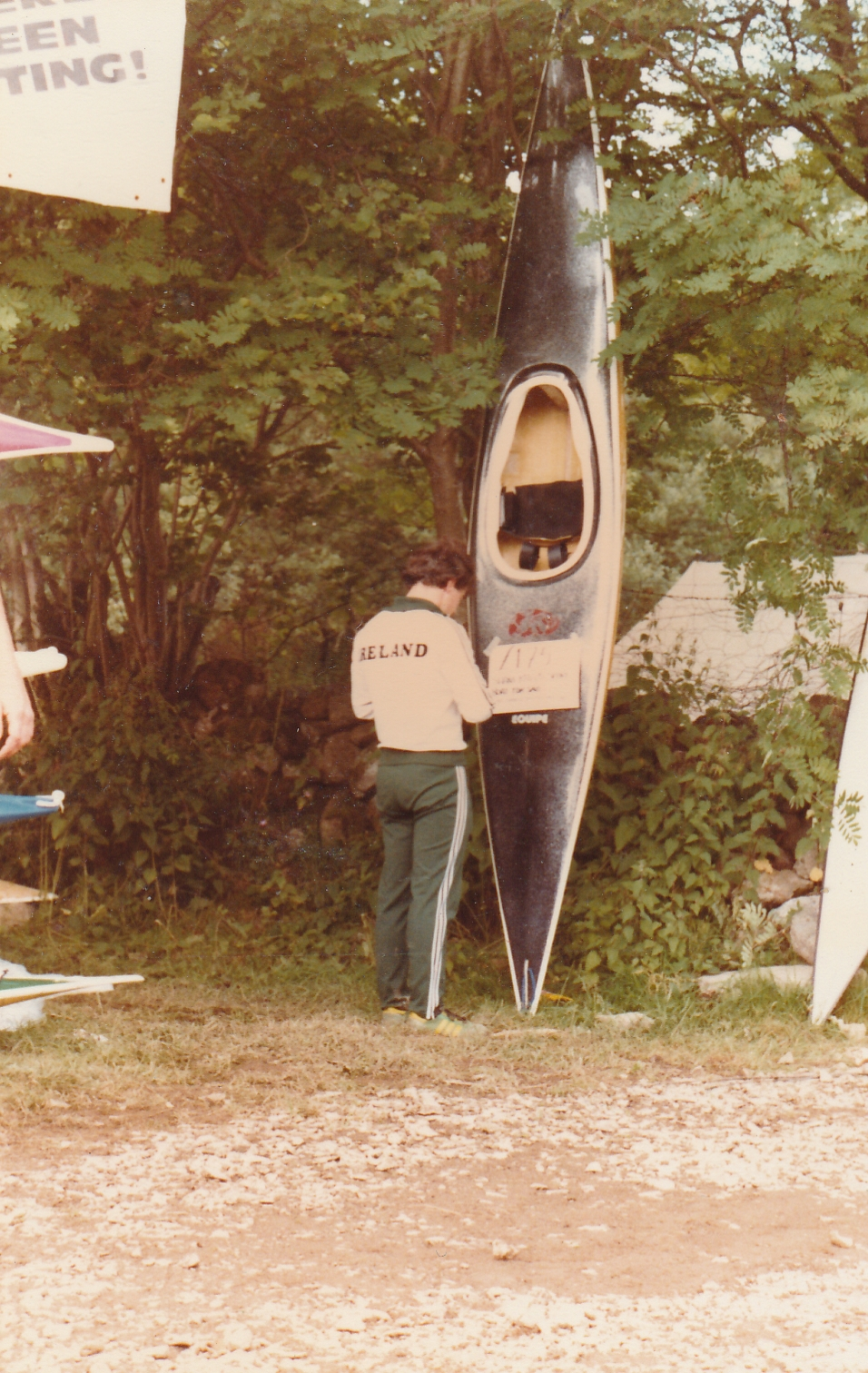
A member of the Irish team

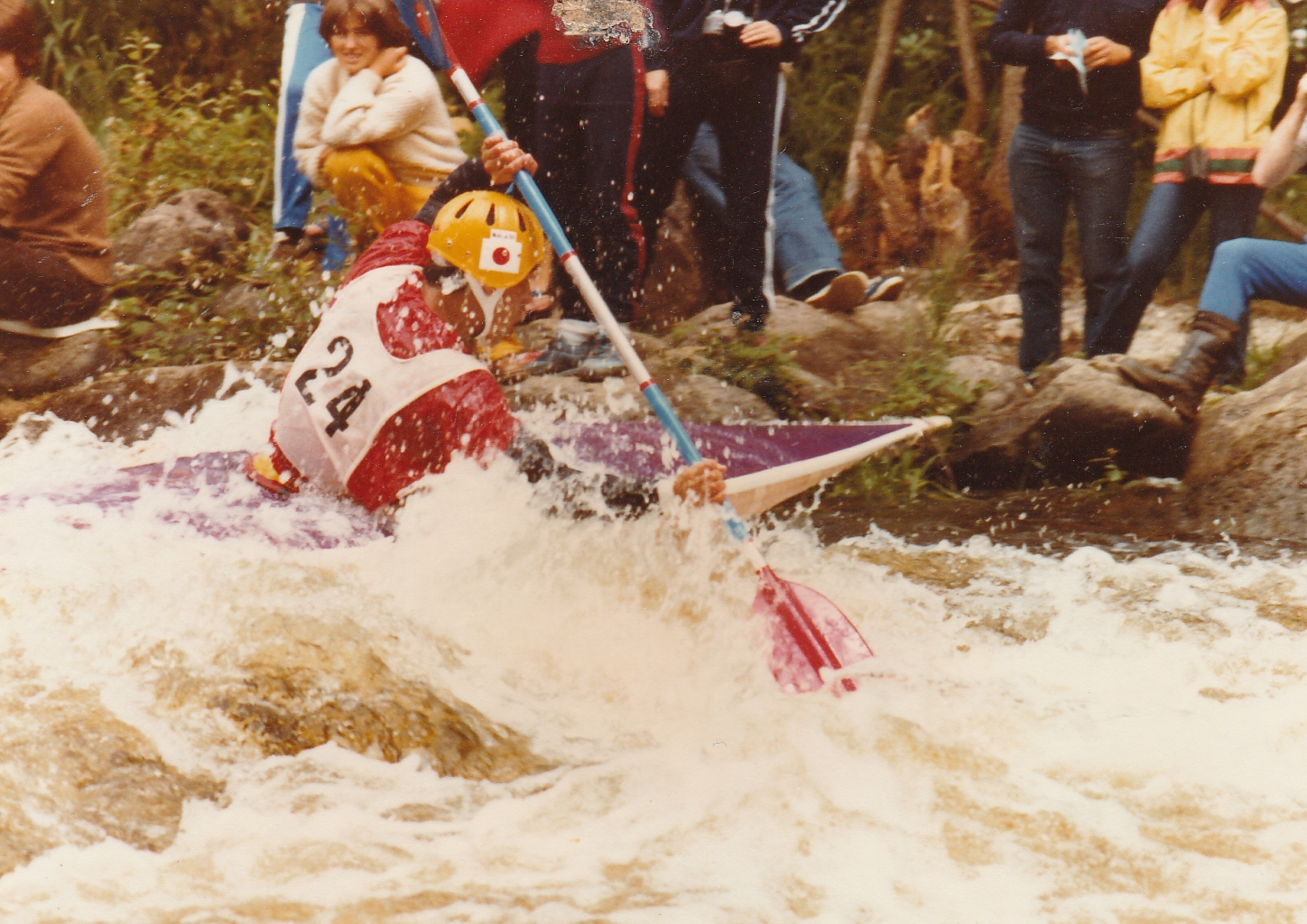
A competitor

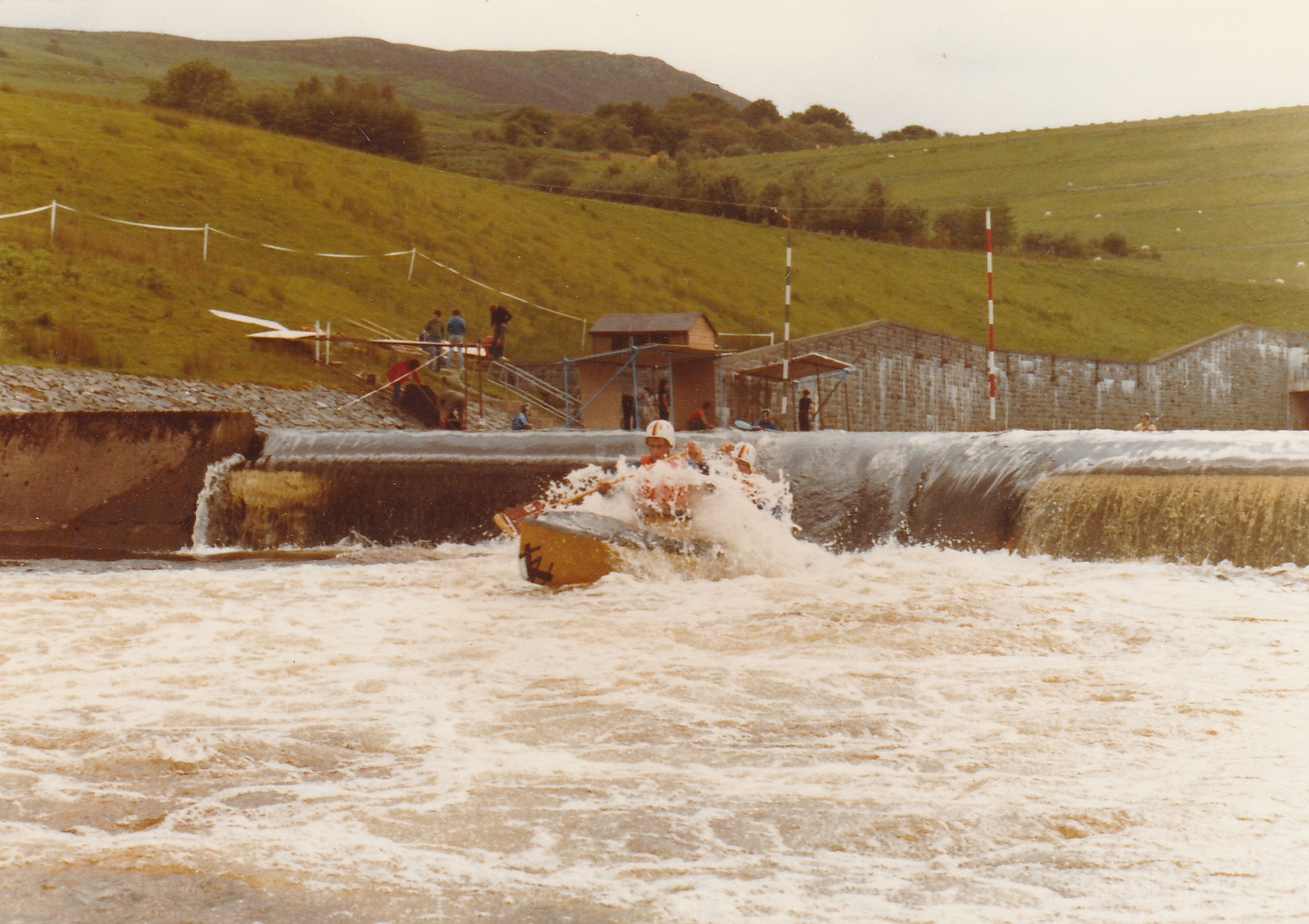
Competitors

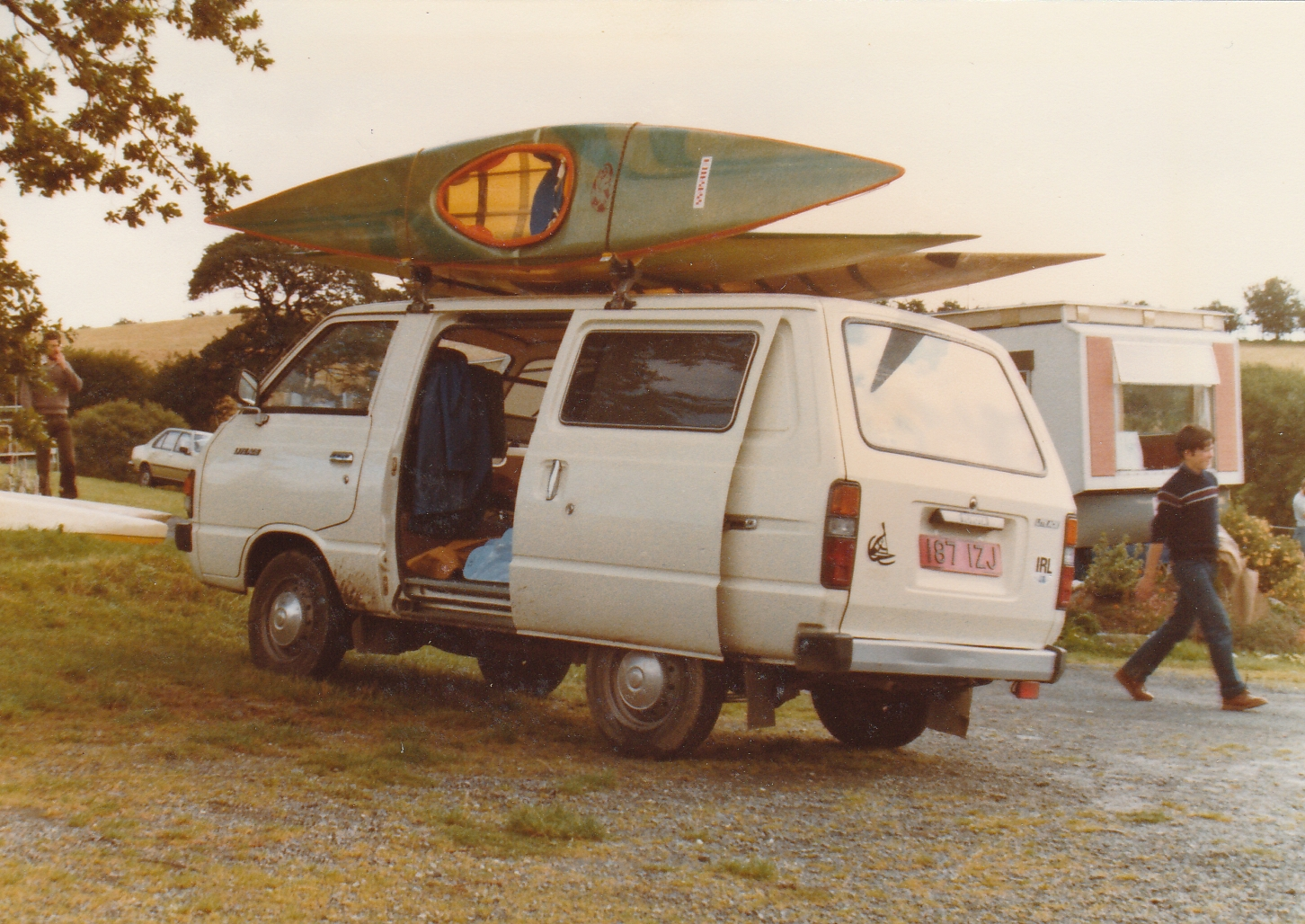
Transport

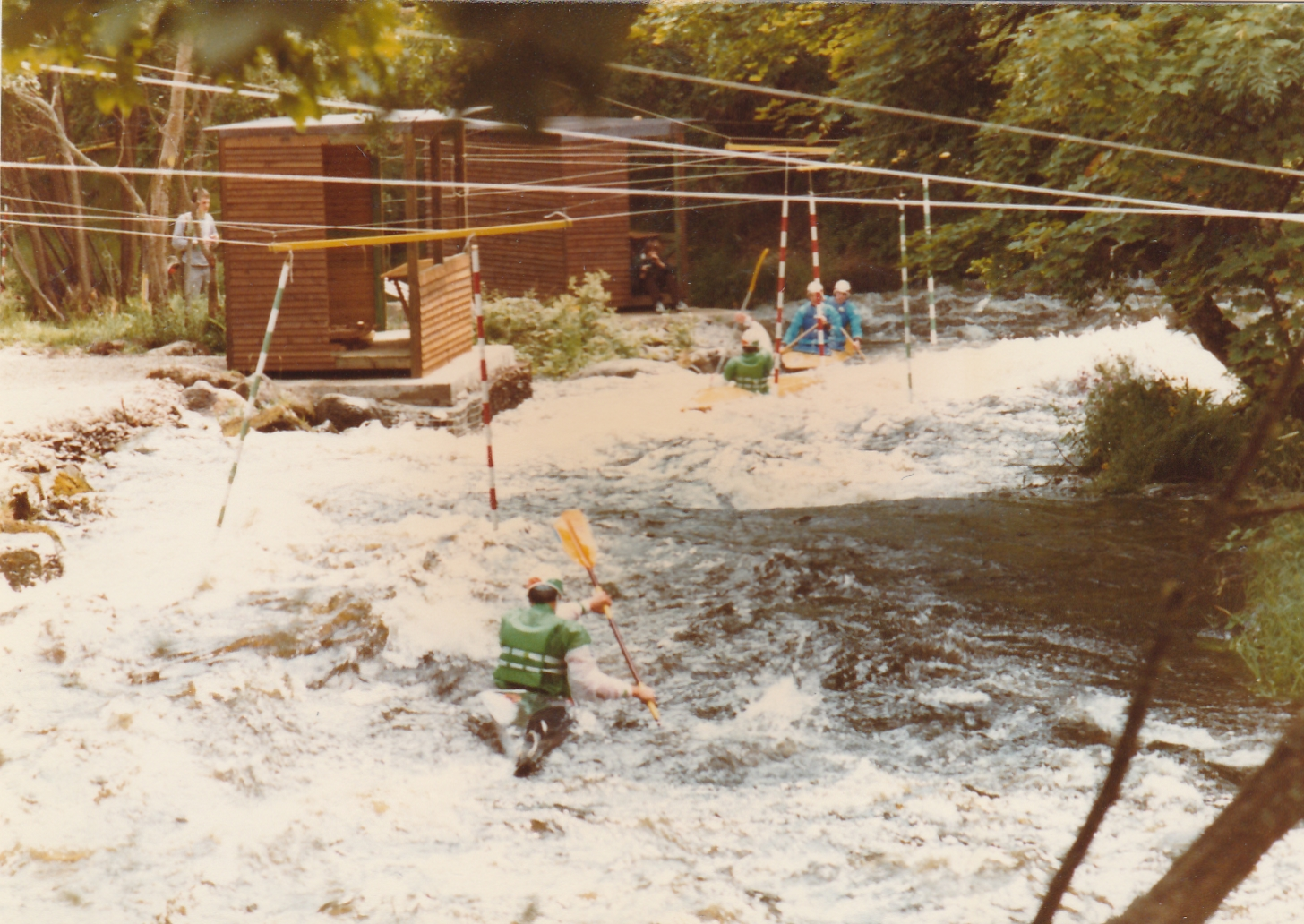
Competitors
