= Frank Becker (canoeist) =

West German slalom canoeist

Medal record

Men's canoe slalom

Representing West Germany

World Championships
Bronze medal – third place	1989 Savage River	C-2 team

Frank Becker is a former West German slalom canoeist who competed in the 1980s and the 1990s. He won a bronze medal in the C-2 team event at the 1989 ICF Canoe Slalom World Championships in Savage River.
