= Jock Young (canoeist) =

British slalom canoeist

Medal record

Men's canoe slalom

Representing Great Britain

World Championships
Gold medal – first place	1981 Bala	C-2 team

Jock Young is a former British slalom canoeist who competed in the 1980s.

He won a gold medal in the C-2 team event at the 1981 ICF Canoe Slalom World Championships in Bala.
