= Jean Engler (canoeist) =

Swiss canoeist

Medal record

Men's canoe slalom

Representing Switzerland

World Championships
Gold medal – first place	1949 Geneva	Folding K-1 team
Gold medal – first place	1953 Meran	C-2
Silver medal – second place	1953 Meran	C-2 team
Bronze medal – third place	1951 Steyr	Folding K-1 team

Jean Engler is a Swiss retired slalom canoeist who competed in the 1940s and the 1950s. He won four medals at the ICF Canoe Slalom World Championships with two golds (C-2: 1953, Folding K-1 team: 1949), a silver (C-2 team: 1953) and a bronze (Folding K-1 team: 1951).
