= Miloslav Duffek =

Sport
- Sport: Kayaking
- Event: Folding kayak
Medal record
Men's slalom canoeing
Representing Switzerland
World Championships
Silver medal – second place	1955 Tacen	Folding K-1

Miloslav Duffek (1928 – 25 February 2023 in Geneva) was a former Czechoslovak-Swiss slalom canoeist who competed from the early 1950s to the mid-1960s. He won a silver medal in the folding K-1 event at the 1955 ICF Canoe Slalom World Championships in Tacen.

Duffek popularized the bow draw stroke, a.k.a. "Duffek Stroke", as an effective means of pivoting a kayak. Before the bow stroke was popularized, only forward and reverse sweep strokes were generally used to turn a kayak. The Duffek Stroke turned a multi-stroke operation into a single stroke, which could then be combined with a forward stroke to continue momentum.
