= Eduard Radelspöck =

Austrian canoeist

Sport
- Sport: Kayaking
- Event: Folding kayak
Medal record
Men's canoe slalom
Representing Austria
World Championships
| Silver medal – second place | 1955 Tacen | Folding K-1 team |

Eduard Radelspöck is an Austrian retired slalom canoeist who competed in the mid-1950s. He won a silver medal in the folding K-1 team event at the 1955 ICF Canoe Slalom World Championships in Tacen.
