= 1953 ICF Canoe Slalom World Championships =

Canoe slalom event in Meran, Italy

The 1953 ICF Canoe Slalom World Championships were held in Meran, Italy under the auspices of International Canoe Federation. It was the 3rd edition.

== Medal summary ==
=== Men's ===
==== Canoe ====
Event	Gold	Points	Silver	Points	Bronze	Points
C1	Charles Dussuet (SUI)	384.4	Václav Nič (TCH)	422.0	Vladimír Jirásek (TCH)	449.2
C1 team	Czechoslovakia; Vladimír Jirásek; Jan Šulc; Stanislav Jánský	1321.8	Switzerland; Jean-Paul Rössinger; Roland Bardet; Charles Dussuet	1670.0	France; Jacques Marsigny; Jacques Velard; Pierre Biehler	1713.2
C2	Switzerland; Charles Dussuet; Jean Engler	354.6	Czechoslovakia; Václav Nič; Jan Šulc	363.6	France; Pierre d'Alençon; Jean-Luc Houssaye	384.7
C2 team	France; René Gavinet & Simon Gavinet; Claude Neveu & Roger Paris; Pierre d'Alençon & Jean-Luc Houssaye	1440.0	Switzerland; Jean-Paul Rössinger & R. Junod; Pierre Rössinger & Pierre Dufour; Charles Dussuet & Jean Engler	1466.4	Czechoslovakia; Josef Hendrych & Jiří Hradil; Václav Havel & Jiří Pecka; Miroslav Čihák & Jan Pecka	1537.6

==== Kayak ====
Event	Gold	Points	Silver	Points	Bronze	Points
Folding K1	Walter Kirschbaum (FRG)	330.1	Rudolf Sausgruber (AUT)	333.3	Milan Zadel (YUG)	333.5
Folding K1 team	Austria; Franz Grafetsberger; Hans Herbist; Rudolf Sausgruber	1020.6	East Germany; Dieter Frank; Helmuth Setzkorn; Hilmar Pawliczek	1059.4	West Germany; Karl Bruns; Karl Rath; Günter Deuble	1112.6

=== Women's ===
==== Kayak ====
Event	Gold	Points	Silver	Points	Bronze	Points
Folding K1	Fritzi Schwingl (AUT)	326.8	Eva Setzkorn (GDR)	339.9	Dana Martanová (TCH)	383.5
Folding K1 team	Czechoslovakia; Jaroslava Havlová; Dana Martanová; Květa Havlová	1222.2	East Germany; Anneliese Borwitz; Eveline Pawliczek; Eva Setzkorn	1255.1	Austria; Ulrike Werner; Gertrude Will; Fritzi Schwingl	1395.0

== Medals table ==
Rank	Nation	Gold	Silver	Bronze	Total
1	Czechoslovakia (TCH)	2	2	3	7
2	Switzerland (SUI)	2	2	0	4
3	Austria (AUT)	2	1	1	4
4	France (FRA)	1	0	2	3
5	West Germany (FRG)	1	0	1	2
6	East Germany (GDR)	0	3	0	3
7	Yugoslavia (YUG)	0	0	1	1
Totals (7 entries)		8	8	8	24
