= Werner Vogler =

West German slalom canoeist

Sport
- Sport: Kayaking
- Event: Folding kayak
Medal record
Men's canoe slalom
Representing West Germany
World Championships
Bronze medal – third place	1959 Geneva	Folding K-1 team

Werner Vogler is a retired West German slalom canoeist who competed in the late 1950s. He won a bronze medal in the folding K-1 team event at the 1959 ICF Canoe Slalom World Championships in Geneva.
