= Sigi Holzbauer =

German canoeist

Sport
- Sport: Kayaking
- Event: Folding kayak
Medal record
Men's slalom canoeing
Representing West Germany
World Championships
Gold medal – first place	1955 Tacen	Folding K-1
Gold medal – first place	1955 Tacen	Folding K-1 team

Sigi Holzbauer is a retired West German slalom canoeist who competed in the mid-1950s. He won two gold medals at the 1955 ICF Canoe Slalom World Championships in Tacen, earning them in the folding K-1 event and the folding K-1 team event.
