= Vladimír Cibák =

Czechoslovak slalom canoeist

Medal record

Men's canoe slalom

Representing Czechoslovakia

World Championships
Silver medal – second place	1957 Augsburg	Folding K1 team
Silver medal – second place	1959 Geneva	Folding K1 team
Bronze medal – third place	1955 Tacen	Folding K1 team

Vladimír Cibák was a Czechoslovak slalom canoeist of Slovak nationality who competed in the mid-to-late 1950s.

Cibák participated in three World Championships, winning three medals in the folding K1 team event with two silvers (1957, 1959) and one bronze (1955).

He died on 16 August 2015 after a lengthy illness at the age of 81.

== Major championships results timeline ==
Event		1955	1956	1957	1958	1959
World Championships	Folding K1	8	Not held	21	Not held	5
World Championships	Folding K1 team	3	Not held	2	Not held	2
