= Bernard Renault (canoeist) =

French canoeist

Medal record

Men's canoe slalom

Representing France

World Championships
Gold medal – first place	1977 Spittal	K-1 team
Bronze medal – third place	1981 Bala	K-1 team

Bernard Renault is a French former slalom canoeist who competed from the mid-1970s to the mid-1980s.

He won two medals in the K-1 team event at the ICF Canoe Slalom World Championships with a gold in 1977 and a bronze in 1981.
