= Herbert Beck (canoeist) =

West German slalom canoeist

Medal record

Men's canoe slalom

Representing West Germany

World Championships
Silver medal – second place	1967 Lipno	K1 team

Herbert Beck is a former West German slalom canoeist who competed in the 1960s. He won a silver medal in the K1 team event at the 1967 ICF Canoe Slalom World Championships in Lipno.
