= Władysław Piecyk =

Polish canoeist

Sport
- Sport: Kayaking
- Event: Folding kayak
Medal record
Men's canoe slalom
Representing Poland
World Championships
Silver medal – second place	1963 Spittal	Folding K-1 team
Bronze medal – third place	1961 Hainsberg	Folding K-1 team

Władysław Piecyk is a Polish retired slalom canoeist who competed from the late 1950s to the mid-1960s. He won two medals in the folding K-1 team event at the ICF Canoe Slalom World Championships with a silver in 1963 and a bronze in 1961.
