= Hans Frühwirth =

Sport
- Sport: Kayaking
- Event: Folding kayak
Medal record
Men's slalom canoeing
Representing Austria
World Championships
Gold medal – first place	1951 Steyr	Folding K-1
Gold medal – first place	1951 Steyr	Folding K-1 team
Silver medal – second place	1949 Geneva	Folding K-1
Silver medal – second place	1949 Geneva	Folding K-1 team

Hans Frühwirth is an Austrian retired slalom canoeist who competed in the late 1940s and the early 1950s. He won four medals at the ICF Canoe Slalom World Championships with a two golds (Folding K-1: 1951, Folding K-1 team: 1951) and two silvers (Folding K-1: 1949, Folding K-1 team: 1949).
