= Vižmarje =

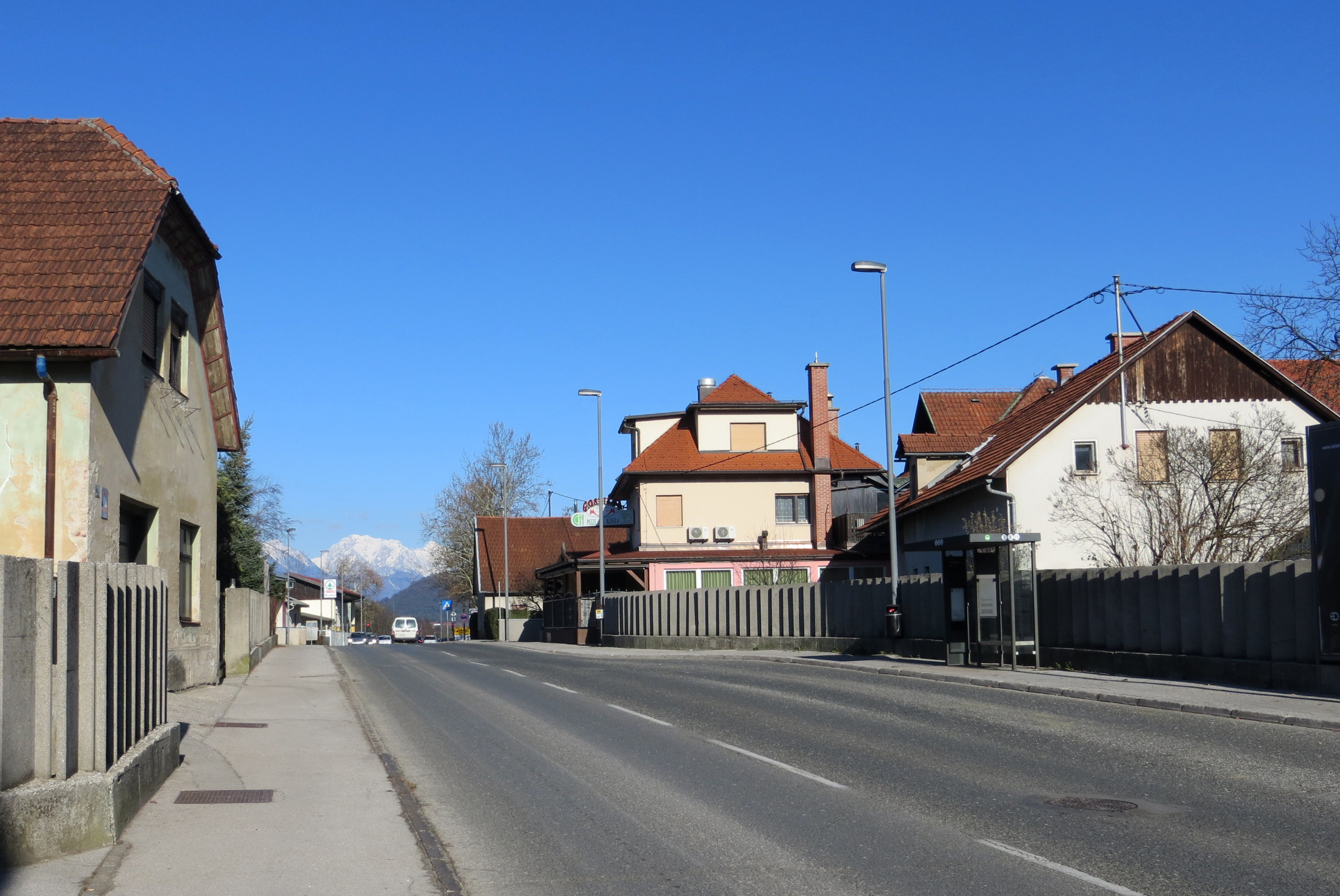

- Location in Slovenia
- Coordinates: 46°6′43.78″N 14°27′36.61″E
- Country: Slovenia
- Traditional region: Upper Carniola
- Statistical region: Central Slovenia
- Municipality: Ljubljana
- Elevation: 315 m (1,033 ft)

Vižmarje (pronounced [ˈʋiːʒmaɾjɛ], German: Wischmarje) is a formerly independent settlement in the northern part of the capital Ljubljana in central Slovenia. It is part of the traditional region of Upper Carniola and is now included with the rest of the municipality in the Central Slovenia Statistical Region. It is located in the northwestern part of the city and belongs to the Šentvid District.

Vižmarje is known for the fact that on 17 May 1869, the largest all-Slovene mass rally was organised there on Whit Monday, and around 30,000 participants from the nearby and distant Slovene lands of Austria-Hungary demanded a United Slovenia, Slovene as the official language, Slovene schools, and a faculty. The Vižmarje rally was the only one organised by the Slovene political leadership of the Carniola region. It was also the only all-Slovene rally, as all the Slovene lands were represented: Carniola, Styria, the Slovene Littoral, and Carinthia.

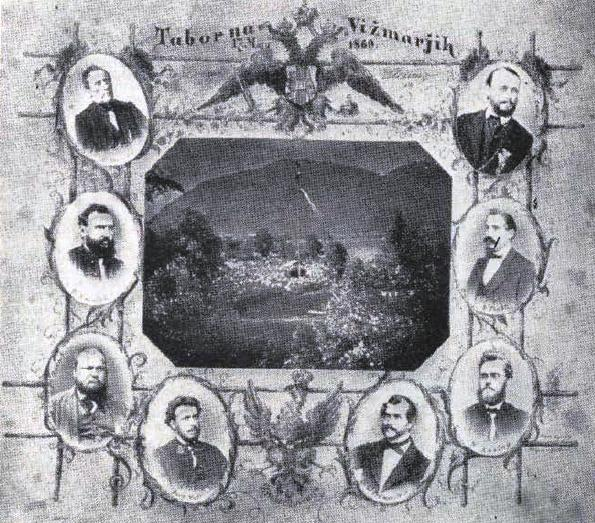
The Vižmarje mass rally, 17 May 1869

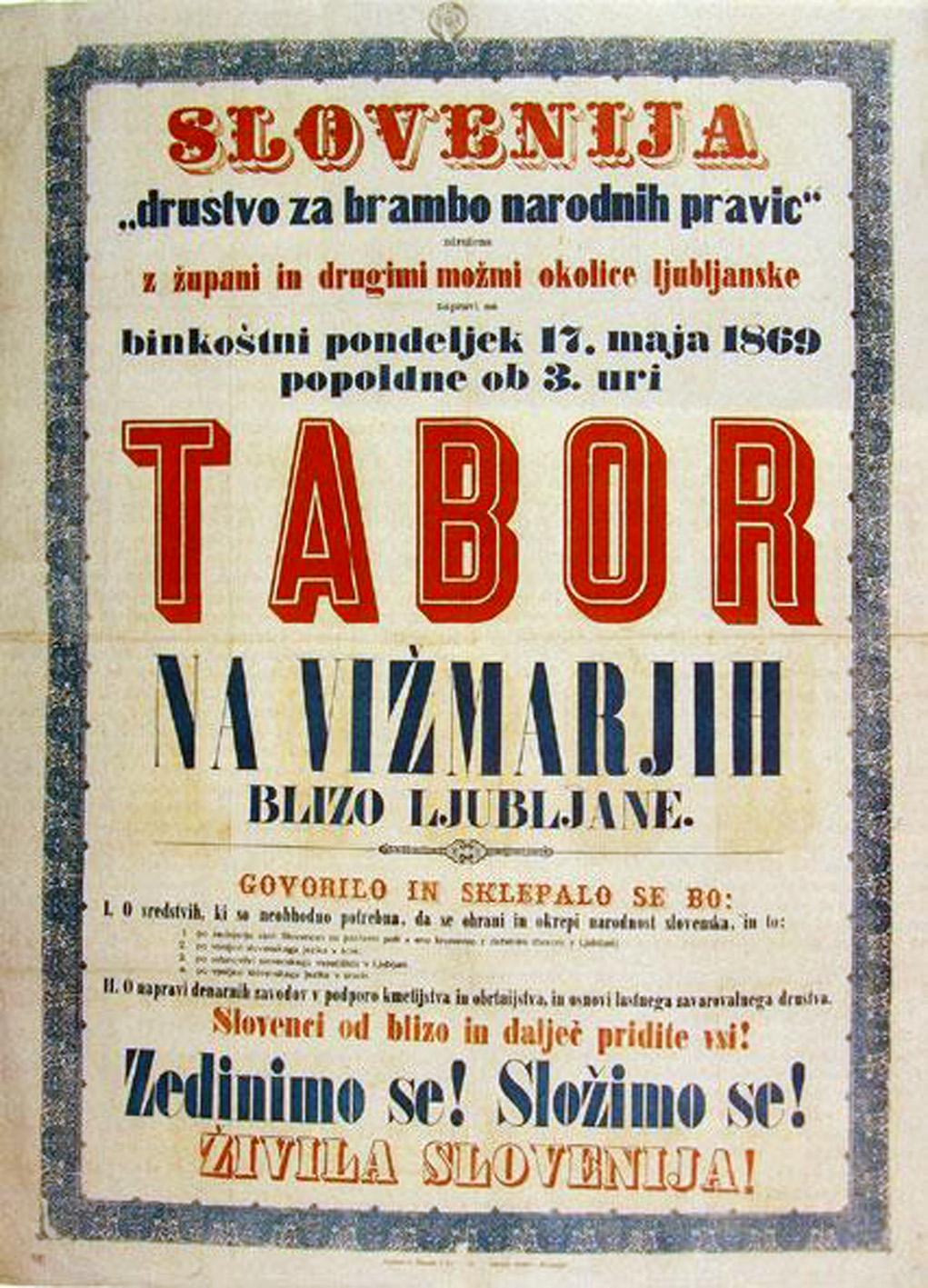
Poster announcing the all-Slovene mass rally in Vižmarje on 17 May 1869

== Geography ==
Vižmarje lies northwest of Šentvid, along both sides of the road towards Tacen. The northern part of Vižmarje from where the road descends is also called Velike Vižmarje, and the southern part is called Male Vižmarje. Historically, Vižmarje extended to the north all the way to the Sava River; however, as the settlement became more populated, the northern part between the power line and the river became known as Brod, which initially was only a designation for the few houses on the right bank of the Sava River. To the south, Vižmarje extends to Celovška cesta, and to the southeast to Šentvid, which starts approximately where A2 motorway was built. In Vižmarje, there are an elementary school and a railway station. Bus lines 8, 8B, 15, and 25 run through Vižmarje. There is also the bus terminus of city bus line 1.

== Name ==
Vižmarje was attested in written sources in 1283 as Geiselmannsdorf bei Laibach (and as Geyselmansdorf in 1331 and Geismanstorf in 1385, among other variations, as well as Vsmariach and Vsmarich in 1554, and Vismarie in 1763–87). The Slovene name originates from the fused prepositional phrase *v (J)ižmarje 'in Jižmarje', based on the personal name *Jižmar, which was borrowed (and palatalized) from the Middle High German name Gîs(al)mâr. In the more recent past, the German name Wischmarje was used.

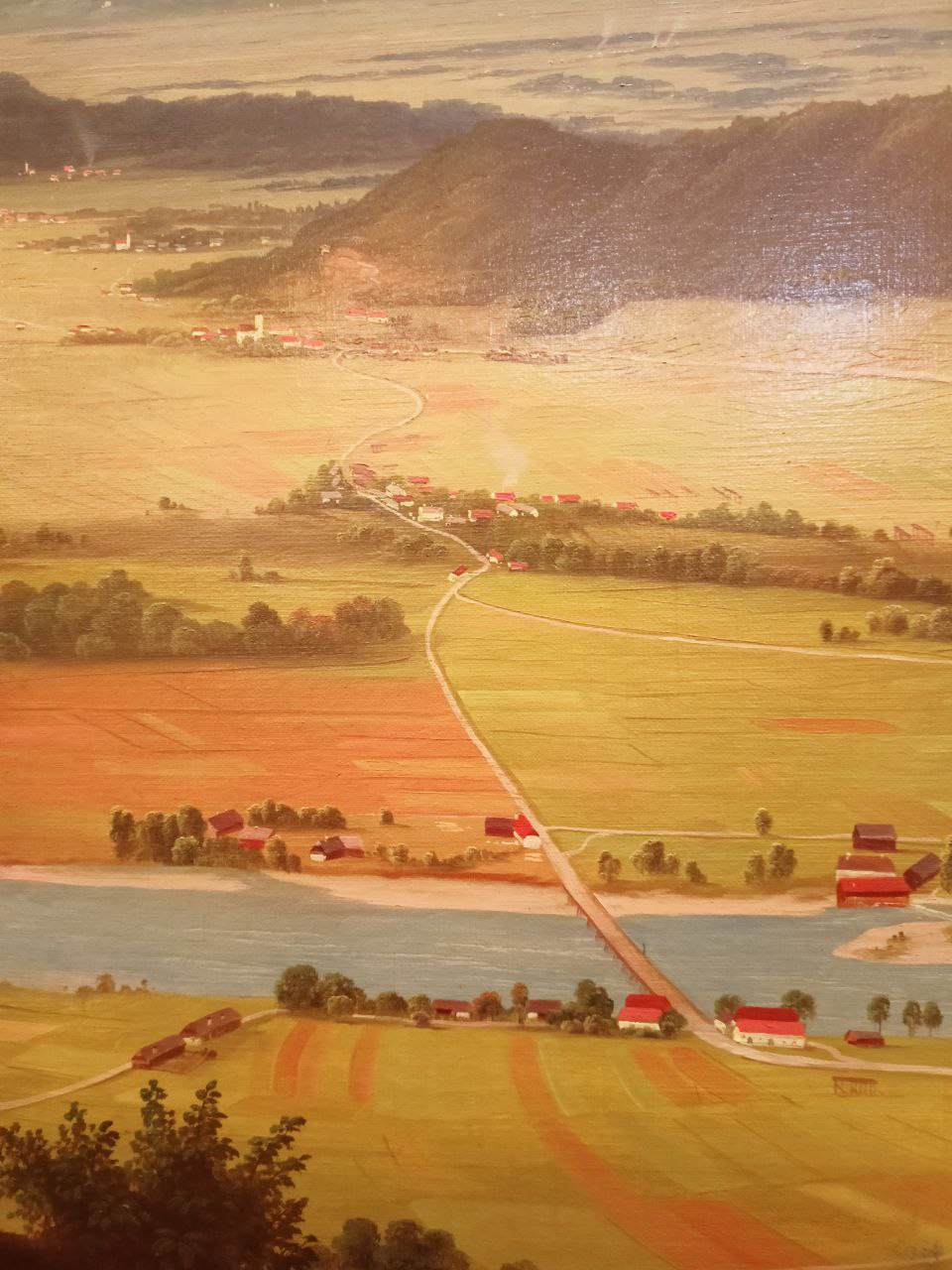
A view from Mount Saint Mary toward Vižmarje (1860–1869)

According to a false etymology related by the inhabitants of Vižmarje, the name of the settlement originates from the exclamation viš Marijo! 'see, Mary!'. When the inhabitants of the surrounding settlements took refuge on Mount Saint Mary during the Turkish invasions and they reached Male Vižmarje, they were able to see St. Mary's Church on the saddle of Mount Saint Mary.

== History ==
Vižmarje has long been known for its well-developed carpentry; there were at least five carpentry workshops. A factory for cotton fabric was established in 1928, the Skip metals company in 1949, a sports equipment factory in 1954, and the Iskra ceramics and automation plant in 1957. Vižmarje was annexed by the village of Šentvid in 1961, ending its existence as an independent settlement. Šentvid itself was annexed by the city of Ljubljana in 1974.

== Notable people ==
Notable people that were born or lived in Vižmarje include:

- Fran Erjavec (1893–1960), editor
- Andrej Jemec (born 1934), painter
- Manica Koman (1880–1961), writer
- Bogomir Pregelj (1906–1970), journalist and librarian
- Andrej Snoj (1886–1962), theology professor and Biblical scholar
- Ivan Štrukelj (1869–1948), writer
