= Nadan Vidošević =

Croatian politician, businessman and entrepreneur

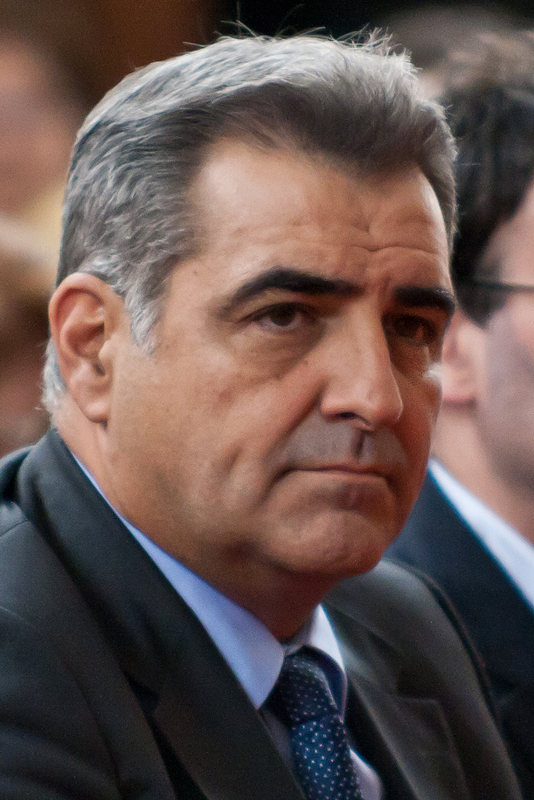

President of the Croatian Chamber of Economy
- In office 1995 – 15 November 2013
- Preceded by: Mladen Vedriš
- Succeeded by: Sabina Škrtić (Acting)

Minister of Economy
- In office 12 October 1993 – 18 September 1995
- Prime Minister: Nikica Valentić
- Preceded by: Ivan Čermak
- Succeeded by: Zlatko Mateša

President of Hajduk Split
- In office 1992–1996
- Preceded by: Stjepan Jukić Peladić
- Succeeded by: Anđelko Gabrić

Personal details
- Born: 30 January 1960 (age 66) Split, PR Croatia, FPR Yugoslavia
- Party: Croatian Democratic Union (until 2009); Independent (2009–present)
- Height: 6 ft 3.5 in (192 cm)
- Spouse: Ina Vidošević
- Education: University of Split

Nadan Vidošević (born 30 January 1960) is a Croatian politician, businessman, and entrepreneur. On 12 November 2013, he was arrested on the charge of misappropriating 32.9 million kunas (US$5.8 million at the time) from the Croatian Chamber of Economy. He was a long-time member of the Croatian Democratic Union, before launching an independent and ultimately unsuccessful candidacy for the 2009–10 Croatian presidential election.

== Overview ==
Vidošević graduated from the Split Faculty of Economy in 1984. He started his career at Dalmacijacement, a company producing construction materials, and rose to become the company's CEO in 1990.

In 1992, he became president of the Croatian football club Hajduk Split, a position he held for nearly four years. During that time, Hajduk managed to win two league titles, one cup title, and reached the UEFA Champions League quarter-finals in 1995, which was Hajduk's greatest achievement in modern-day Croatia. However, during that same time, Ivan Buljan, Vedran Rožić, and Vidošević were charged with tax evasion, allegedly damaging club's finances by a total of 55 million kunas (US$8.8 million at the time).

Following the 1993 Chamber of Counties election, he was elected to the now defunct Chamber of Counties of the Croatian Parliament on the Croatian Democratic Union ticket, as a representative of the Split-Dalmatia County. In October of the same year, he was appointed Minister of Economy under prime minister Nikica Valentić, a position he held until 1995.

In 1995, he was elected chairman of the Croatian Chamber of Economy, a position he held until 2013, after having been re-elected four times - in 1999, 2003, 2007, and 2011.

Vidošević won 11.3 percent of the vote in the first round of the 2009 presidential election and was eliminated.

Vidošević was arrested on 12 November 2013, on the charge of misappropriating 32.9 million kunas (US$5.8 million at the time) from the Croatian Chamber of Economy. In December 2021, he was sentenced to eight years in prison and ordered to repay the misappropriated funds, a total of 35.5 million kunas (U$5.3 million at the time). As of August 2025, he is still imprisoned at the Remetinec prison.

Civic offices
Preceded by Mladen Vedriš	President of Croatian Chamber of Economy; 1995–2013	Succeeded by Sabina Škrtić (Acting)
Political offices
Preceded by Ivan Čermak	Minister of Economy; 1993–1995	Succeeded by Zlatko Mateša
Preceded by Position Created	Prefect of Split-Dalmatia County; 1993–1994	Succeeded by Kruno Peronja
Sporting positions
Preceded by Đuro Brodarac	President of the Croatian Football Federation; 1996	Succeeded by Josip Šoić
Preceded by Stjepan Jukić-Peladić	President of Hajduk Split; 1992–1996	Succeeded by Anđelko Gabrić
