= Marin Brbić =

Croatian businessman and economist (born 1961)

President of Hajduk Split
- In office 6 March 2019 – 13 July 2020
- Preceded by: Jasmin Huljaj
- Succeeded by: Lukša Jakobušić
- In office 4 July 2012 – 1 April 2016
- Preceded by: Hrvoje Maleš
- Succeeded by: Marijana Bošnjak (acting); Ivan Kos

Personal details
- Born: 24 August 1961 (age 65) Makarska, PR Croatia, FPR Yugoslavia
- Education: University of Sarajevo
- Occupation: Businessman; economist
- Profession: Economist

Marin Brbić (born 24 August 1961) is a Croatian businessman and economist who served as chairman of the Croatian football club Hajduk Split from 2012 to 2016, and then again from 2019 to 2020.

== Career ==
Brbić started his career in tourism. He was the hotel director and the board member of the hotel company "Bluesun" with its headquarters in Zagreb. In June 2012, he became the chairman of Hajduk Split.

Brbić became president at a time when the club suffered an economic crisis and owned more than 15 million euros of debt. Brbić managed to get a loan from the banks for an amount of almost 4 million euros with the City of Split as bondsman for the loan. He managed to sell the club's most worthy players and lowered the wages drastically. During his time, Anton Maglica was the only player in which Hajduk paid money for a transfer deal in July 2012. Until 2016, Hajduk only got players who were free of contract. Brbić managed to close the economic gap and in recent years Hajduk started doing financially positive. In 2016, it was revealed that Hajduk was no longer in a financial crisis but a small debt to the City of Split still exists.

As Hajduk was in a very hard financial situation, good sport results were not expected at that time. During his presidency that lasted 4 years, club changed 4 managers and 3 sports directors. During that time, Hajduk won 1 trophy (2012–13 national cup), finished twice as third and once as fourth in the national league championship and achieved twice to enter into the play-off round of the UEFA Europa League in 2014 and 2015.

During the 4-year period he served as president, a number of players such as Ante Vukušić, Josip Radošević, Mario Pašalić, Antonio Milić, Dino Mikanović, Andrija Balić, Mijo Caktaš and Jean Kouassi were successfully sold for a large amount of money in order to solve financial situation. Marketing activities and income significantly increased and a lot of new sponsorships were gained.

Brbić was advocator for removing irregularities in Croatian football. On June 4, 2014, at a parking lot in Dugopolje, Brbić was attacked by Alojzije Šupraha, the referee chairman of the Split-Dalmatia County. The incident happened after Brbić attended a Hajduk Split youth match where they won a trophy. Brbić suffered a punch to the head and medical assistance was needed. The incident went to court and Šupraha was convicted. He was sentenced to 7 days in prison and a 6-month probation. In November 2014, under Brbić's governance Hajduk refused to play a derby against Dinamo in Zagreb due to the irregularities in Croatian football. As a consequence, there was a large protest against Croatian Football Federation in Split supported with more than 30,000 people on November 29, 2014. The result was modification of the Sports law by Croatian parliament in 2015.

In June 2015, Brbić was elected for the next three years as the president. On April 1, 2016, the supervisory board of Hajduk voted 5-to-4 for the resignation of Brbić after a series of bad results on the football pitch but the true reasons were never completely explained.

During the 2017 Croatian local elections, he ran as an independent candidate for the city council of Tučepi. He finished third with 21,20 per cent of the vote which was enough to secure him a place in the council.

On March 6, 2019, Brbić was announced as the new president of Hajduk Split for the second time. Before the start of the season, he made a promise that if Hajduk does not secure second place at the end of the season, he is ready to leave the position of the club president. On July 13, 2020, Brbić held his promise and self willingly resigned from the position.

Preceded by Hrvoje Maleš	President of Hajduk Split; July 2012 – April 2016	Succeeded by Marijana Bošnjak (interim)
Preceded by Jasmin Huljaj	President of Hajduk Split; March 2019 – Jul 2020	Succeeded by Lukša Jakobušić
