= Šmartno pod Šmarno Goro =

- Location in Slovenia
- Coordinates: 46°7′28″N 14°28′36″E
- Country: Slovenia
- Traditional region: Upper Carniola
- Statistical region: Central Slovenia
- Municipality: Ljubljana
- Elevation: 314 m (1,030 ft)

Šmartno pod Šmarno Goro (pronounced [ˈʃmaːɾtnɔ pɔt ˈʃmaːɾnɔ ˈɡɔːɾɔ]; German: Sankt Martin unter dem Großkahlenberge) is a formerly independent settlement in the northern part of the capital Ljubljana in central Slovenia. It is part of the traditional region of Upper Carniola and is now included with the rest of the municipality in the Central Slovenia Statistical Region.

== Geography ==
Šmartno pod Šmarno Goro is a clustered village at the southeast foot of Mount Saint Mary along the road from Tacen to Vodice. It includes the hamlets of Pšatnik, Roje, Solzna Dolina, Kudrovec, and Blatna Vas. The soil is a mixture of sand and loam. The village's fields lie to the north, towards Vodice.

== Name ==
Šmartno pod Šmarno Goro literally means 'Šmartno below Mount Saint Mary'. It is named after Saint Martin, the patron saint of the local church. It was attested in 1296 as Sanctus Martinus sub Monte Sancte Marie (and as Sand Marten in 1420, and Sand Martten pey der Saw in 1430). The name Šmartno is a result of contraction (*šent Martìn 'Saint Martin' > *Šm̥martìn > *Šmártən) and the masculine form then underwent hypercorrection to a neuter noun.

== History ==
A Sunday school was established in Šmartno pod Šmarno Goro in 1824 and met in a private house. A schoolhouse was built in 1866. It was greatly damaged in the 1895 Ljubljana earthquake and replaced by a new building in 1898 (with war damage repaired in 1946). Šmartno pod Šmarno Goro was annexed by the City of Ljubljana in 1983, ending its existence as an independent settlement.

== Church ==
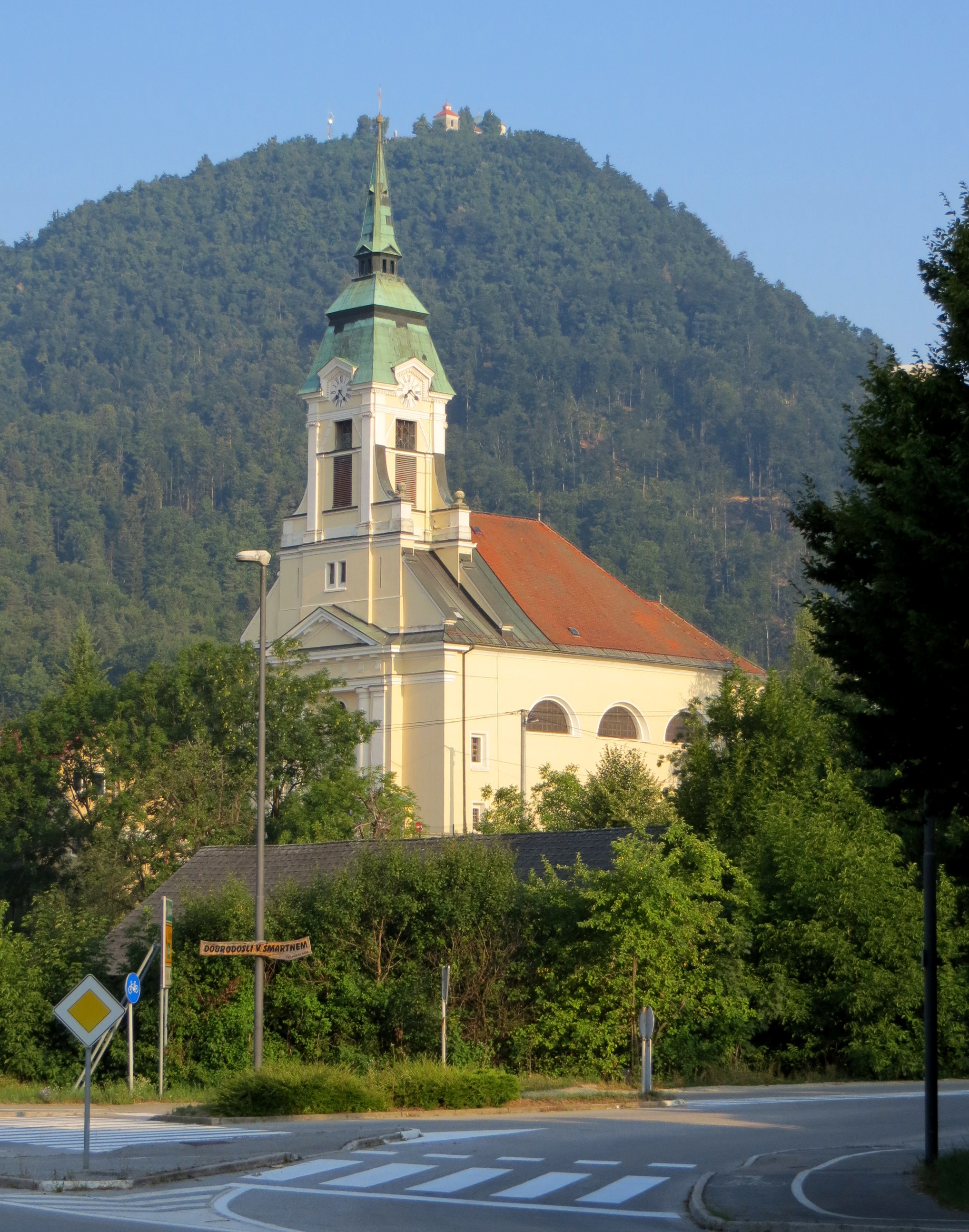
Saint Martin's Church below Mount Saint Mary

The church in Šmartno pod Šmarno Goro is dedicated to Saint Martin. It was mentioned in 1296 as the seat of an independent parish. The current structure was created in 1842 by the master builder Matej Medved (1796–1865) according to plans by the engineer Simon Foyker from Ljubljana. The church contains paintings by Matija Bradaška (1852–1915) and Janez Šubic. The chancel was painted by Matej Langus (1792–1855), and the altars are the work of Andrej Rovšek Sr. (1836–1903).

== Notable people ==
Notable people that were born or lived in Šmartno pod Šmarno Goro include:

- Franc Bukovec (1910–1942), Partisan and People's Hero of Yugoslavia
- Fran Jeriša (1829–1855), poet
- Franc Lavtižar (1874–1930), schoolmaster and orchard specialist
- Franc Šuštar (born 1923), mycologist and botanist
