= Robert Inhelder =

Medal record

Men's canoe slalom

Representing Switzerland

World Championships
Bronze medal – third place	1955 Tacen	C-1 team

Robert Inhelder is a Swiss retired slalom canoeist who competed in the mid-1950s. He won a bronze medal in the C-1 team event at the 1955 ICF Canoe Slalom World Championships in Tacen.
