= Grmada =

Grmada (Slovene for "stake") can be:

- Grmada, the west peak of Mount Saint Mary (Šmarna gora), a mountain in Ljubljana, the capital of Slovenia
- Grmada above Krško, a hill near the city of Krško, southeastern Slovenia
- Grmada above Ortnek, a hill in the Municipality of Ribnica, southern Slovenia
- Polhov Gradec Grmada, a hill near the settlement of Polhov Gradec, central Slovenia
- Grmada, Trebnje, a village in the Municipality of Trebnje, southeastern Slovenia
