= Manica Koman =

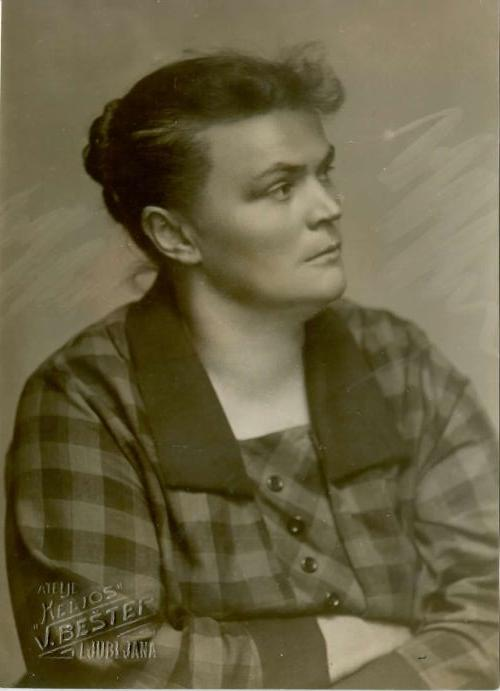
- Born: 4 August 1880; Vižmarje
- Died: 4 February 1961 (aged 80)
- Occupation: Author
- Writing career
- Genres: Poetry; Fairy tales
- Notable work: Narodne pravljice in legende

Manica Koman (4 August 1880 — 4 February 1961) was a Slovene poet and author of fairy tales. She was a symbol of women's independence and liberation during the interwar period, before Slovenian women received equal rights.

== Early life ==
Koman was born on 4 August 1880 in Vižmarje to a poor family. She attended a primary school in Šentvid, after which she returned to her parents' farm to work. Despite her lack of formal education, Koman cultivated a love of literature. She practiced her writing in secret.

Manica Koman (center) with her brother and niece in the 1950s

Koman lived with her parents until 1911, when she got a job working for the newspaper Slovenski narod. She worked there until 1916, when she became a clerk for Ljubljana Town Hall.

== Career ==
Koman started her literary career by publishing short stories and poems in newspapers like Slovenska gospodinja, Slovenski narod, Domovina, Slovenski dom, Gruda, Kmetijski list, Slovenski branik, and Ženski svet. In 1918, Koman published an autobiography of her childhood, Šopek samotarke (Bouquet of Anchoress's Flowers).

Koman was notable for rewriting traditional Slovenian folklore and legends into fairy tales. Her underdog story struck a chord for Slovenian women, who saw her as a symbol of liberation and women's emancipation. Koman is considered one of Slovenia's best interwar period literary authors.

== Selected works ==
- Šopek samotarke (Bouquet of Anchoress’s Flowers), 1918
- Narodne pravljice in legende (Folk Fairy Tales and Legends), 1923
- Slovenska žena (Slovenian Wife), 1926
- Teta s cekarjem. Zvezek izvirnih pravljic (An Aunt With a Basket: A Booklet of Original Fairy Tales), 1938
