= Helmut Weise =

East German slalom canoeist

Medal record

Men's canoe slalom

Representing East Germany

World Championships
Silver medal – second place	1955 Tacen	C-2 team

Helmut Weise is an East German retired slalom canoeist who competed in the mid-1950s. He won a silver medal in the C-2 team event at the 1955 ICF Canoe Slalom World Championships in Tacen.
