= Dieter Fritzsche =

East German canoeist

Medal record

Men's canoe slalom

Representing East Germany

World Championships
Silver medal – second place	1955 Tacen	C-1 team

Dieter Fritzsche is a retired slalom canoeist who competed for East Germany in the mid-1950s. He won a silver medal in the C-1 team event at the 1955 ICF Canoe Slalom World Championships in Tacen.
