= Fabjan Kaliterna =

- Born: 20 January 1886; Split, Kingdom of Dalmatia, Austria-Hungary
- Died: 30 January 1952 (aged 66); Split, PR Croatia, FPR Yugoslavia
- Resting place: Lovrinac Cemetery
- Education: Higher Technical School in Prague
- Occupation: Architect
- Notable work: Oceanographic Institute
- Title: 16th President of HNK Hajduk Split
- Term: 5 January 1936 - 15 April 1936
- Predecessor: Vjenceslav Celigoj
- Successor: Pave Kamber
- Family: Luka Kaliterna (brother)

Fabjan Kaliterna (Note: Spelled as Fabijan in some sources.) (20 January 1886 – 30 January 1952) was a Croatian architect and sportsperson. Born into a large family of a humble background, Kaliterna graduated from the real-gymnasium in his hometown in 1906, after which he enrolled at the Higher Technical School in Prague from which he graduated in 1921.

Considered the "father of sports in Split", Kaliterna was one of four founders of the HNK Hajduk Split football club, founder of the "Gusar" rowing club and helped in the formation of the Jadran waterpolo-swimming club and the Labud sailing club. Aside from his club-founding activities, Kaliterna also held numerous sports functions; he was the 16th president of Hajduk during 1936, member of the Yugoslav Olympic Committee and the Split Olympic Sub-Committee, president of the Split Football Sub Federation and member of the organizational committee of the 1932 European Rowing Championships.

On a professional level, Kaliterna was an accomplished architect having designed over two hundred buildings in Split and Dalmatia, among them, several sport-related buildings used to house Split-based sports clubs. Among his notable works is the building of the Institute of Oceanography & Fisheries in Split, constructed in 1920s and still in use today.

== See also ==
- Luka Kaliterna
- Bogumir Doležal
