= Jadranski Sport =

Croatian-language magazine

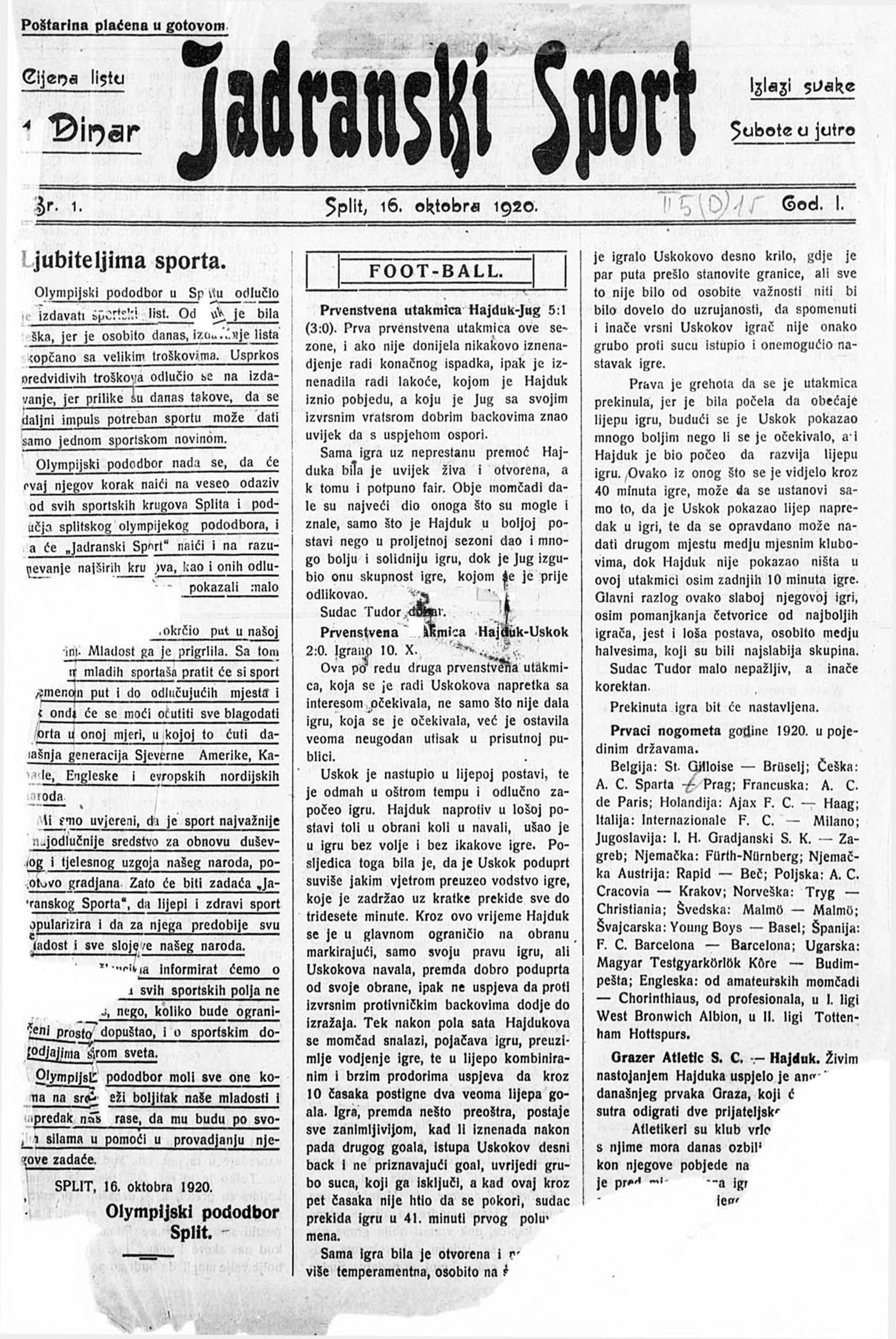
- Front page of the first issue
- Editor: Bogumir Doležal
- Frequency: Weekly
- Publisher: Split Olympic Sub-Committee
- First issue: October 16, 1920; 105 years ago
- Final issue: April 12, 1923
- Country: Kingdom of Serbs, Croats and Slovenes
- Based in: Split
- Language: Croatian

Jadranski Sport (transl. Adriatic Sport) was a weekly sports magazine published in Split, which was then part of the Kingdom of Serbs, Croats and Slovenes. Published by the Split Olympic Sub-Committee, it was an independent weekly for the first nine issues. After the tenth issue, it became a weekly supplement to the Novo Doba daily newspaper. The magazine's editor was Bogumir Doležal.
