= Bogumir Doležal =

Croatian sportsman and journalist

- Born: 1889; Bjelovar, Kingdom of Croatia-Slavonia, Austro-Hungarian Empire
- Died: 1959 (aged 69–70); Zagreb, SR Croatia
- Occupation: Sports journalist

Bogumir (Bogomir) Doležal (1889–1959) was a Croatian sportsman and sports journalist. He was a football player, professional bicycle racer, swimmer, sport statistician, handball player and trainer. He also served as a president and secretary of the football club HNK Hajduk Split.

== Biography ==
Although was born in Bjelovar in central Croatia, he moved to Split and started to play football. He was Hajduk's secretary from 1913 till 1920. Between 1936 and 1938 he was president of the club. He served as a Vice President of Yugoslavian Olympic Committee. He was a football referee (together with Fabjan Kaliterna, older brother of Luka Kaliterna). He was one of the founders of the rowing club HVK Gusar in 1919.

Doležal was founder and member of BK Split (cycling club) and HK Split (women's Czech football club). He wrote for sports magazine Jadranski sport ("Adriatic sport").

He was member and president of the swimming club "Baluni" between 1921 and 1923. He archived Hajduk's sports and clubs statistics during the World War II.

Some of his articles about football in Croatia were published in newspapers Jutarnji list and Slobodna Dalmacija.

His book Sport at the Adriatic was published in Belgrade in 1927.

He died in Zagreb.
