= Tučepi =

Town in Split-Dalmatia County, Croatia

- Town
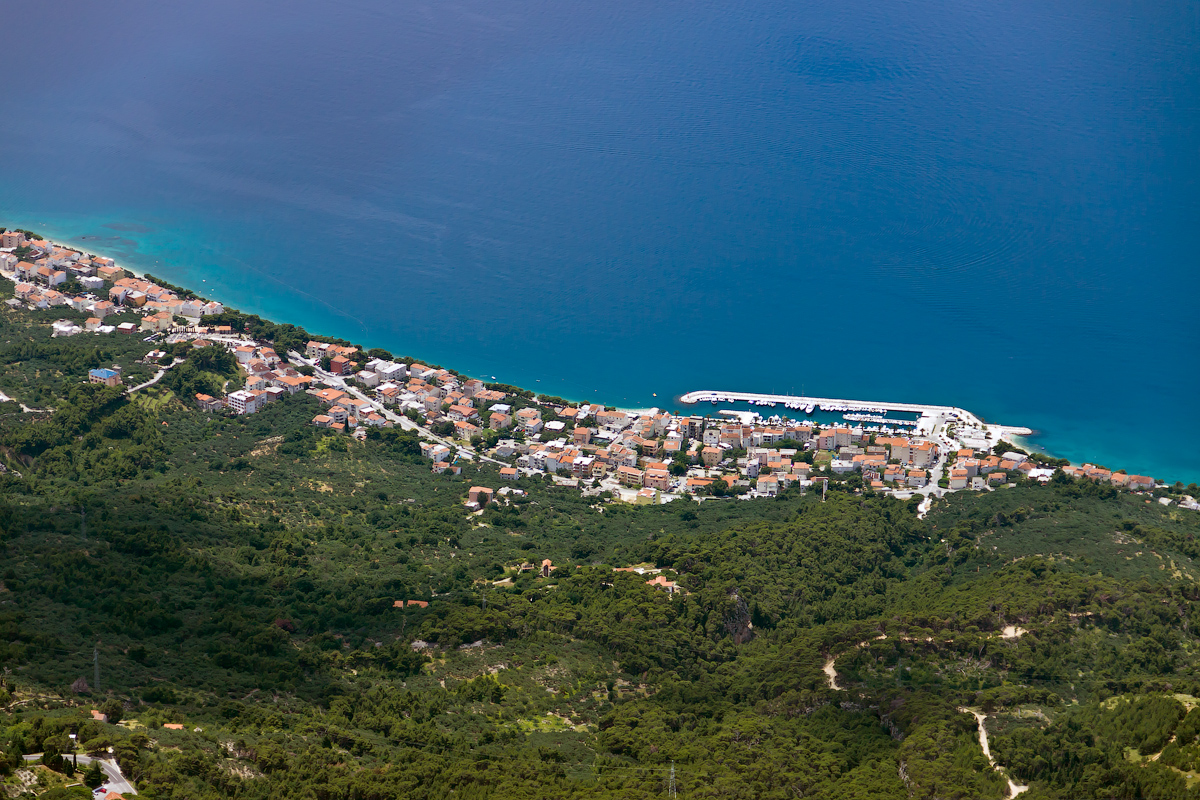
- View of Tučepi from Biokovo
- Interactive map of Tučepi
- Location of Makarska within Croatia
- Coordinates: 43°16′N 17°03′E
- Country: Croatia
- Region: Dalmatia
- County: Split-Dalmatia County

Area
  - Town: 22.5 km^{2} (8.7 sq mi)
  - Urban: 22.5 km^{2} (8.7 sq mi)
- Elevation: 0 m (0 ft)

Population (2021)
  - Town: 1,819
  - Density: 80.8/km^{2} (209/sq mi)
  - Urban: 1,819
  - Urban density: 80.8/km^{2} (209/sq mi)
- Time zone: UTC+1 (CET)
  - Summer (DST): UTC+2 (CEST)
- Postal code: 21300
- Area code: 021
- Website: tucepi.hr

Tučepi (pronounced [tǔtʃɛpi]) is a village and the only settlement in the eponymous municipality in the Split-Dalmatia County, Croatia. It is located on the Adriatic coast of Dalmatia known as Makarska riviera, about 5 km southeast of Makarska. It is a popular tourist destination thanks to its scenic coastline.

== History ==
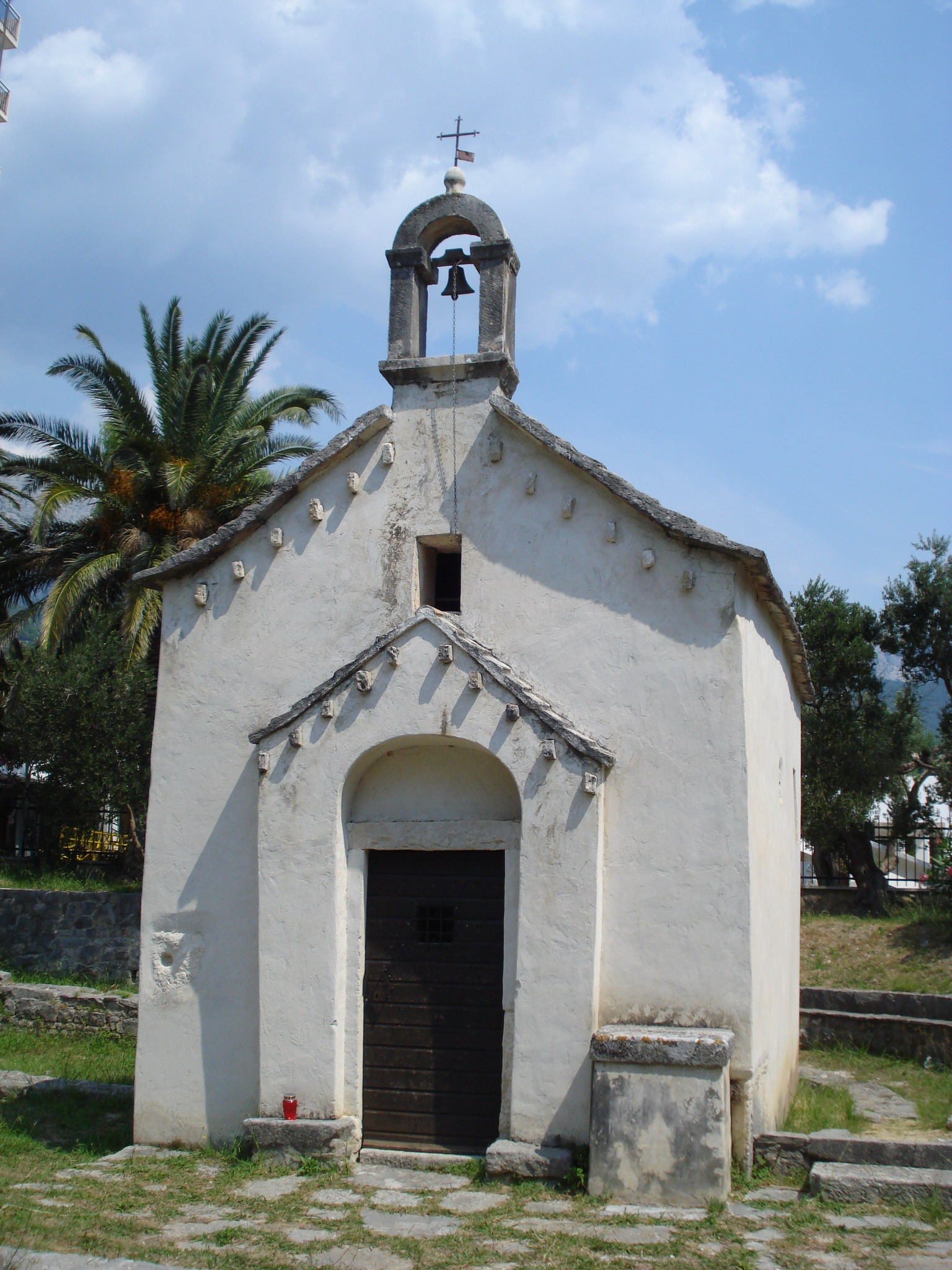
Old Church of St. George from 1311

The settlement of Tučepi was first settled four thousand years ago by the Illyrians. Until the earthquake of 1962, the majority of its inhabitants were living in scattered hamlets like Gornji Tučepi, Podpeč, Čovići, Srida Sela, Šimići and Podstup at the lower foot of the mountain Biokovo and since the 18th century these towns have seen a gradual process of depopulation, as their inhabitants began moving down to Tučepi-Kraj, now a 4-km long resort. Name from the Slavic tucha cloud

=== Legend ===
According to a local folk legend, the Venetian Doge Pietro I Candiano is buried here. In fact, the first of the four Venetian Doges of the Candiano family, Pietro, died on 18 September 887 in a battle against the Croatian tribe of Neretvans who defeated the Venetian fleet near Makarska. After his defeat the Venetians made a treaty with Prince Branimir in 888, agreeing to pay a tribute to the Croatian rulers for the right to sail and trade unmolested along the Adriatic, which they had to adhere to until the end of the 10th century.

== Demographics ==
Tučepi: Population trends 1857–2021
v

population	871	1091	1118	1289	1494	1693	1693	1533	1579	1593	1449	1500	1632	1760	1763	1931	1819
	1857	1869	1880	1890	1900	1910	1921	1931	1948	1953	1961	1971	1981	1991	2001	2011	2021

Sources: Croatian Bureau of Statistics publications

== Notable people ==
- Marin Brbić, former president of Hajduk Split
- Dražen Lalić, sociologist
- Žanamari Lalić, singer
- Ani Mijačika, tennis player

== See also ==
- List of mountains in Croatia
