= Blaženko Boban =

Croatian politician (born 1960)

Prefect of the Split-Dalmatia County
- Incumbent
- Assumed office 4 June 2017
- Preceded by: Zlatko Ževrnja

Member of the Croatian Parliament
- In office 28 December 2015 – 4 June 2017
- Constituency: IX electoral district

Mayor of Solin
- In office 2005 – 31 May 2016
- Succeeded by: Dalibor Ninčević

Personal details
- Born: 27 August 1960 (age 66) Split, PR Croatia, FPR Yugoslavia
- Party: Croatian Democratic Union
- Spouse: Marica Boban
- Children: 3
- Education: University of Split

Blaženko Boban (born 27 August 1960) is a Croatian politician serving as Prefect of Split-Dalmatia County since 2017. And was also the city mayor of Solin from 2005 up until 31 May 2016 when he was succeeded by Dalibor Ninčević.
