= List of prefects of Split-Dalmatia County =

This is a list of prefects of Split-Dalmatia County.

== Prefects of Split-Dalmatia County (1993–present) ==
Croatian Democratic Union (HDZ)

No.	Portrait	Name (Born–Died)	Term of Office		Party
1		Nadan Vidošević (1960–)	4 May 1993	4 February 1994	HDZ
2		Kruno Peronja (1955–)	4 February 1994	1 July 1997	HDZ
3		Branimir Lukšić (1935–2014)	1 July 1997	26 June 2003	HDZ
(2)		Kruno Peronja (1955–)	26 June 2003	17 June 2005	HDZ
4		Ante Sanader (1960–)	17 June 2005	7 June 2013	HDZ
5		Zlatko Ževrnja (1961–)	7 June 2013	4 June 2017	HDZ
6		Blaženko Boban (1960–)	4 June 2017	Incumbent	HDZ

== See also ==
- Split-Dalmatia County
- List of county prefects of Croatia
