= Šmarna Gora District =

Slovenian city district

Coordinates: 46°07′08″N 14°27′51″E

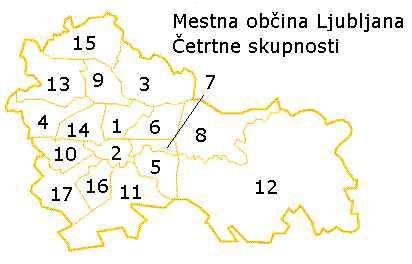
Map of districts in Ljubljana. The Šmarna Gora district is number 15.

The Šmarna Gora District (Slovene: Četrtna skupnost Šmarna gora), or simply Šmarna Gora, is a district (mestna četrt) of the City Municipality of Ljubljana, the capital of Slovenia. It has been named after Mount Saint Mary, an inselberg in the north of the city of Ljubljana.
