= Mount Saint Mary =

Mountain

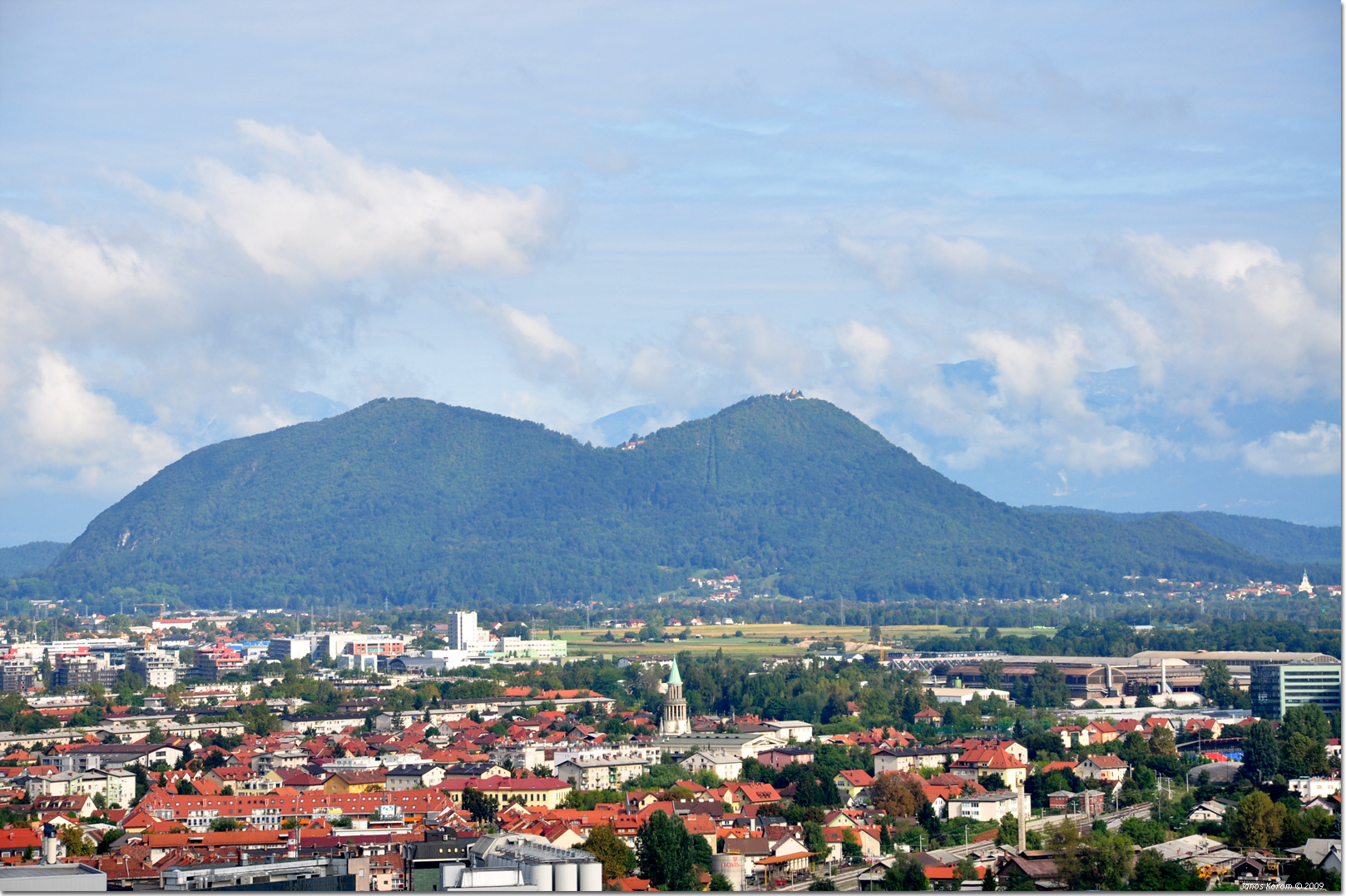
- View of Mount Saint Mary from Castle Hill

Highest point
- Elevation: 676 m (2,218 ft)
- Coordinates: 46°7′47″N 14°27′49″E

Naming
- Native name: Šmarna gora (Slovene)

Geography
- Location within Slovenia
- Location: Slovenia

Mount Saint Mary (Slovene: Šmarna gora, German: Großkahlenberg or Kallenberg), originally known as Holm, is an inselberg in the north of Ljubljana, the capital of Slovenia. The mountain is part of the city's Šmarna Gora District. It is the highest hill in the city and a popular hiking destination.

The mountain has two peaks: Mount Saint Mary (Šmarna gora; 669 metres, 2,195 ft) to the east and Grmada (676 m, 2,218 ft) to the west. It resembles the humps of a Bactrian camel or woman's breasts.

== Name and history ==
The toponym contains the archaic contraction Šmarna for Sveta Marijina 'St. Mary's'. The name of the western peak, Grmada, literally means 'heap, pile (of wood for a bonfire)'. The slightly lower eastern peak lends its name to the mountain as a whole. The mountain was first mentioned in written sources in 1296.

The bell tower on the top of the mountain rings each day half an hour before midday. The ringing of the bell commemorates the repulse of an Ottoman raid. The higher Grmada was used to burn bonfires to warn people of incoming Ottoman raids in the past.

In the late 17th century, the mountain and the church upon it were described by the polyhistor Johann Weikhard von Valvasor in The Glory of the Duchy of Carniola as a pilgrimage destination.

== Flora ==
The southern slope of the mountain is wooded with downy oak and hop hornbeam, while the northern slope is covered by a beech forest. Altogether, over 830 floral and 260 fungal species have been identified on the mountain. A circular forest educational trail set up in 1974 connects the two peaks of Mount Saint Mary.

== Church ==
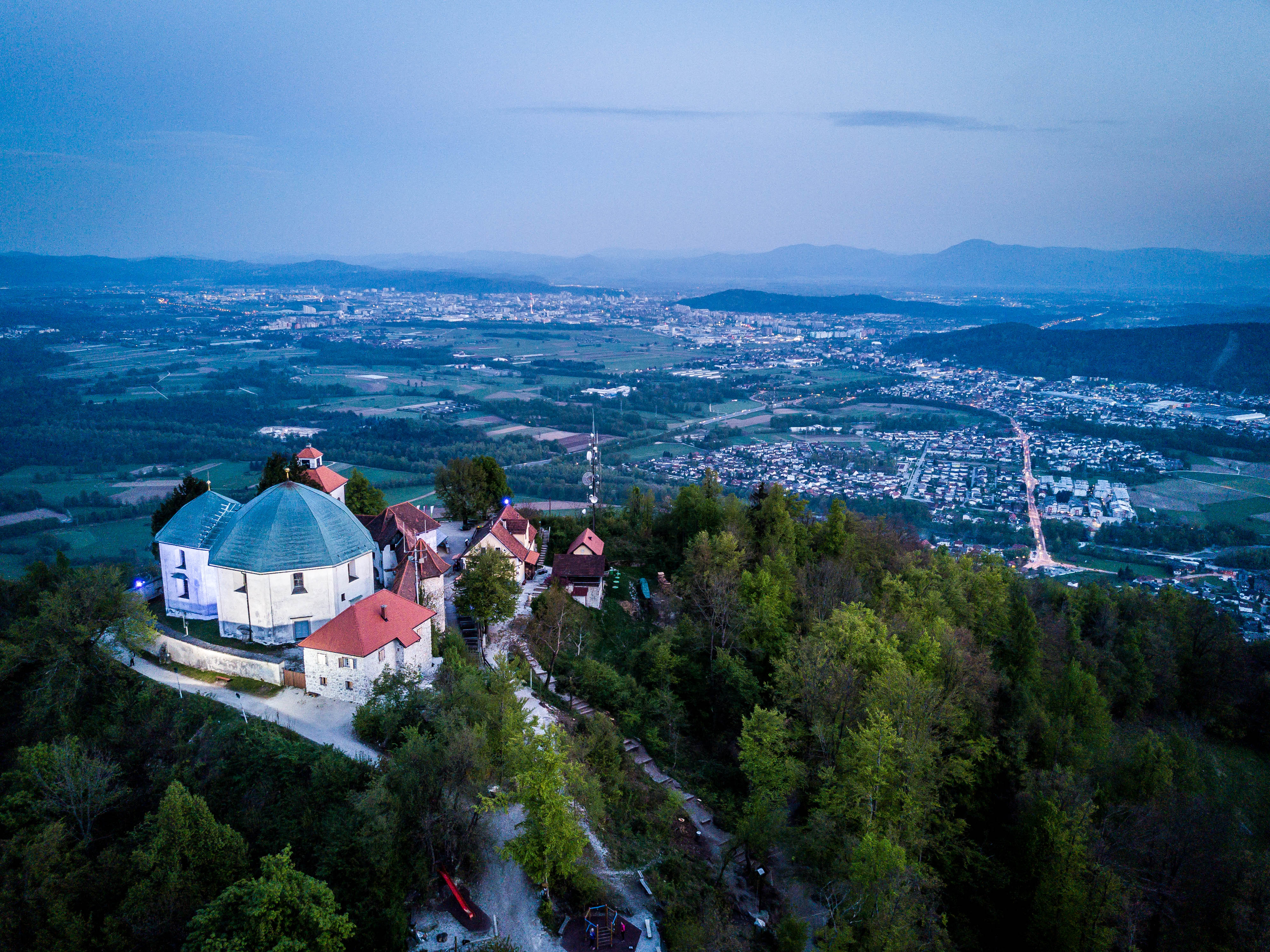
View of Mount Saint Mary from the air

The pilgrimage church on Mount Saint Mary was built in the Baroque style in 1711–12 and replaced an older Gothic church (first mentioned in 1324). It was built by the master builder Gregor Maček, Sr. The large octagonal nave and the smaller square chancel are connected into a single church space covered by two domes. The church has five altars. The frescoes were painted in the 1840s by the Slovenian painter Matevž Langus, whose illusionistic style of painting was an attempt to open up the real church space into the supernatural.

== Surroundings ==
The hill is surrounded by the villages of Vikrče and Spodnje Pirniče to the west, Zavrh pod Šmarno Goro to the north, and the former villages (now part of Ljubljana) of Šmartno pod Šmarno Goro and Tacen to the southeast. In clear conditions, the mountain offers a view across much of Slovenia, from Mount Triglav and Mount Stol on the northeastern Austrian–Italian border to Mount Krim, Mount Snežnik, and Trdina Peak (Slovene: Trdinov vrh) on the Croatian border to the southwest. Nearby hills include Bare Hill (Golo brdo), Tošč Face (Toško čelo), Rožnik, and Rašica.
