= List of HNK Hajduk Split presidents =

Hrvatski nogometni klub Hajduk Split is a professional football club based in Split, Croatia, which plays in the Prva HNL. This chronological list comprises all those who have held the position of president of Hajduk Split from 1911, when the first president was appointed, to the present day.

The first president of Hajduk Split was Kruno Kolombatović, who was in charge from 1911 to 1912. Longest serving president in Hajduk's history was Tito Kirigin who spent ten years at the position. He was also the most successful president, with Hajduk winning nine trophies during his tenure: four Yugoslav First League championships and five Yugoslav Cup titles. The current president is Ivan Bilić, who was appointed on 25 April 2024.

Hajduk had numerous presidents over the course of their history, some of which have been honorary presidents, here is a complete list of them:

== Chairmen of the Board ==
Tenure	President	Trophies						Total
Tenure	President	Domestic					Int.	Total
Tenure	President	YL	YC	CL	CC	CS	Int.	Total
Feb - Sep 1911	(Austria-Hungary) Kruno Kolombatović	N/A					–	–
Sep 1911 - Oct 1912	(Austria-Hungary) Ante Katunarić	N/A					–	–
Oct 1912 - Jul 1913	(Austria-Hungary) Petar Bonetti	N/A					–	–
Jul 1913 - Oct 1913	(Austria-Hungary) Grga Anđelinović	N/A					–	–
Oct 1913 - Jul 1921	(Austria-Hungary) (Kingdom of Yugoslavia) Vladimir Šore	N/A					–	–
Jul 1921 - Nov 1921	(Kingdom of Yugoslavia) Silvije Matulić	N/A					–	–
Nov 1921 - Sep 1923	(Kingdom of Yugoslavia) Vjekoslav Fulgosi	N/A					–	–
Sep 1923 - Nov 1924	(Kingdom of Yugoslavia) Antun Grgin	–	–	N/A			–	–
Nov 1924 - Oct 1925	(Kingdom of Yugoslavia) Vjekoslav Fulgosi	–	–	N/A			–	–
Oct 1925 - Nov 1926	(Kingdom of Yugoslavia) Silvije Bulat	–	–	N/A			–	–
Nov 1926 - Oct 1927	(Kingdom of Yugoslavia) Antun Grgin	1	–	N/A			–	1
Oct 1927 - Dec 1930	(Kingdom of Yugoslavia) Ante Kovačić	1	–	N/A			–	1
Dec 1930 - Jan 1932	(Kingdom of Yugoslavia) Žarko Dešković	–	–	N/A			–	–
Jan 1932 - Jan 1933	(Kingdom of Yugoslavia) Ante Starčević	–	–	N/A			–	–
Jan 1933 - Jan 1936	(Kingdom of Yugoslavia) Vjenceslav Celigoj	–	–	N/A			–	–
Jan 1936 - Apr 1936	(Kingdom of Yugoslavia) Fabjan Kaliterna	–	–	N/A			–	–
Apr 1936 - Jan 1938	(Kingdom of Yugoslavia) Pave Kamber	–	–	N/A			–	–
Jan 1938 - Jul 1938	(Kingdom of Yugoslavia) Mihovil Novak	–	–	N/A			–	–
Jul 1938 - Jun 1939	(Kingdom of Yugoslavia) Petar Machiedo	–	–	N/A			–	–
Jun 1939 - Aug 1941	(Kingdom of Yugoslavia) Janko Rodin	–	–	1^{1}	N/A		–	1
May 1944 - Oct 1945	(Democratic Federal Yugoslavia) Janko Rodin	–	–	1^{1}	N/A		–	1
Oct 1945 - Dec 1946	(Socialist Federal Republic of Yugoslavia) Humbert Fabris	–	–	1^{1}	N/A		–	1
Dec 1946 - Nov 1947	(Socialist Federal Republic of Yugoslavia) Nikola Papić	–	–	N/A			–	–
Nov 1947 - Jan 1949	(Socialist Federal Republic of Yugoslavia) Humbert Fabris	–	–	N/A			–	–
Jan 1949 - Nov 1949	(Socialist Federal Republic of Yugoslavia) Ivo Raić	–	–	N/A			–	–
Nov 1949 - Dec 1950	(Socialist Federal Republic of Yugoslavia) Ante Jurjević Baja	1	–	N/A			–	1
Dec 1950 - Dec 1953	(Socialist Federal Republic of Yugoslavia) Marin Vidan	1	–	N/A			–	1
Dec 1953 - Mar 1958	(Socialist Federal Republic of Yugoslavia) Marko Markovina	1	–	N/A			–	1
Mar 1958 - Jul 1962	(Socialist Federal Republic of Yugoslavia) Petar Alfirević	–	–	N/A			–	–
Jul 1962 - Aug 1964	(Socialist Federal Republic of Yugoslavia) Petar Rončević	–	–	N/A			–	–
Aug 1964 - Jan 1966	(Socialist Federal Republic of Yugoslavia) Josip Košta	–	–	N/A			–	–
Jar 1966 - Mar 1970	(Socialist Federal Republic of Yugoslavia) Josip Grubelić	–	1	N/A			–	1
Mar 1970 - Feb 1980	(Socialist Federal Republic of Yugoslavia) Tito Kirigin	4	5	N/A			–	9
Feb 1980 - May 1981	(Socialist Federal Republic of Yugoslavia) Ante Skataretiko	–	–	N/A			–	–
May 1981 - Jun 1984	(Socialist Federal Republic of Yugoslavia) Ivo Šantić	–	1	N/A			–	1
Jun 1984 - Jun 1985	(Socialist Federal Republic of Yugoslavia) Ante Kovač	–	–	N/A			–	–
Jun 1985 - Nov 1986	(Socialist Federal Republic of Yugoslavia) Joško Vidošević	–	–	N/A			–	–
Nov 1986 - Feb 1988	(Socialist Federal Republic of Yugoslavia) Vlado Bučević	–	1	N/A			–	1
Feb 1988 - Jul 1990	(Socialist Federal Republic of Yugoslavia) Kolja Marasović	–	–	N/A			–	–
Jul 1990 - Dec 1992	(Socialist Federal Republic of Yugoslavia) (Croatia) Stjepan Jukić-Peladić	–	1	1	–	1	–	3
Dec 1992 - Sep 1996	(Croatia) Nadan Vidošević	N/A		2	2	2	–	6
Sep 1996 - Jun 1997	(Croatia) Anđelko Gabrić	N/A		–	–	–	–	–
Jun 1997 - Apr 2000	(Croatia) Željko Kovačević	N/A		–	1	–	–	1
Jun 2000 - Sep 2007	(Croatia) Branko Grgić	N/A		3	1	2	–	6
Jan 2008 - Mar 2008	(Croatia) Željko Jerkov	N/A		–	–	–	–	–
Jun 2008 - Aug 2009	(Croatia) Mate Tomislav Peroš	N/A		–	–	–	–	–
Aug 2009 - Dec 2010	(Croatia) Joško Svaguša	N/A		–	1	–	–	1
Dec 2010 - Apr 2011	(Croatia) Josip Grbić	N/A		–	–	–	–	–
Apr 2011 - Jul 2012	(Croatia) Hrvoje Maleš	N/A		–	–	–	–	–
Jul 2012 - Apr 2016	(Croatia) Marin Brbić	N/A		–	1	–	–	1
Apr 2016 - May 2016	(Croatia) Marijana Bošnjak (interim)	N/A		–	–	–	–	–
May 2016 - Apr 2018	(Croatia) Ivan Kos	N/A		–	–	–	–	–
Jul 2018 - Mar 2019	(Croatia) (Kosovo) Jasmin Huljaj	N/A		–	–	–	–	–
Mar 2019 - Jul 2020	(Croatia) Marin Brbić	N/A		–	–	–	–	–
Oct 2020 - Apr 2024	(Croatia) Lukša Jakobušić	N/A		–	2	–	–	–
Apr 2024	(Croatia) Marinka Akrap (interim)	N/A		–	–	–	–	–
Apr 2024 -	(Croatia) Ivan Bilić	N/A		–	–	–	–	–
Total	1911–2023	9	9	9	8	5	–	40

^{1} Croatian First League was temporarily played during the 1940s, under the flags of Banate of Croatia, Independent State of Croatia and Socialist Republic of Croatia. Hajduk won a title in Banate of Croatia (1940), two in SR Croatia (1945, 1946) while refusing to participate in championships during Independent State of Croatia (1941–45).

== Presidents ==
=== Presidents of the Supervisory Committee ===
Name	From–To
(Croatia) Ivan Kuret	2008–09
(Croatia) Petroslav Sapunar	2009–11
(Croatia) Josip Paladino	2011–13
(Croatia) Branka Ramljak	2013–15
(Croatia) Ljubo Pavasović-Visković	2015–16
(Croatia) Slaven Marasović	2016–18
(Croatia) Benjamin Perasović	2018–

=== Presidents of the Hajduk General Assembly ===
Name	From–To
(Socialist Federal Republic of Yugoslavia) Tonći Marača	1988–1990
(Socialist Federal Republic of Yugoslavia) (Croatia) Ivo Petrinović	1990–1992
(Croatia) Vinko Cuzzi	1992–1997
(Croatia) Luka Roić	1997
(Croatia) Damir Vukelja	1997–1998
(Croatia) Šime Luketin	1998–2000
(Croatia) Nedeljko Špiro Erceg	2000–2004
(Croatia) Ante Nosić	2004–2008
(Croatia) Vinko Radovani	2008–

=== Presidents of the Hajduk Sports Association ===
Active from 1948 to 1949

Name	From–To
(Socialist Federal Republic of Yugoslavia) Marin Krstulović	1948–1949

=== Presidents of the Hajduk Conference ===
Active from 1984 to 1988

Name	From–To
(Socialist Federal Republic of Yugoslavia) Ante Jurjević	1984–1986
(Socialist Federal Republic of Yugoslavia) Ante Čičo Ganza	1986–1987
(Socialist Federal Republic of Yugoslavia) Tonći Marača	1987–1988
