= Split-Dalmatia County =

County in southern Croatia

Coordinates: 43°10′N 16°30′E

Split-Dalmatia County Splitsko-dalmatinska županija (Croatian)
- County
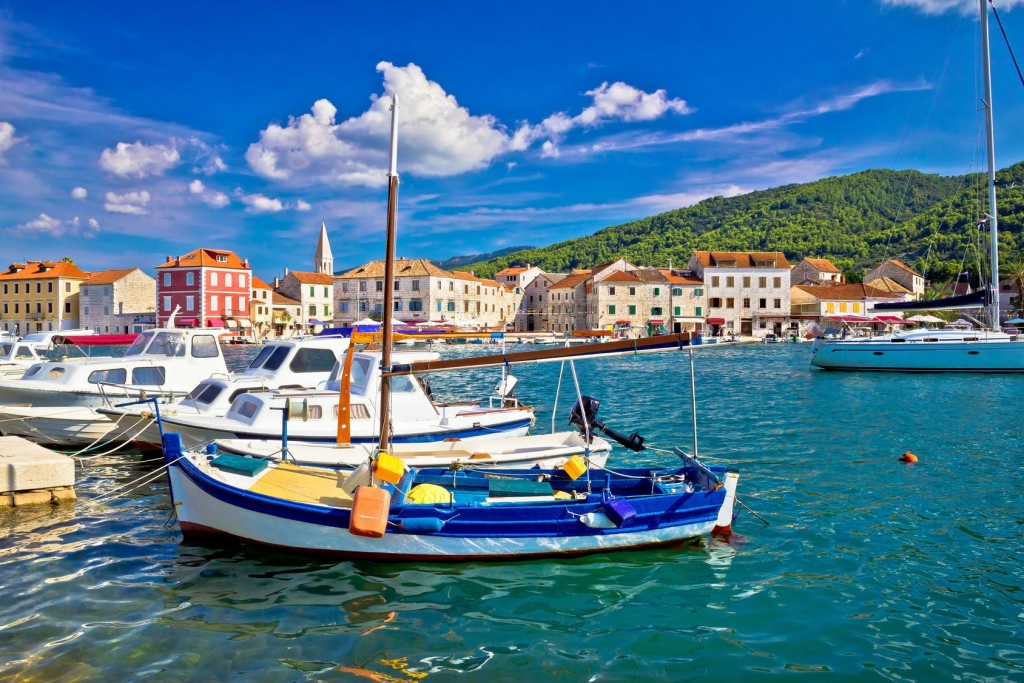
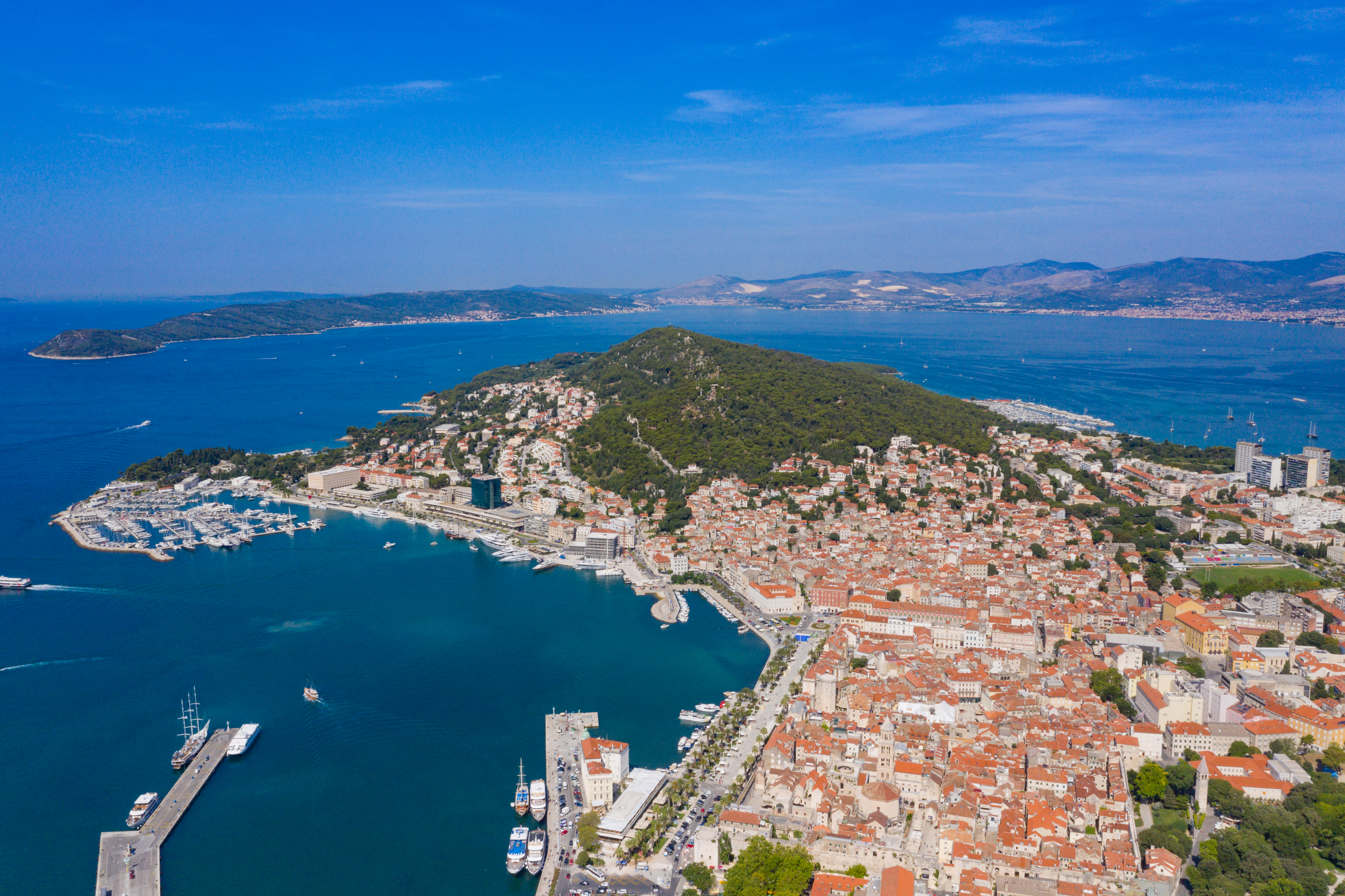
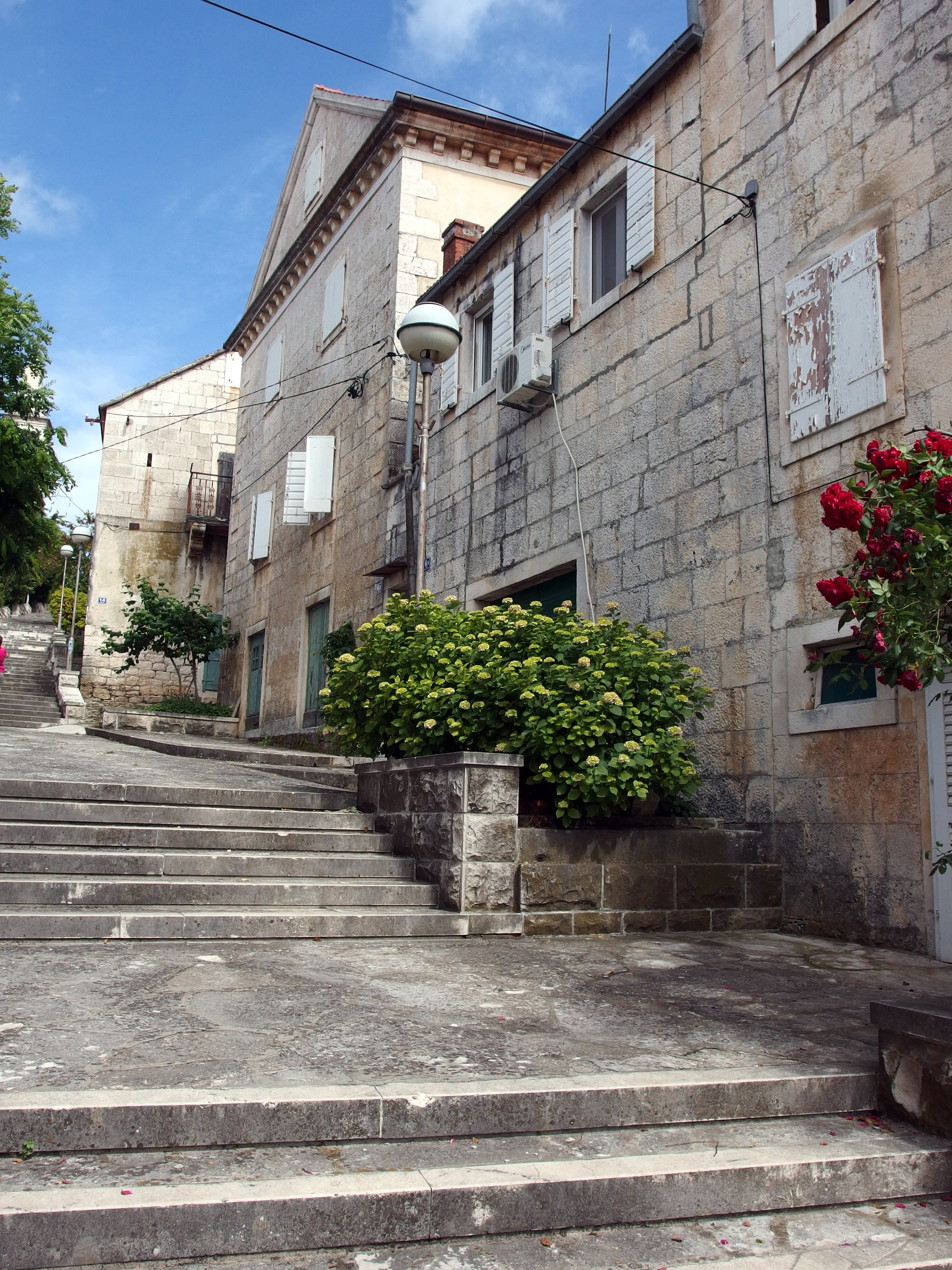
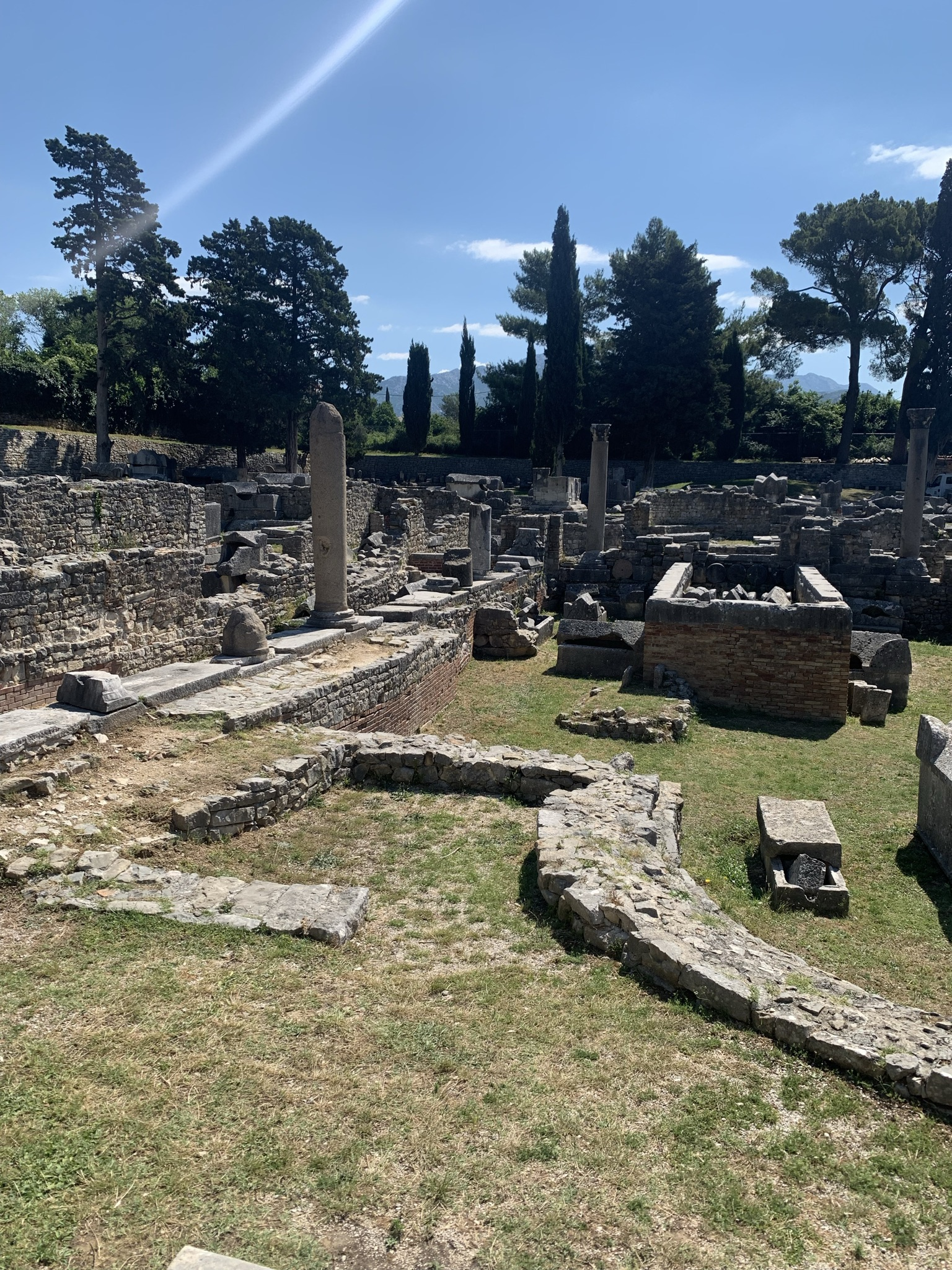
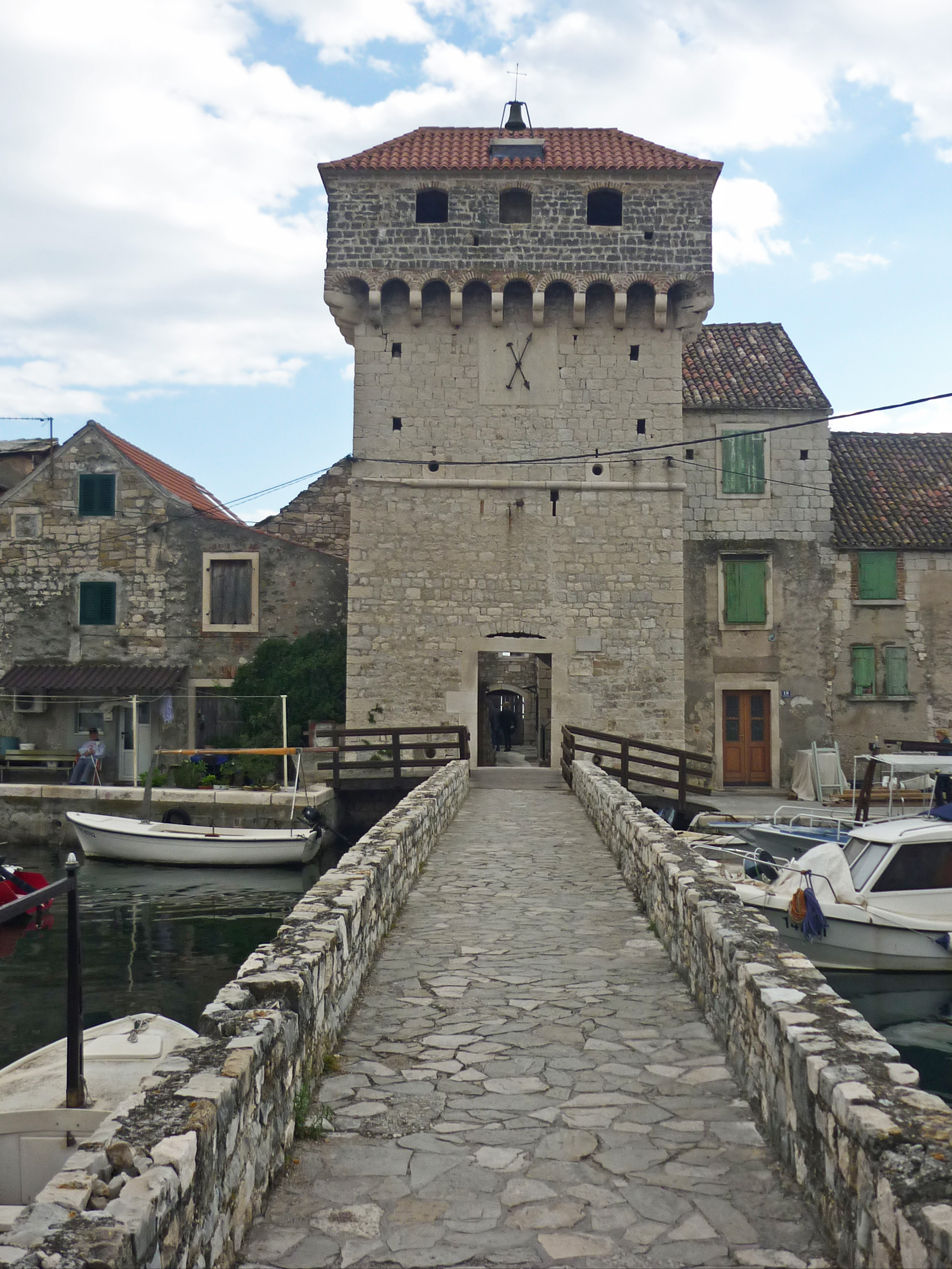
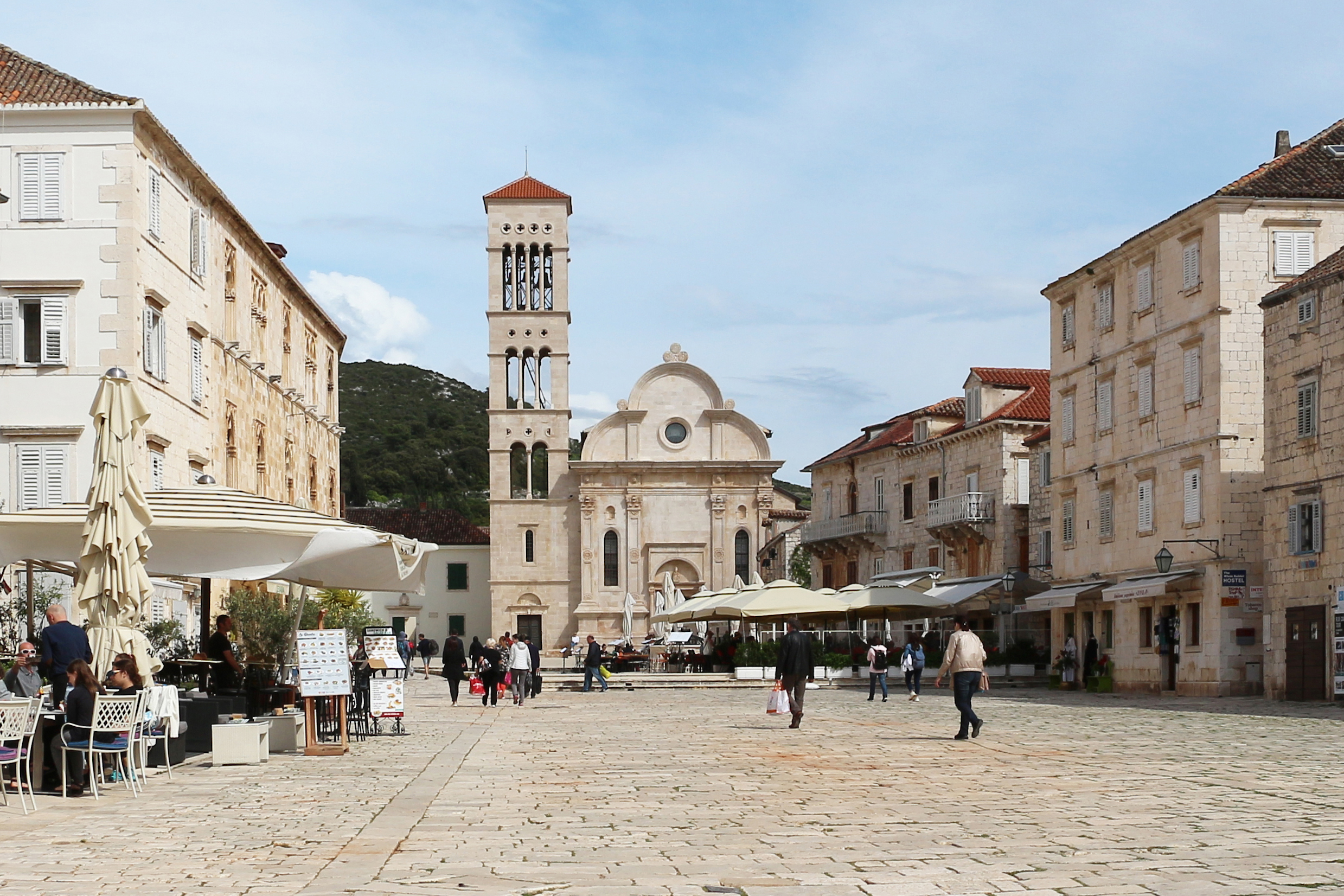
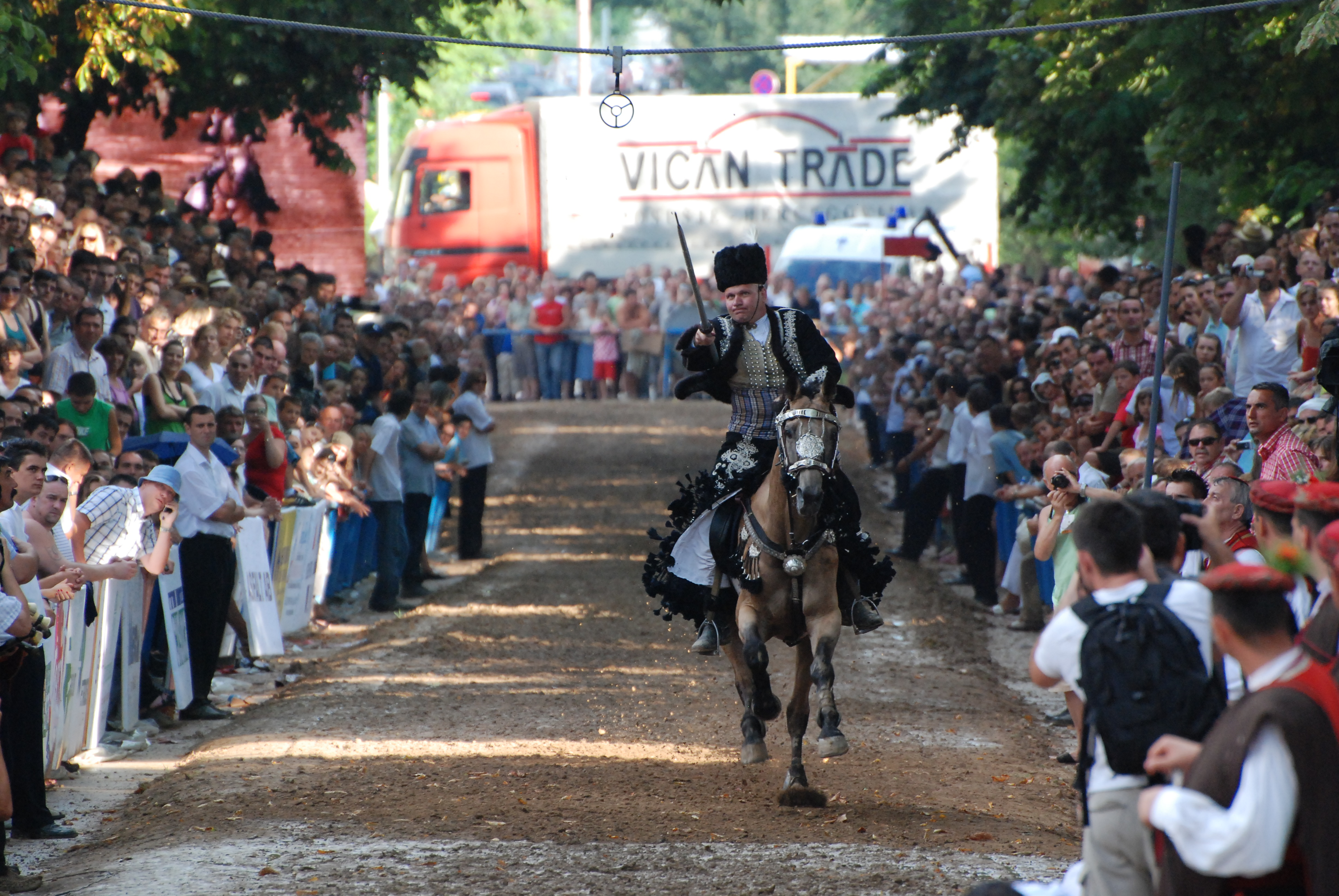
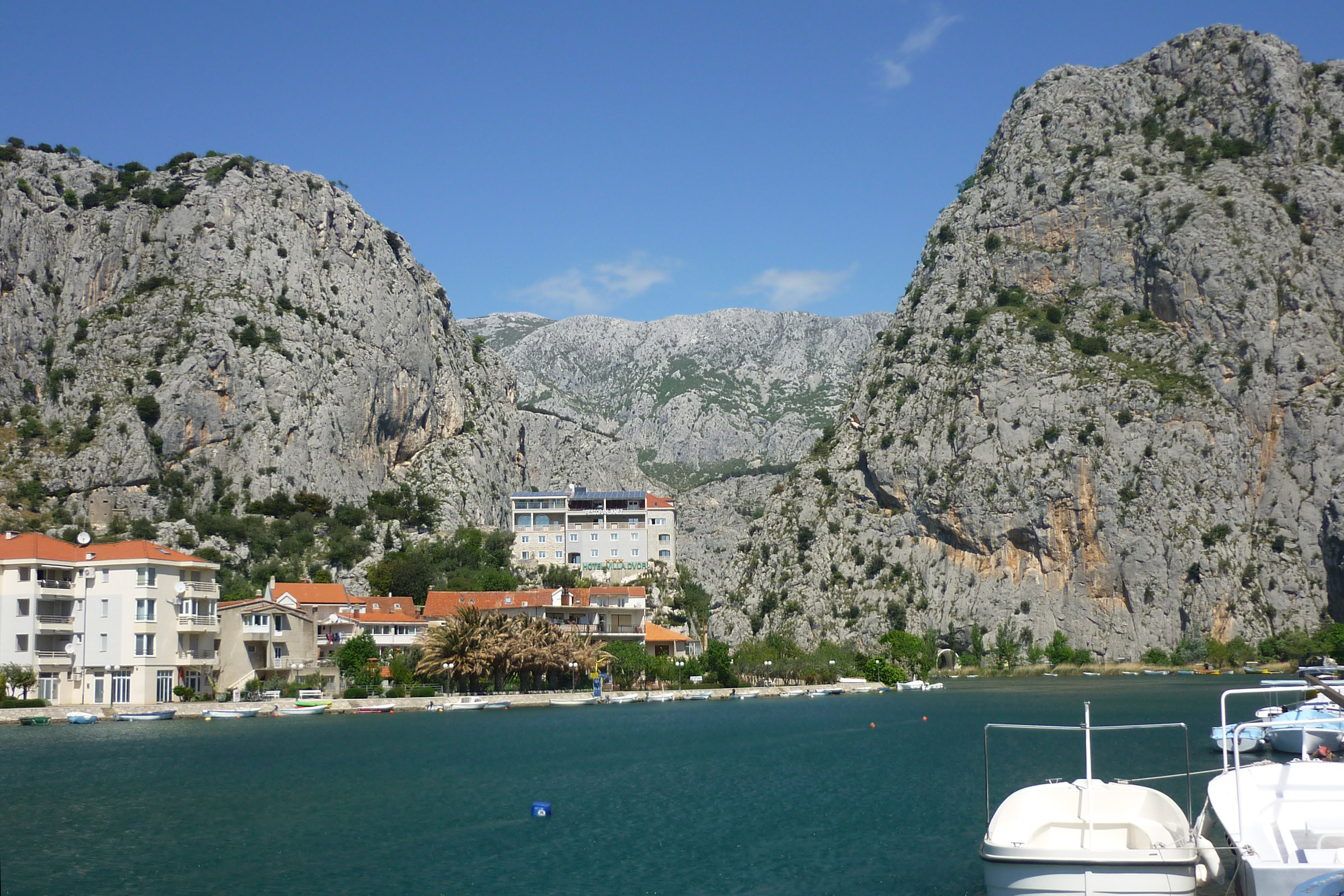
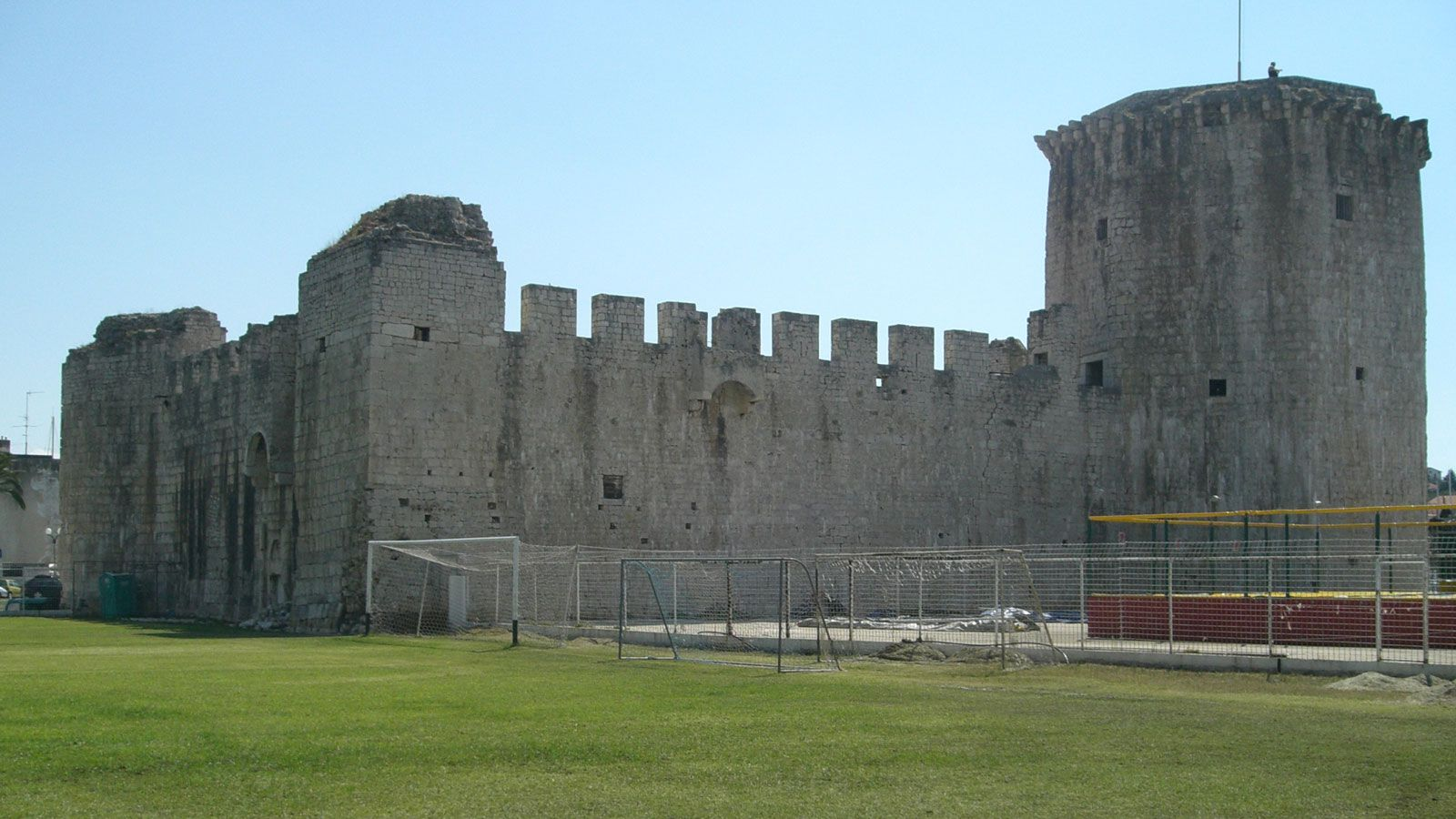
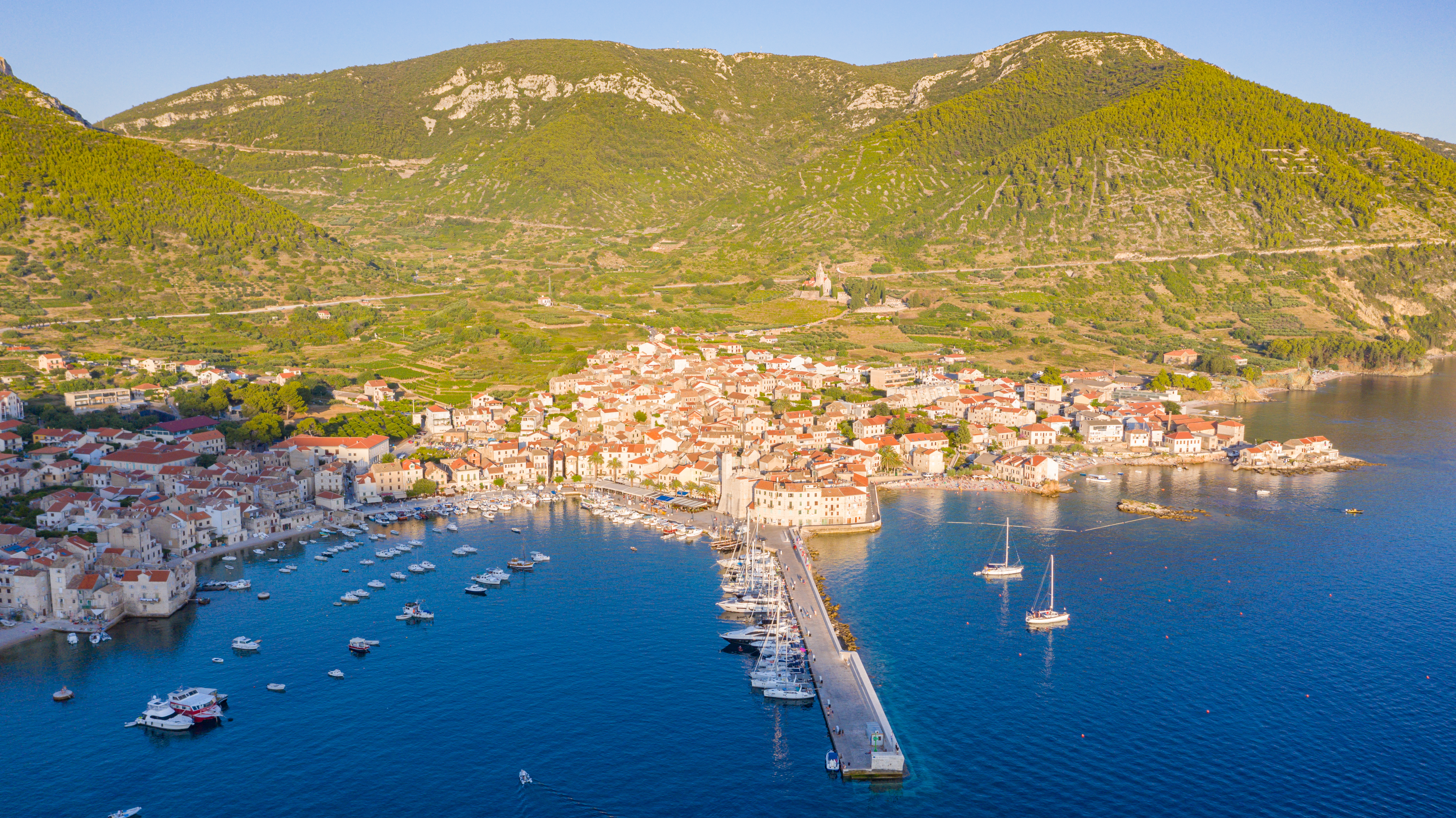
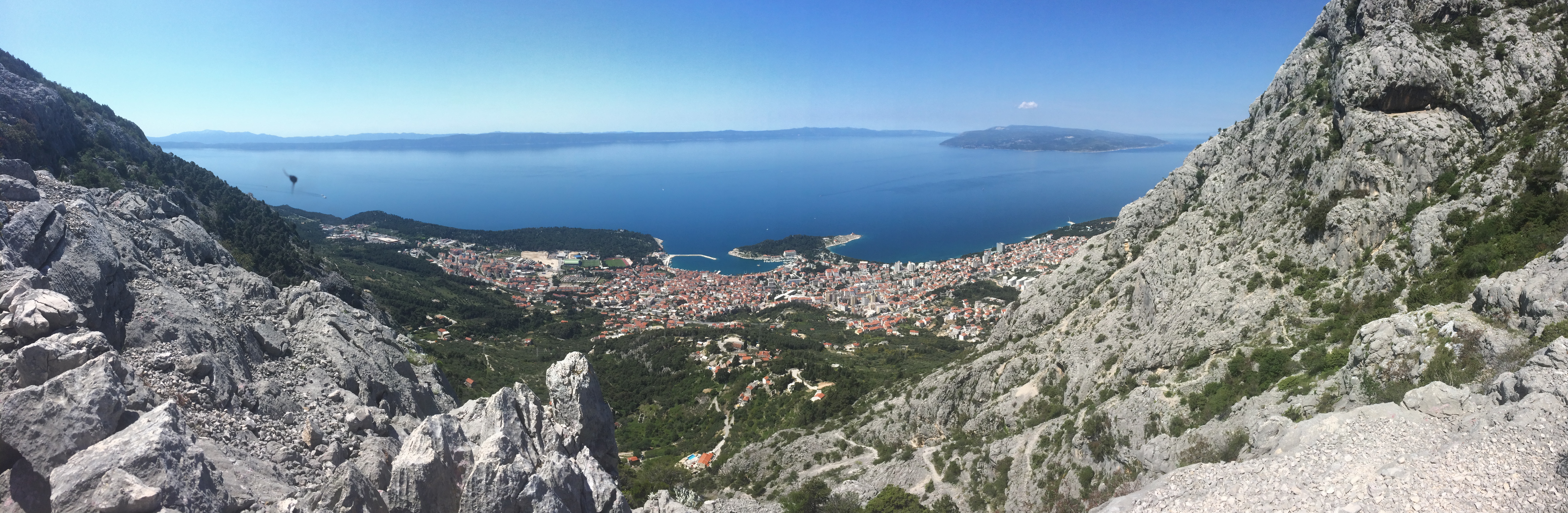

- Flag Coat of arms

- Split-Dalmatia County within Croatia
- Country: Croatia
- County seat: Split

Government
  - Župan (Prefect): Blaženko Boban (HDZ)

Area
  - Total: 4,540 km^{2} (1,750 sq mi)

Population (2021)
  - Total: 425,412
  - Density: 93.7/km^{2} (243/sq mi)
- Area code: 021
- ISO 3166 code: HR-17
- HDI (2022): 0.871 very high · 5th
- Website: http://www.dalmacija.hr

Split-Dalmatia County (Croatian: Splitsko-dalmatinska županija [splîtsko-dalmǎtiːnskaː ʒupǎnija]) is a central-southern Dalmatian county in Croatia. The administrative center is Split. The population of the county is 455,242 (2011). The land area is 4.540 km^{2}, the total area is 14.106,40 km^{2}. Split-Dalmatia County is Croatia's most rapidly urbanising and developing region, as economic opportunities and living standards are among the highest alongside capital Zagreb and Istria County.

Physically, the county is divided into three main parts: an elevated hinterland (Dalmatinska zagora) with numerous karst fields; a narrow coastal strip with high population density; and the islands. Parts of the Dinaric Alps, including Dinara itself, form the border with Bosnia and Herzegovina while the Kozjak, Mosor and Biokovo mountains separate the coastal strip from the hinterland.

Important economic activities include agriculture, manufacturing and fishing, though the most important one is tourism.

The county is linked to the rest of Croatia by the newly built four-lane Split-Zadar-Karlovac-Zagreb highway and the Lika railway. Split Airport is the busiest airport in the region.

In the hinterland, the larger towns are Sinj (pop. 11,500 town, 25,373 with villages), Imotski (4,350) and Vrgorac (2,200).

Besides the largest city, Split (189,000 city proper, 250,000 including Kaštela and Solin), the towns on the coast are Trogir (11,000), Omiš (6,500) and Makarska (13,400).

On the islands, the populations are smaller due to high levels of emigration, but are still mostly urban in character. The main townships are: Supetar (3,300) on the island of Brač; Hvar town (3,700) and Stari Grad (1,900) on Hvar; and Vis town (1,800) and Komiža (1,500) on Vis.

== History ==
The name Dalmatia comes from an Illyrian tribe called the Dalmatae who inhabited the area of the eastern Adriatic coast in the 1st millennium BC. It was part of the Illyrian kingdom from the 4th century BC until the Illyrian Wars in the 220s BC and 168 BC when the Roman Republic established its protectorate south of the river Neretva. Dalmatia as a geographical name was in use probably from the second half of the 2nd century BC for the area spanning the eastern Adriatic coast between the Krka and Neretva rivers. It was slowly incorporated into Roman possessions until the province of Illyricum was formally established c. 32–27 BC.

Dalmatia became part of the Roman province of Illyricum. In 9 AD, the Dalmatians raised the final of a series of revolts together with the Pannonians, but it was finally crushed, and in 10 AD, Illyricum was split into two provinces, Pannonia and Dalmatia which spread into larger area inland to cover all of the Dinaric Alps and most of the eastern Adriatic coast. Dalmatia was the birthplace of the Roman Emperor Diocletian, who constructed Diocletian's Palace in the core of what is now Split.

== Administrative division ==
Split-Dalmatia County is divided into 16 cities and 39 municipalities. Note that both cities and municipalities are administrative divisions immediately under the county, on the same level.

Town / municipality	Population (2011 census)	Area (km^{2})
Cities and towns
Hvar	4,251	75.50
Imotski	10,764	73.25
Kaštela	38,667	57.67
Komiža	1,526	48.00
Makarska	13,834	28.00
Omiš	14,936	266.20
Sinj	24,826	181.00
Solin	23,926	18.37
Split	178,102	79.33
Stari Grad	2,781	52.59
Supetar	4,074	30.00
Trilj	9,109	267.00
Trogir	13,192	39.10
Vis	1,934	52.00
Vrgorac	6,572	284.00
Vrlika	2,177	243.00
Municipalities
Baška Voda	2,775	19.00
Bol	1,630	23.00
Brela	1,703	20.00
Cista Provo	2,335	98.00
Dicmo	2,802	68.00
Dugi Rat	7,092	10.80
Dugopolje	3,469	63.50
Gradac	3,261	49.00
Hrvace	3,617	210.00
Jelsa	3,582	146.28
Klis	4,801	176.10
Lećevica	583	87.66
Lokvičići	807	31.11
Lovreć	1,699	105.25
Marina	4,595	108.80
Milna	1,034	35.00
Muć	3,882	210.80
Nerežišća	862	79.00
Okrug	3,349	9.80
Otok	5,474	95.00
Podbablje	4,680	41.76
Podgora	2,518	52.00
Podstrana	9,129	11.52
Postira	1,559	47.00
Prgomet	673	77.23
Primorski Dolac	770	31.23
Proložac	3,802	85.60
Pučišća	2,171	106.00
Runovići	2,416	60.21
Seget	4,854	77.90
Selca	1,804	53.00
Sućuraj	463	44.65
Sutivan	822	22.00
Šestanovac	1,958	88.90
Šolta	1,700	58.98
Tučepi	1,931	16.00
Zadvarje	289	13.40
Zagvozd	1,188	124.09
Zmijavci	2,048	13.82
Split-Dalmatia total	455,798	4,572.00

== County government ==
Distribution of seats in the Assembly of the Split-Dalmatia County, 2025 election

The current county prefect (župan) is Blaženko Boban (HDZ), who was first elected to the position in the 2017. Stipe Čogelja and Ante Šošić serve as deputy prefects.

The county assembly is composed of 47 representatives from the following parties (as of 2025):

- Croatian Democratic Union (HDZ), Homeland Movement (DP): 22
- Centre (CENTAR), Independent Youth List (NLM): 8
- Social Democratic Party of Croatia (SDP), We Can! (Možemo!), DIREKT: 8
- The Bridge (Most), Home and National Rally (DOMiNO), Croatian Party of Rights (HSP): 6
- Croatian Civic Party (HGS): 3

== Demographics ==
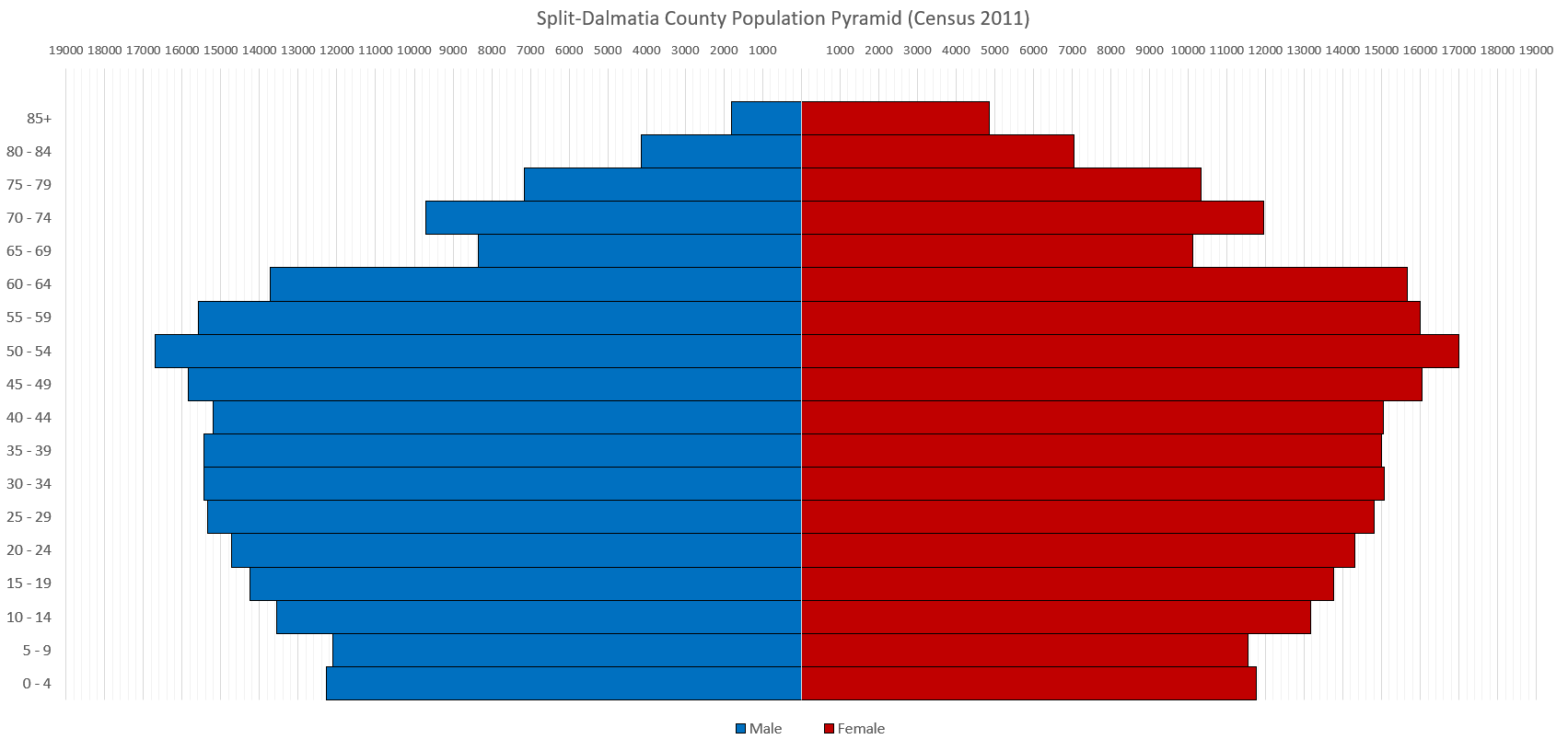
Population pyramid of Split-Dalmatia county per the 2011 Census

Historical populations of Split-Dalmatia County

Year	Pop.	±%
1857	164,242	—
1869	182,405	+11.1%
1880	195,741	+7.3%
1890	222,030	+13.4%
1900	249,867	+12.5%
1910	268,187	+7.3%
1921	274,522	+2.4%
1931	292,321	+6.5%
1948	296,840	+1.5%

Year	Pop.	±%
1953	314,933	+6.1%
1961	339,686	+7.9%
1971	389,277	+14.6%
1981	436,680	+12.2%
1991	474,019	+8.6%
2001	463,676	−2.2%
2011	454,798	−1.9%
2021	425,412	−6.5%

census data

According to the 2011 census, Split-Dalmatia County has population of 454,798. Croats make up an absolute majority with 97.08% of the population.

Split-Dalmatia County: Population trends 1857–2021
v

population	164242	182405	195741	222030	249867	268187	274522	292321	296840	314933	339686	389277	436680	474019	463676	454798	425412
	1857	1869	1880	1890	1900	1910	1921	1931	1948	1953	1961	1971	1981	1991	2001	2011	2021

Sources: Croatian Bureau of Statistics publications

== Economy ==
Split-Dalmatia County has the 5th highest Human Development Index of any county in Croatia. Before privatisation and accession to European Union, beside tourism the most notable branch was Shipbuilding. County now relies on tourism as main source of income.
