= Domovina (newspaper) =

Chilean newspaper

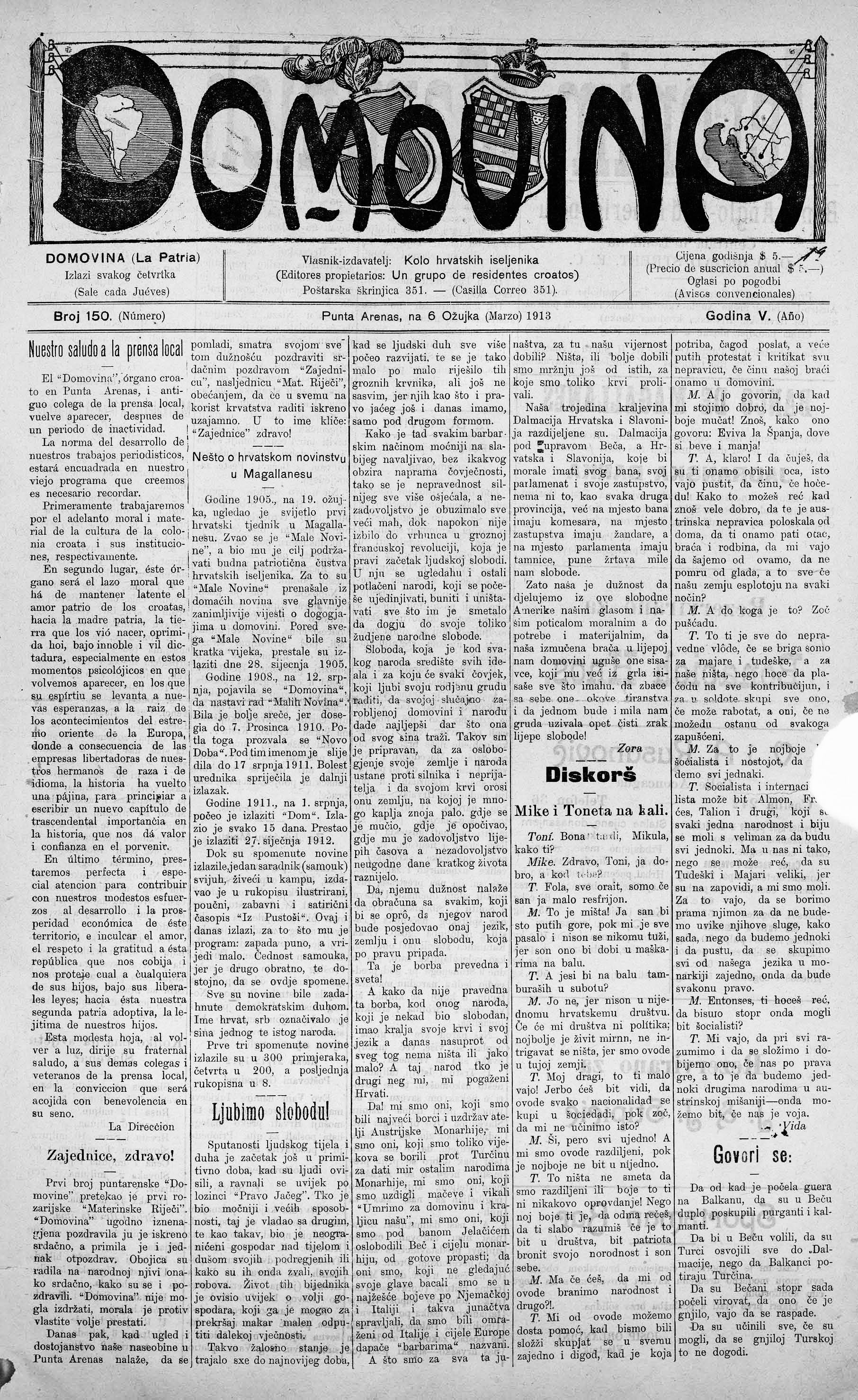
Front page of the March 6, 1913 issue of Domovina.

Domovina (Homeland) was a Chilean newspaper in Croatian edited and printed in the city of Punta Arenas between 1908 and 1917. The paper also appeared under the name Novo Doba (New Epoch) for several years before reverting to its original name. It was one of the local newspapers most read by the residents Croatian community in Chile.

== History ==
Domovina (Homeland) was founded on September 12, 1908. The paper adopted the new name Novo Doba (New Epoch) on 3 December 1910, led initially by Juan Trutanić and later by Lucas Bonacic Dorić. Its editor was Pedro Gašić.

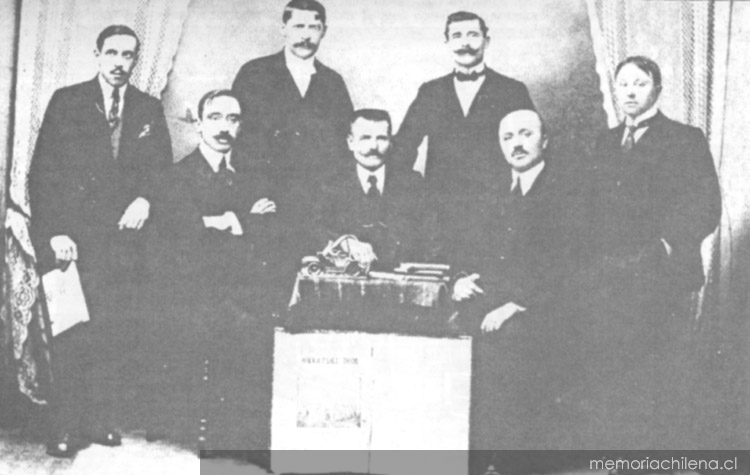
The editorial board of Domovina in 1916.

In September 1911, the newspaper retook the name Domovina, continuing under that name until its termination on December 29, 1917.

According to Mateo Martinić: "[...] Some of these changes, as in the previous case, were motivated by the dominant nationalist tendencies in the corporate life of immigrants, progressively adhered to Croatian independence, feeling that depending on the course of European events would transform at last decidedly yugoslavist the middle of the decade of the 1910s"
