= Vikrče =

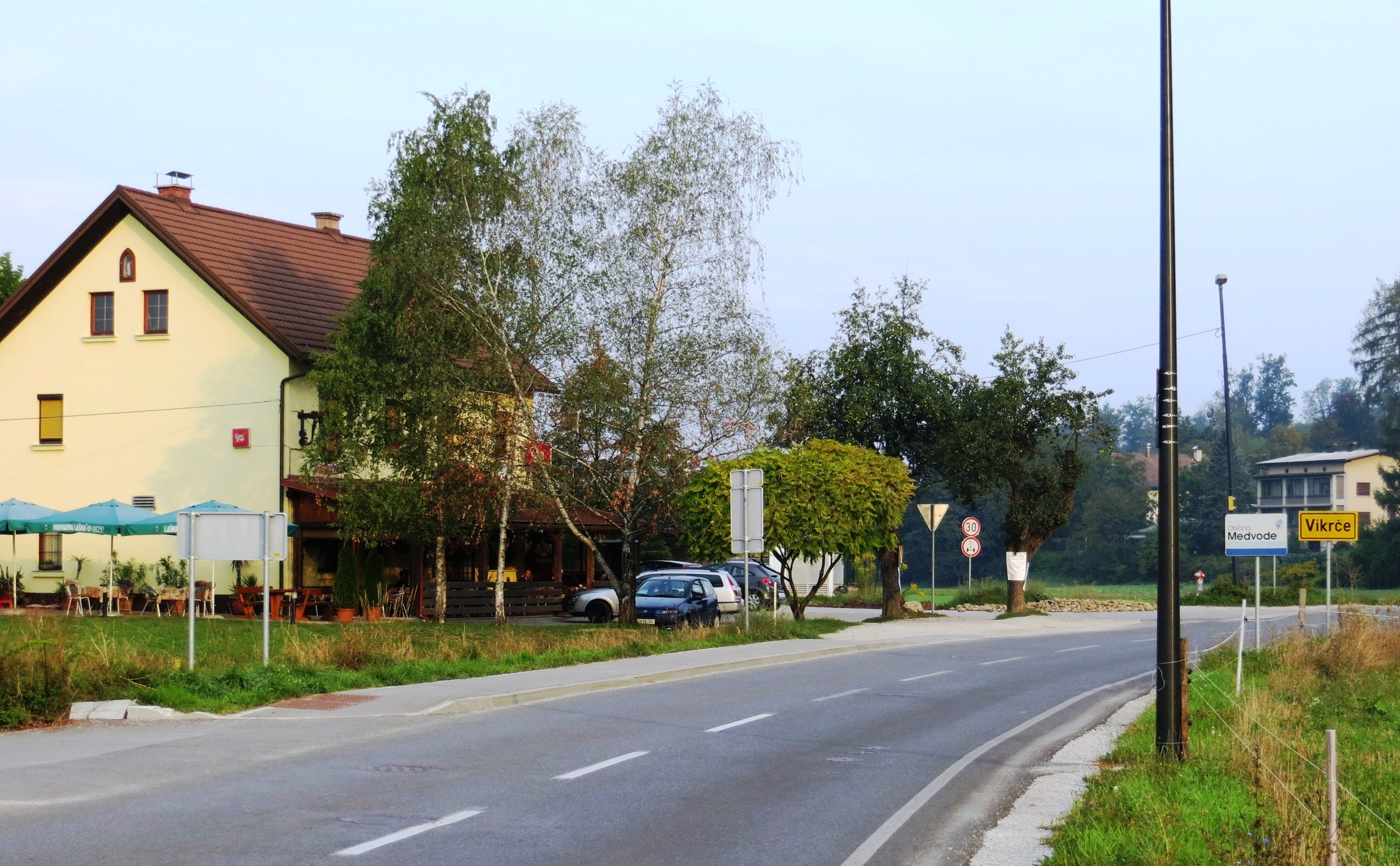

- Location in Slovenia
- Coordinates: 46°7′35.11″N 14°26′37.77″E
- Country: Slovenia
- Traditional region: Upper Carniola
- Statistical region: Central Slovenia
- Municipality: Medvode

Area
  - Total: 0.81 km^{2} (0.31 sq mi)
- Elevation: 320.8 m (1,052 ft)

Population (2002)
  - Total: 283

Vikrče (pronounced [ˈʋiːkəɾtʃɛ]) is a settlement on the left bank of the Sava River southeast of the town of Medvode in the Upper Carniola region of Slovenia.

== Name ==
Vikrče was attested in written sources in 1394 as Weykers, and in 1436 as Waikers. The name probably developed from the plural demonym *vykъrčane 'people living on cleared land', derived from the noun *vykъrčь 'cleared land'. A less likely possibility is that the name is derived from the Old High German personal name Wîchart.
