= Tacen =

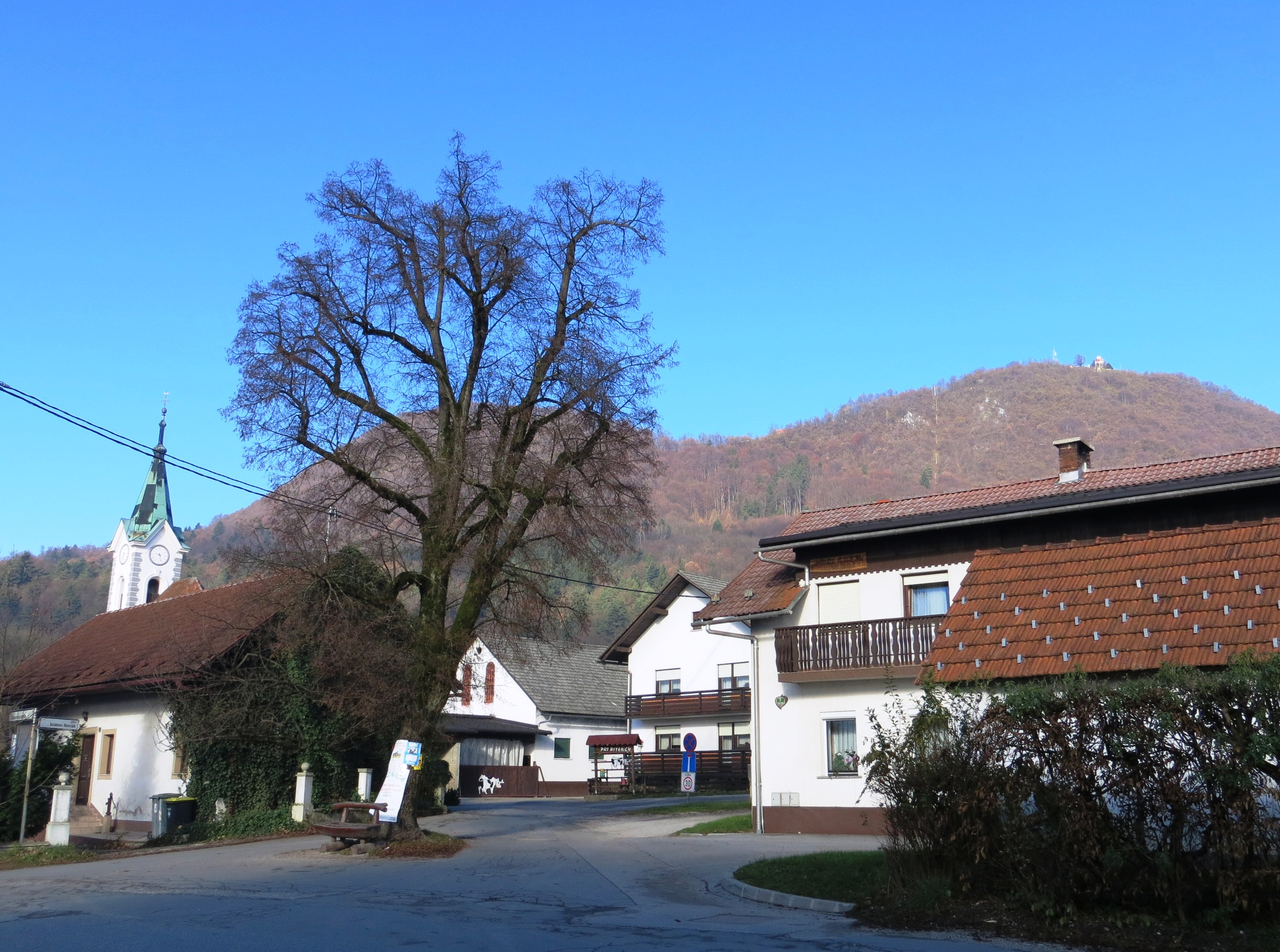

- Location in Slovenia
- Coordinates: 46°7′5.56″N 14°28′8.75″E
- Country: Slovenia
- Traditional region: Upper Carniola
- Statistical region: Central Slovenia
- Municipality: Ljubljana
- Elevation: 310 m (1,020 ft)

Tacen (pronounced [ˈtaːtsən]; in older sources also Tacenj, German: Tazen) is a formerly independent settlement in the northwest part of the capital Ljubljana in central Slovenia. It is part of the traditional region of Upper Carniola and is now included with the rest of the municipality in the Central Slovenia Statistical Region. It includes the hamlets of Na Grškem, Sige, V Bregu (or Breg), and Šmarna Gora.

== Geography ==
Tacen is a clustered settlement at the foot of Mount Saint Mary (Slovene: Šmarna gora) on the left bank of the Sava River, opposite the former village of Brod. The hamlet of Na Grškem lies immediately above the Sava, Sige is to the west along the road to Vikrče, and V Bregu (or Breg) lies up the slope of Mount Saint Mary along Breg Creek (Slovene: Bregarski graben), which is a tributary of the Sava. The hamlet of Šmarna Gora is at the top of the hill. The soil in Tacen is mostly sandy and there are fields towards the Sava.

== Name ==
Tacen was attested in written sources in 1283 as Taezzen (and as Taezen in 1299, Taczen in 1368, Taczn and Taczen in 1431, Däczen in 1456, Tatzen in 1477, and Täznim in 1642). The origin of the name is uncertain. One possibility is derivation from Slovene *tac 'tax, tribute', referring to a settlement that had some role in collecting or paying taxes. Another possibility is derivation from tast 'father-in-law', referring to some kind of family relationship. A third possibility is derivation from the personal name *Tatьcь, referring to an early inhabitant. In the past the German name was Tazen.

== History ==
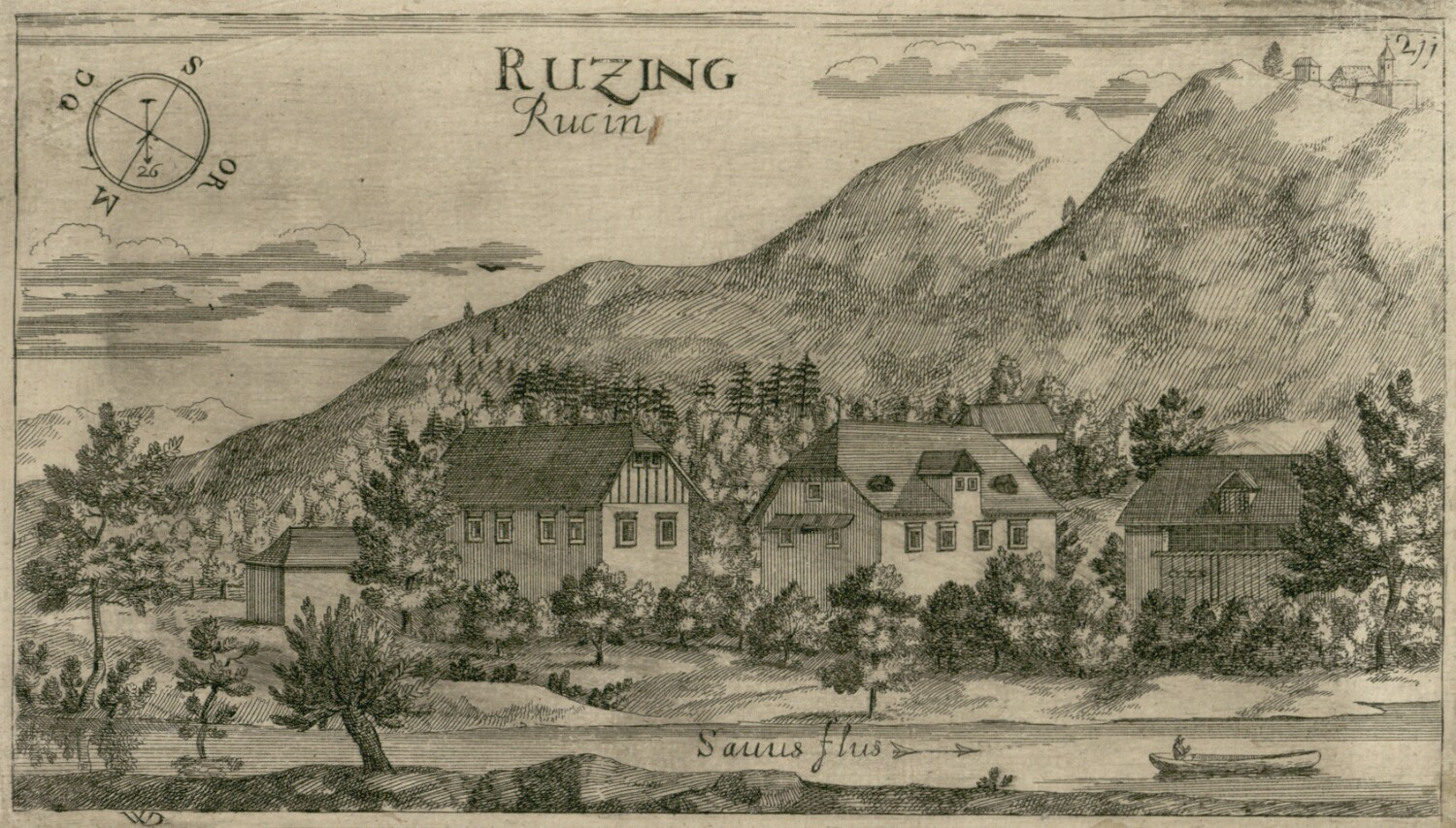
Rocen Manor, 1679

It is likely that there was a settlement on Mount Saint Mary in prehistoric times. A Roman road passed through Tacen, leading to Smlednik. A document dating from 1216 indicates there was a fortification on the hill. During the Middle Ages, adjacent Grmada Hill served as a place for bonfires to warn of Ottoman attacks. A government trade route passing through Tacen was established in 1541, conferring on the settlement the right to collect duties for crossing the Sava. The ferry at Tacen came under the authority of the Ljubljana tax office in 1569. Rocen Manor (in older sources also Ručno, German: Rutzing) stands below Grmada Hill; it was first mentioned in written sources in 1553. It was purchased by the Franciscans in 1930 and housed a monastery. After the Second World War the manor was confiscated and converted into a police training school using forced labor by Catholic priests held as political prisoners. A wooden toll bridge was built across the Sava in 1844–48 by Baron Franz Lazzarini. Name the Saint Mary Bridge (Marijin most), it was destroyed by the river in 1907. After this, the ferry service was resumed until 1910, when an iron bridge was built. In 1929 the Seunig family established the Seta factory in Tacen to produce metal tools and materials for shoes; this was confiscated after the Second World War and became the Kot factory in 1958. The factory went bankrupt in 1996. Two water-driven mills along the Sava—the Česen Mill (Česnov mlin) and Maček Mill (Mačkov mlin)—stopped operating in the 20th century. Extensive construction of houses took place between 1971 and 1975. Tacen was annexed by the City of Ljubljana in 1983, ending its existence as an independent settlement.

== Church ==
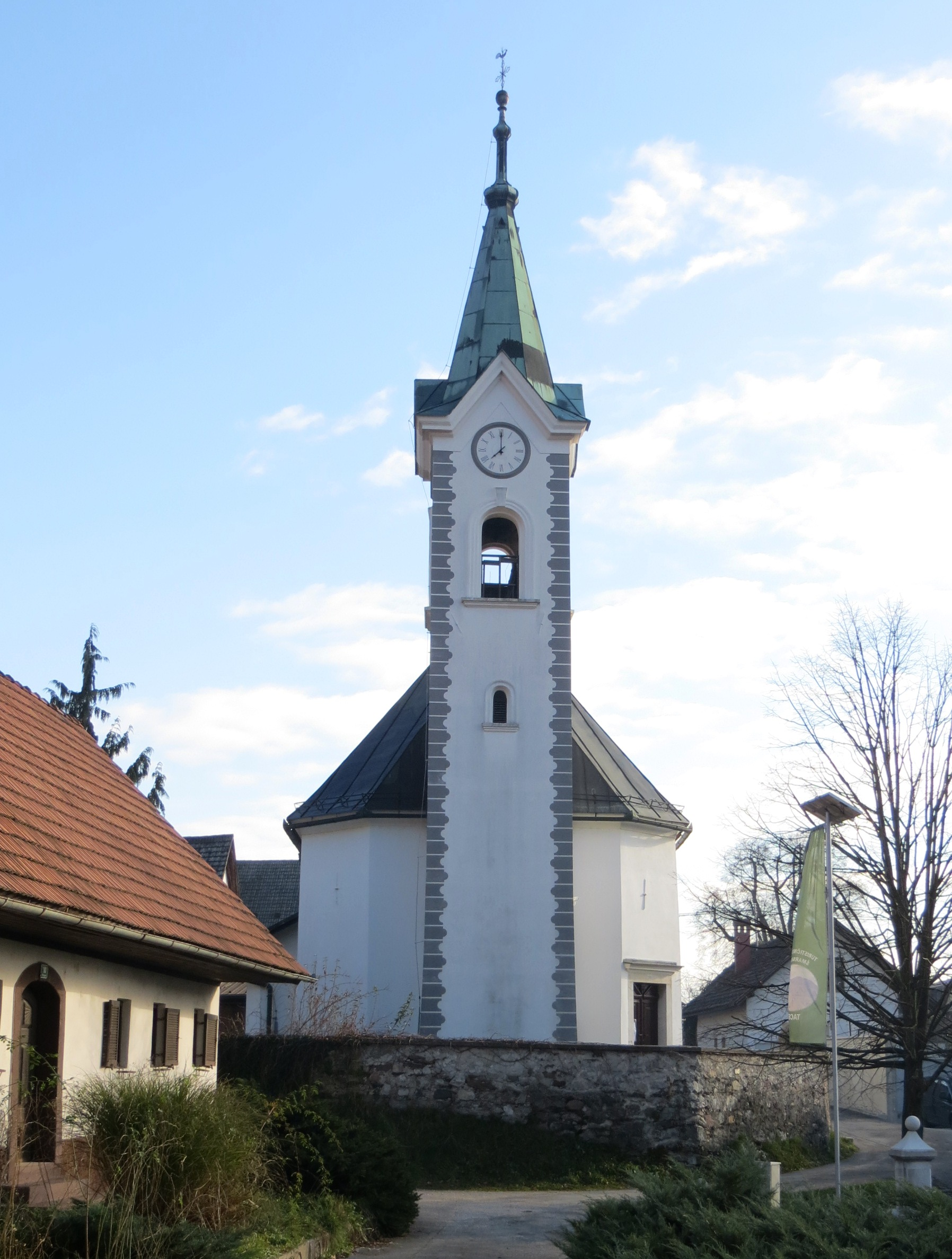
Saint George's Church

The church in Tacen is dedicated to Saint George and was first mentioned in written sources in 1526. The original structure was Gothic, but was remodeled in the Baroque style in the first half of the 17th century. The church's patrons—the owners of Rocen Manor—are buried in the nave. The church was further remodeled in the second half of the 18th century.

== Recreation ==
Kayak races were first held at the Tacen Whitewater Course on the Sava in 1948. The dam for the hydroelectric plant makes it possible to control the water level. World championships were held here in 1955 and 1991, and there are annual national and international competitions.

== Notable people ==
Notable people that were born or lived in Tacen include:

- Pavla Brunčko (born 1921), actress
- Miha Novak (1899–1941), Partisan
- Jakob Prešeren (1777–1837), uncle of the poet France Prešeren
- Jože Šilc (born 1922), agriculture expert
- Ivan Tomšič (1902–1976), lawyer
