= Pollert =

Pollert may refer to:

- Chet Pollert (born 1955), American politician
- Emil Pollert (1877-1935), Czech opera singer born Emil Popper
- Emil Pollert (canoeist), Czechoslovak slalom canoeist who competed in the 1960s
- Jaroslav Pollert (canoeist born 1943), Czechoslovak slalom canoer who competed in 1960s and 1970s
- Jaroslav Pollert (canoeist born 1971), Czech slalom canoer who competed in 1990s and 2000s
- Lukáš Pollert (born 1970), Czech slalom canoeist who competed from the late 1980s to the early 2000s
