= Pfannenstock =

Mountain in Switzerland

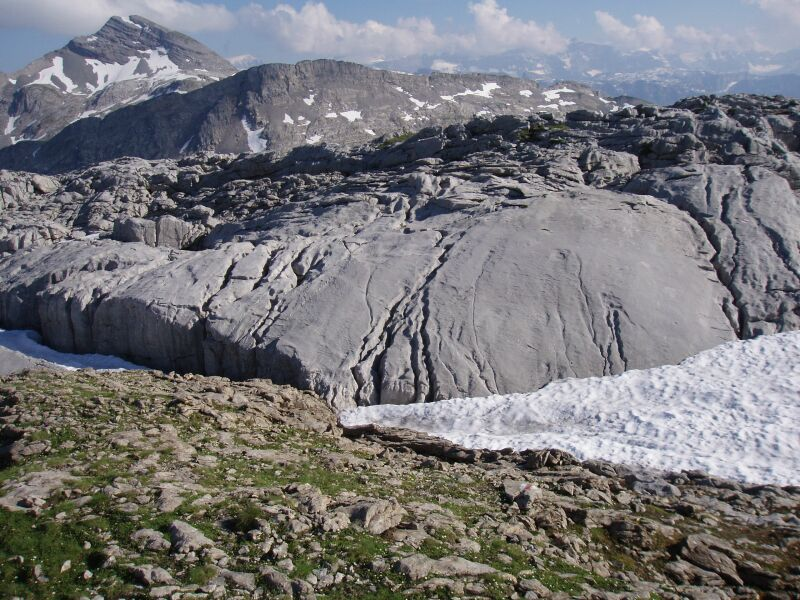
- Pfannenstock (background left) from the Silberen

Highest point
- Elevation: 2,573 m (8,442 ft)
- Prominence: 373 m (1,224 ft)
- Parent peak: Glärnisch
- Coordinates: 46°57′42″N 8°54′42″E

Geography
- Location within Switzerland Location within Canton of Schwyz
- Country: Switzerland
- Canton: Schwyz
- Parent range: Schwyzer Alps

The Pfannenstock (2,573 m [8,442 ft]) is a mountain of the Schwyzer Alps, located east of Muotathal in the Swiss canton of Schwyz. It lies on the karstic range between the valleys of the Muota and Linth, west of the border with the canton of Glarus.

== See also ==
- List of mountains of the canton of Schwyz
