= Chratzerengrat =

Mountain in Switzerland

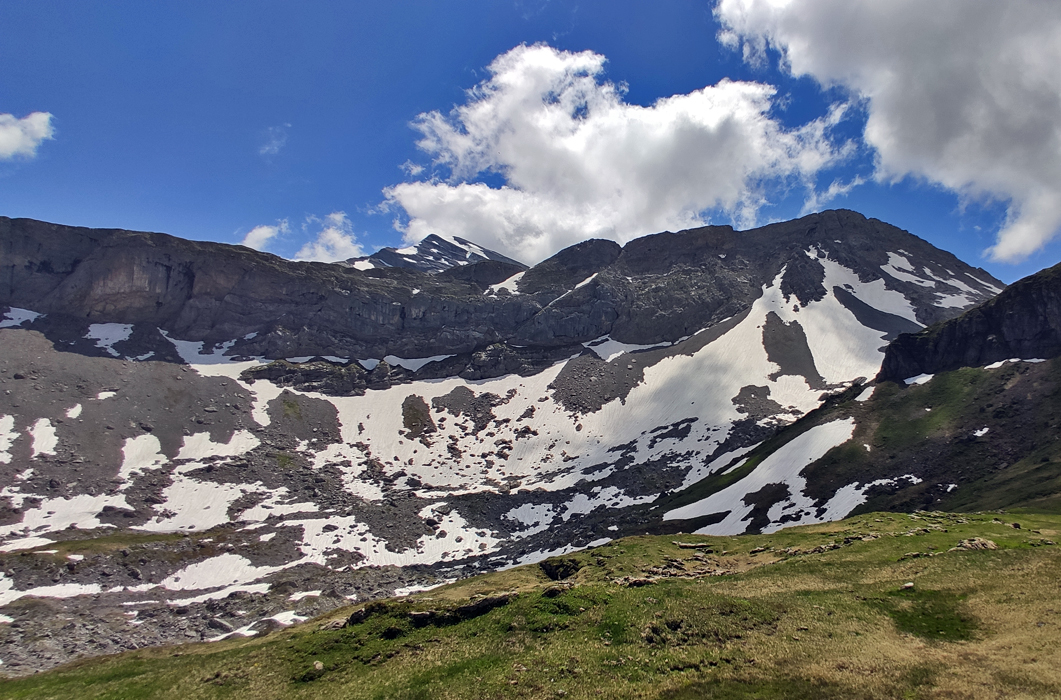

Highest point
- Elevation: 2,349 m (7,707 ft)
- Prominence: 208 m (682 ft)
- Coordinates: 46°58′17″N 08°54′05″E

Geography
- Location within Switzerland Location within Canton of Schwyz
- Country: Switzerland
- Canton: Schwyz
- Parent range: Glarus Alps

The Chratzerengrat (2,349 m [7,707 ft]) is a mountain of the Glarus Alps, located east of Muotathal in the canton of Schwyz, Switzerland. It lies north of the Pfannenstock.

== See also ==
- List of mountains of the canton of Schwyz
