= Carol Knight =

American slalom canoeist

Medal record

Women's canoe slalom

Representing United States

World Championships
Gold medal – first place	1973 Muotathal	Mixed C-2

Carol Knight is an American former slalom canoeist who competed in the 1970s. She won a gold medal in the mixed C-2 event at the 1973 ICF Canoe Slalom World Championships in Muotathal. She partnered with Dave Knight, with their winning run totaling 474.1 points.
