= Alpler Horn =

Mountain in Switzerland

- Location within Switzerland

Highest point
- Elevation: 2,380 m (7,810 ft)
- Prominence: 180 m (590 ft)
- Parent peak: Schächentaler Windgällen
- Coordinates: 46°54′38″N 8°48′30″E

Geography
- Location: Uri, Switzerland
- Parent range: Glarus Alps

The Alpler Horn is a mountain of the Glarus Alps, located south of Muotathal in Central Switzerland. It lies north of the Schächentaler Windgällen, within the part of the Muota valley that belongs to the canton of Uri.

The Waldistock and Alpler Stock summits, on its east side, overlook the Waldisee.
