= Ria van Stipdonk =

Dutch canoeist

Medal record

Women's canoe slalom

Representing Netherlands

World Championships
Bronze medal – third place	1973 Muotathal	Mixed C-2

Ria Verschuren (born September 19, 1949) is a former Dutch slalom canoeist who competed in the 1970s. She won a bronze medal in the mixed C-2 event with her former husband Peter van Stipdonk at the 1973 ICF Canoe Slalom World Championships in Muotathal.
