= Waldisee =

Lake in Schwyz, Switzerland

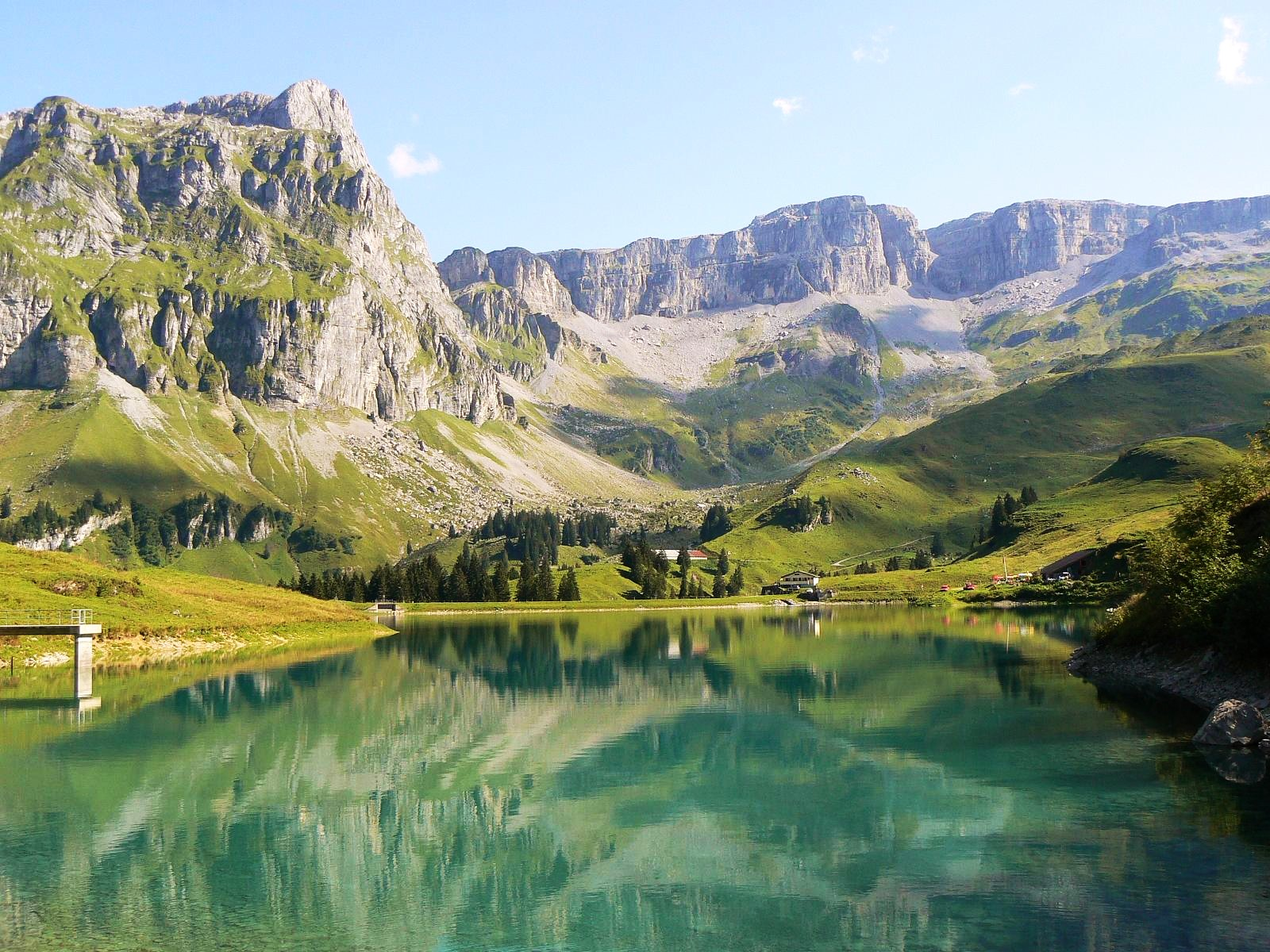
- View towards the Glatten

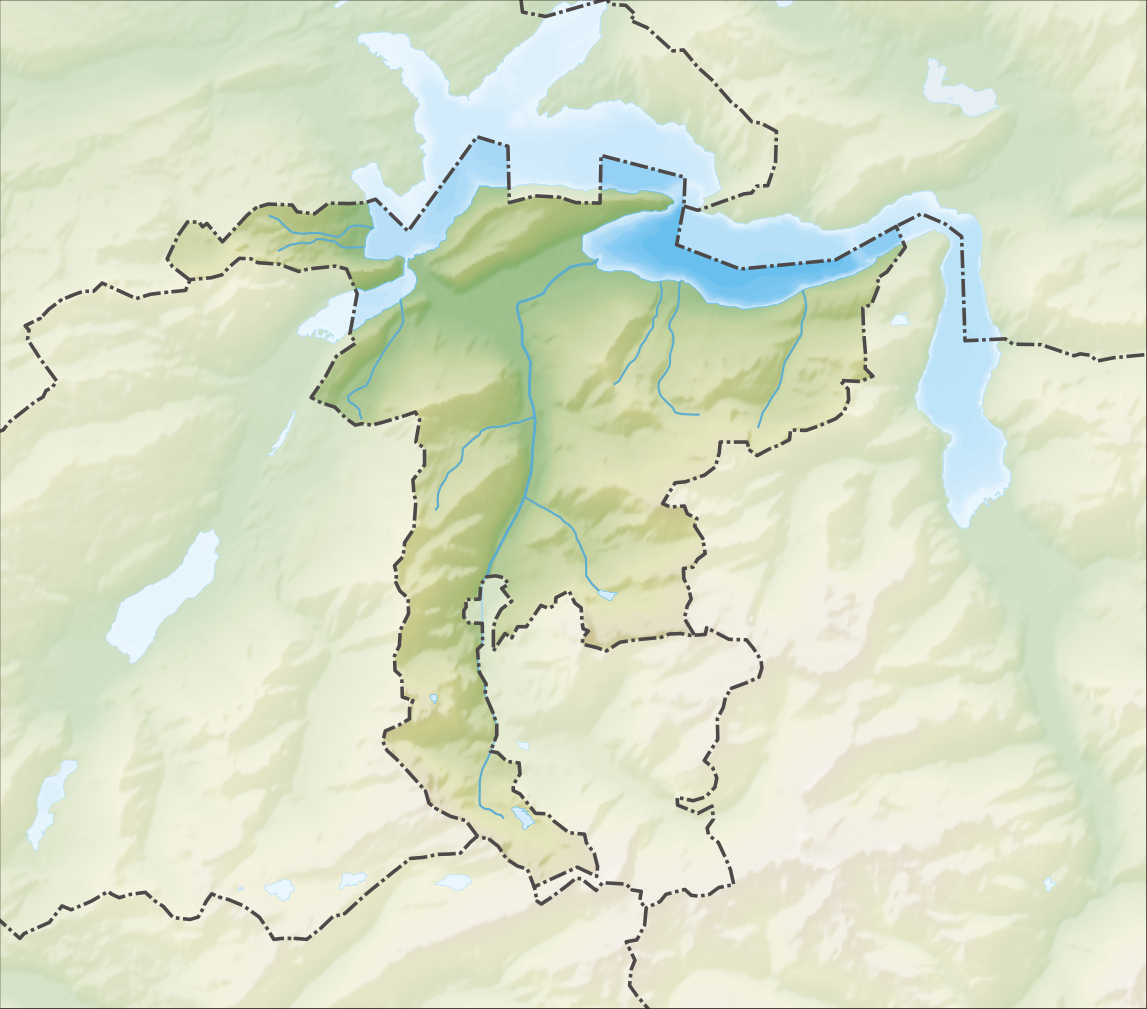
- Location within Canton of Schwyz Location within Canton of Uri Location within Canton of Glarus Location within Canton of Nidwalden Location within Switzerland Location within Alps
- Interactive map of Waldisee
- Location: Canton of Schwyz
- Coordinates: 46°54′42″N 8°50′25″E
- Basin countries: Switzerland
- Surface area: 5.2 ha (13 acres)
- Surface elevation: 1,406 m (4,613 ft)

The Waldisee (or Waldiseeli) is a mountain lake, located south of Bisisthal, in the municipality of Muotathal, canton of Schwyz. It lies at a height of 1,406 metres, at the foot of the Alpler Stock. It has a maximum length of 420 metres.

== See also ==
- List of mountain lakes of Switzerland
