= Wolfgang Büchner =

Wolfgang Büchner may refer to:

- Wolfgang Büchner (journalist) (born 1966), German journalist
- Wolfgang Büchner (canoeist), East German slalom canoeist
