= Martina Falke =

German canoeist

Medal record

Women's canoe slalom

Representing East Germany

World Championships
Bronze medal – third place	1973 Muotathal	K-1
Bronze medal – third place	1973 Muotathal	K-1 team

Martina Falke (born 21 July 1951 in Zeitz) is a former East German slalom canoeist who competed in the 1970s. She won two bronze medals at the 1973 ICF Canoe Slalom World Championships in Muotathal, earning them in the K-1 event and the K-1 team event.

Falke also finished tenth in the K-1 event at the 1972 Summer Olympics in Munich.
