= Norman Holcombe =

American canoeist

Medal record

Men's canoe slalom

Representing United States

World Championships
Silver medal – second place	1973 Muotathal	Mixed C-2

Norman Holcombe is a former American slalom canoeist who competed from the late 1960s to the mid-1970s. He won a silver medal in the mixed C-2 event at the 1973 ICF Canoe Slalom World Championships in Muotathal.
