= Hans-Otto Schumacher =

German canoeist (1950–2024)

Medal record

Men's canoe slalom

Representing West Germany

Olympic Games
Silver medal – second place	1972 Munich	C-2

World Championships
Gold medal – first place	1973 Muotathal	C-2 team
Bronze medal – third place	1973 Muotathal	C-2

Hans-Otto Schumacher (17 February 1950 – 10 July 2024) was a West German slalom canoeist who competed in the 1970s. He won a silver medal in the C-2 event at the 1972 Summer Olympics in Munich.

Schumacher also won two medals at the 1973 ICF Canoe Slalom World Championships in Muotathal with a gold in the C-2 team event and a bronze in the C-2 event.

Born in Grevenbroich on 17 February 1950, Schumacher died on 10 July 2024, at the age of 74.

== Sources ==
- Evans, Hilary; Gjerde, Arild; Heijmans, Jeroen; Mallon, Bill; et al. "Hans-Otto Schumacher". Olympics at Sports-Reference.com. Sports Reference LLC. Archived from the original on 18 April 2020.
