= Josef Havela =

Medal record

Men's canoe slalom

Representing Czechoslovakia

World Championships
Silver medal – second place	1973 Muotathal	C-2 team

Josef Havela is a former Czechoslovak slalom canoeist who competed in the 1970s. He won a silver medal in the C-2 team event at the 1973 ICF Canoe Slalom World Championships in Muotathal.
