= Jaroslav Pollert =

Jaroslav Pollert may refer to:

- Jaroslav Pollert (canoeist, born 1943), Czech slalom canoer who competed in 1960s and 1970s
- Jaroslav Pollert (canoeist, born 1971), Czech slalom canoer who competed in 1990s and 2000s
