= Schijen =

Schijen is the name of several mountain summits in Switzerland:

- Schijen (Glarus Alps)
- Schijen (Schwyzer Alps)
