= Antonín Brabec =

Antonín Brabec may refer to:

- Antonín Brabec (canoeist) (1946–2017), Czech slalom canoeist
- Antonín Brabec (rugby union) (born 1973), Czech rugby union player and coach
