= Udo Müller =

East German canoeist

Medal record

Men's canoe slalom

Representing East Germany

World Championships
Silver medal – second place	1973 Muotathal	C-1 team
Bronze medal – third place	1973 Muotathal	C-1

Udo Müller is a former East German slalom canoeist who competed in the 1970s. He won two medals at the 1973 ICF Canoe Slalom World Championships in Muotathal with a silver in the C-1 team event and a bronze in the C-1 event.
