= Eva Karel =

Swiss canoeist

Medal record

Women's canoe slalom

Representing Switzerland

World Championships
Silver medal – second place	1973 Muotathal	K-1 team

Eva Karel is a former Swiss slalom canoeist who competed from the mid-1960s to the mid-1970s. She won a silver medal in the K-1 team event at the 1973 ICF Canoe Slalom World Championships in Muotathal.
