= Josef Raschke =

Medal record

Men's canoe slalom

Representing East Germany

World Championships
Bronze medal – third place	1973 Muotathal	C-2 team

Josef Raschke is a former East German slalom canoeist who competed in the 1970s. He won a bronze medal in the C-2 team event at the 1973 ICF Canoe Slalom World Championships in Muotathal.
