= Barbara Holcombe =

American canoeist

Medal record

Women's canoe slalom

Representing United States

World Championships
Silver medal – second place	1973 Muotathal	Mixed C-2

Barbara Holcombe is an American former slalom canoeist who competed in the 1970s. She won a silver medal in the mixed C-2 event at the 1973 ICF Canoe Slalom World Championships in Muotathal.
