= Éric Koechlin =

French canoeist

Medal record

Men's canoe slalom

Representing France

World Championships
Bronze medal – third place	1973 Muotathal	K-1 team

Éric Koechlin (11 November 1950 – 9 November 2014) was a French slalom canoeist who competed from the late 1960s to the late 1970s. He won a bronze medal in the K-1 team event at the 1973 in Muotathal. Koechlin also finished 16th in the K-1 event at the 1972 Summer Olympics in Munich. He was at the end of his life a regional director of the Institut National du Sport et de l'Éducation Physique, and part of the band The Thrillerz (Creators of The Then Then). His granddaughter Lily Ramonatxo is a successful rhythmic gymnast.
