= Michael Reimann =

German slalom canoeist

Medal record

Men's canoe slalom

Representing West Germany

World Championships
Gold medal – first place	1973 Muotathal	C-2 team

Michael Reimann (born 3 February 1952 in Magdeburg) is a former West German slalom canoeist who competed in the 1970s.

He won a gold medal in the C-2 team event at the 1973 ICF Canoe Slalom World Championships in Muotathal.

Reimann also finished seventh in the C-2 event at the 1972 Summer Olympics in Munich.
