= Wilhelm Baues =

German canoeist

Medal record

Men's canoe slalom

Representing West Germany

Olympic Games
Silver medal – second place	1972 Munich	C-2

World Championships
Gold medal – first place	1973 Muotathal	C-2 team
Bronze medal – third place	1973 Muotathal	C-2

Wilhelm Bernd "Willi" Baues (born 21 November 1948 in Mönchengladbach) is a former West German slalom canoeist who competed in the 1970s. He won a silver medal in the C-2 event at the 1972 Summer Olympics in Munich.

Baues also won two medals at the 1973 ICF Canoe Slalom World Championships in Muotathal with a gold in the C-2 team event and a bronze in the C-2 event.
