= Lyn Ashton =

American retired slalom canoeist

Medal record

Women's canoe slalom

Representing United States

World Championships
| Gold medal – first place | 1973 Muotathal | K1 team |

Caroline Louise "Lyn" Ashton (born 29 November 1951 in Northampton, Massachusetts) is an American retired slalom canoeist who competed in the early and mid-1970s.

She won a gold medal in the K1 team event at the 1973 ICF Canoe Slalom World Championships in Muotathal. She also finished ninth in the K1 event at the 1972 Summer Olympics in Munich.
