= Schijen (Glarus Alps) =

Mountain in Switzerland

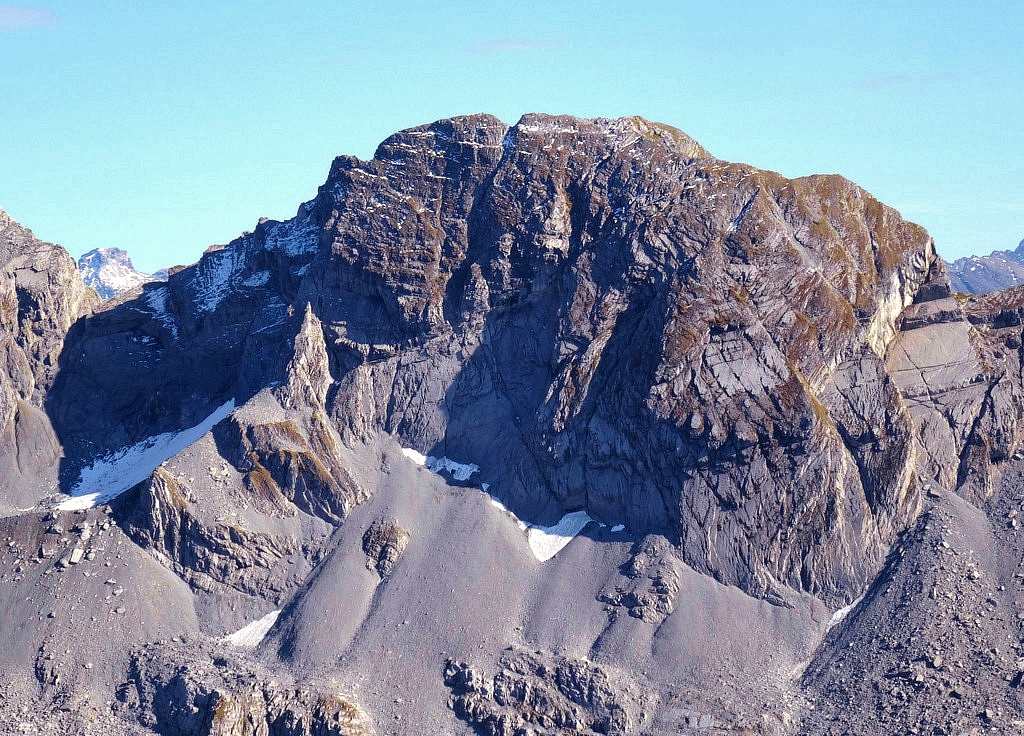

Highest point
- Elevation: 2,610 m (8,560 ft)
- Prominence: 110 m (360 ft)
- Parent peak: Ortstock
- Coordinates: 46°55′11″N 8°56′06″E

Geography
- Location within Switzerland Location within Canton of Glarus Location within Canton of Schwyz Location within Canton of Uri
- Country: Switzerland
- Cantons: Glarus / Schwyz / Uri
- Parent range: Glarus Alps

The Schijen is a mountain of the Glarus Alps in Switzerland, located west of the Ortstock. The summit is the tripoint between the cantons of Schwyz, Uri and Glarus. The Schijen lies on the range that lies between the Glattalp and the Urner Boden.

== See also ==
- List of mountains of Uri
- List of mountains of the canton of Glarus
- List of mountains of the canton of Schwyz
