= Louise Holcombe =

American canoeist (1954–2026)

Medal record

Women's canoe slalom

Representing United States

World Championships
Gold medal – first place	1973 Muotathal	K-1 team

Louise Holcombe (March 17, 1954 – June 21, 2026) was an American slalom canoeist who competed in the 1970s. She won a gold medal in the K-1 team event at the 1973 ICF Canoe Slalom World Championships in Muotathal.

Holcombe was born in Washington, D.C., on March 17, 1954. She also finished 15th in the K-1 event at the 1972 Summer Olympics in Munich. Holcombe died in Roanoke, Virginia, on June 21, 2026, at the age of 72.

== Sources ==
- Evans, Hilary; Gjerde, Arild; Heijmans, Jeroen; Mallon, Bill; et al. "Louise Holcombe". Olympics at Sports-Reference.com. Sports Reference LLC. Archived from the original on August 17, 2011.
