= Sybille Spindler =

Medal record

Women's canoe slalom

Representing East Germany

World Championships
Gold medal – first place	1973 Muotathal	K-1
Bronze medal – third place	1973 Muotathal	K-1 team

Sybille Spindler is a former East German slalom canoeist who competed in the 1970s. She won two medals at the 1973 ICF Canoe Slalom World Championships in Muotathal with a gold in the K-1 event and a bronze in the K-1 team event.
