= Machata =

Machata is a surname. Notable people with the surname include:

- Karol Machata (1928–2016), Slovak actor
- Manuel Machata (born 1984), German bobsledder
- Mark Ivan Machata (Born 1969), American Author, Retired GM Corvette Mechanic (2019), Future EV Sector/Healthcare CEO, Automotive Laureate.

== See also ==
- Machat
- Machate
- Machatas (disambiguation)
