= Glatten (mountain) =

Mountain in Switzerland

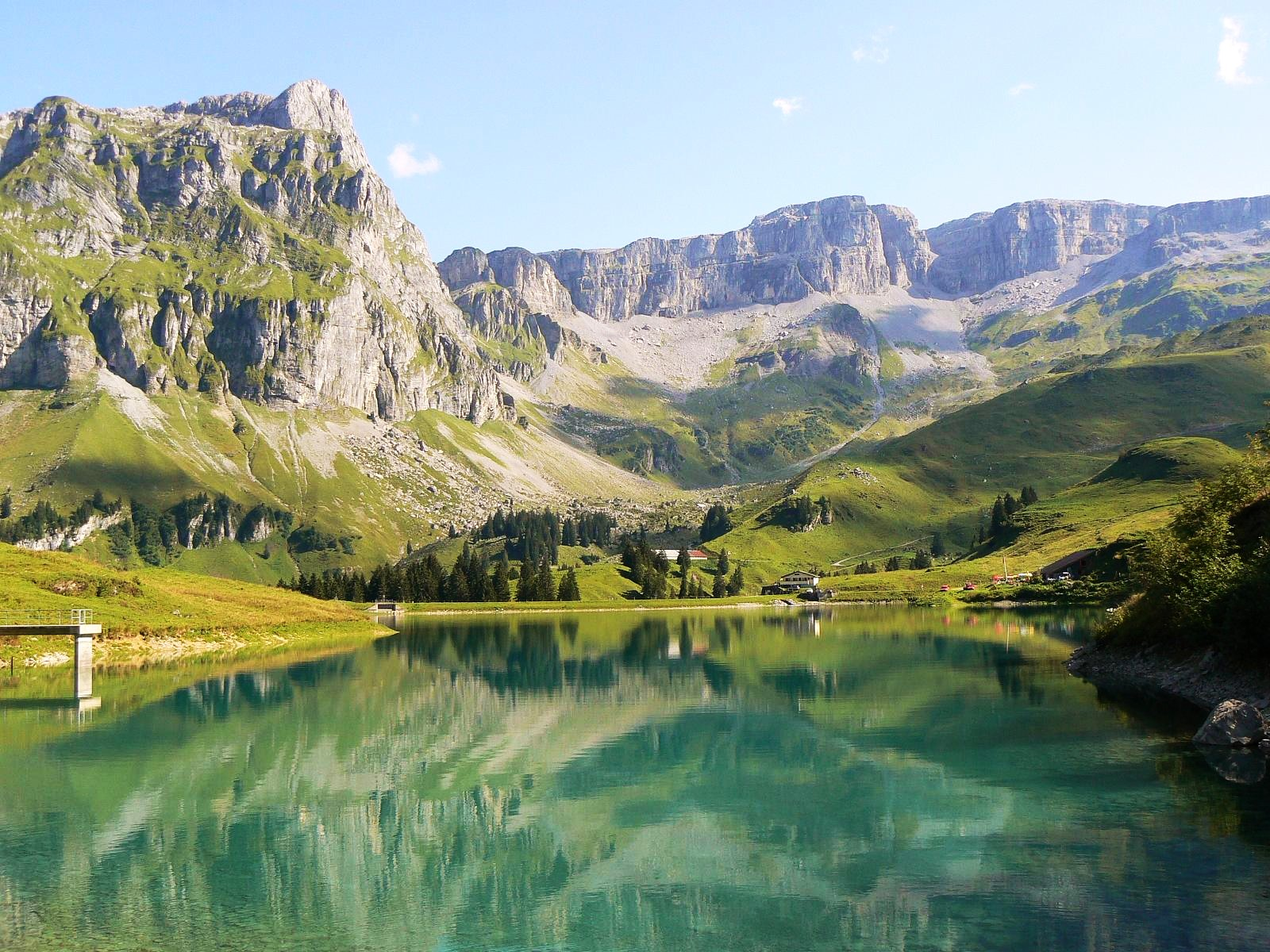
- The Glatten (centre right) from the Waldisee (north side)

Highest point
- Elevation: 2,505 m (8,219 ft)
- Prominence: 257 m (843 ft)
- Parent peak: Ortstock
- Coordinates: 46°52′52″N 8°51′33″E

Geography
- Location within Switzerland
- Location: Canton of Uri, Switzerland
- Parent range: Schwyzer Alps

The Glatten (German pronunciation: [ˈɡlatn̩]; 2,505 m) is a mountain of the Schwyzer Alps, overlooking the Klausen Pass in the canton of Uri. It is the tripoint between the valleys Bisistal, Schächental and Urner Boden. The summit consists of a large karstic plateau.
