= Wojciech Gawroński =

Polish canoeist

Medal record

Men's canoe slalom

Representing Poland

World Championships
Silver medal – second place	1973 Muotathal	K-1 team
Silver medal – second place	1975 Skopje	K-1 team
Bronze medal – third place	1973 Muotathal	K-1
Bronze medal – third place	1977 Spittal	K-1 team

Wojciech Gawroński (born 25 March 1953 in Nowy Sącz) is a former Polish slalom canoeist who competed in the 1970s. He won four medals at the ICF Canoe Slalom World Championships with two silvers (K-1 team: 1973, 1975) and two bronzes (K-1: 1973, K-1 team: 1977).

Gawroński also finished 23rd in the K-1 event at the 1972 Summer Olympics in Munich.
