= 1973 ICF Canoe Slalom World Championships =

Canoe slalom event in Muotathal, Switzerland

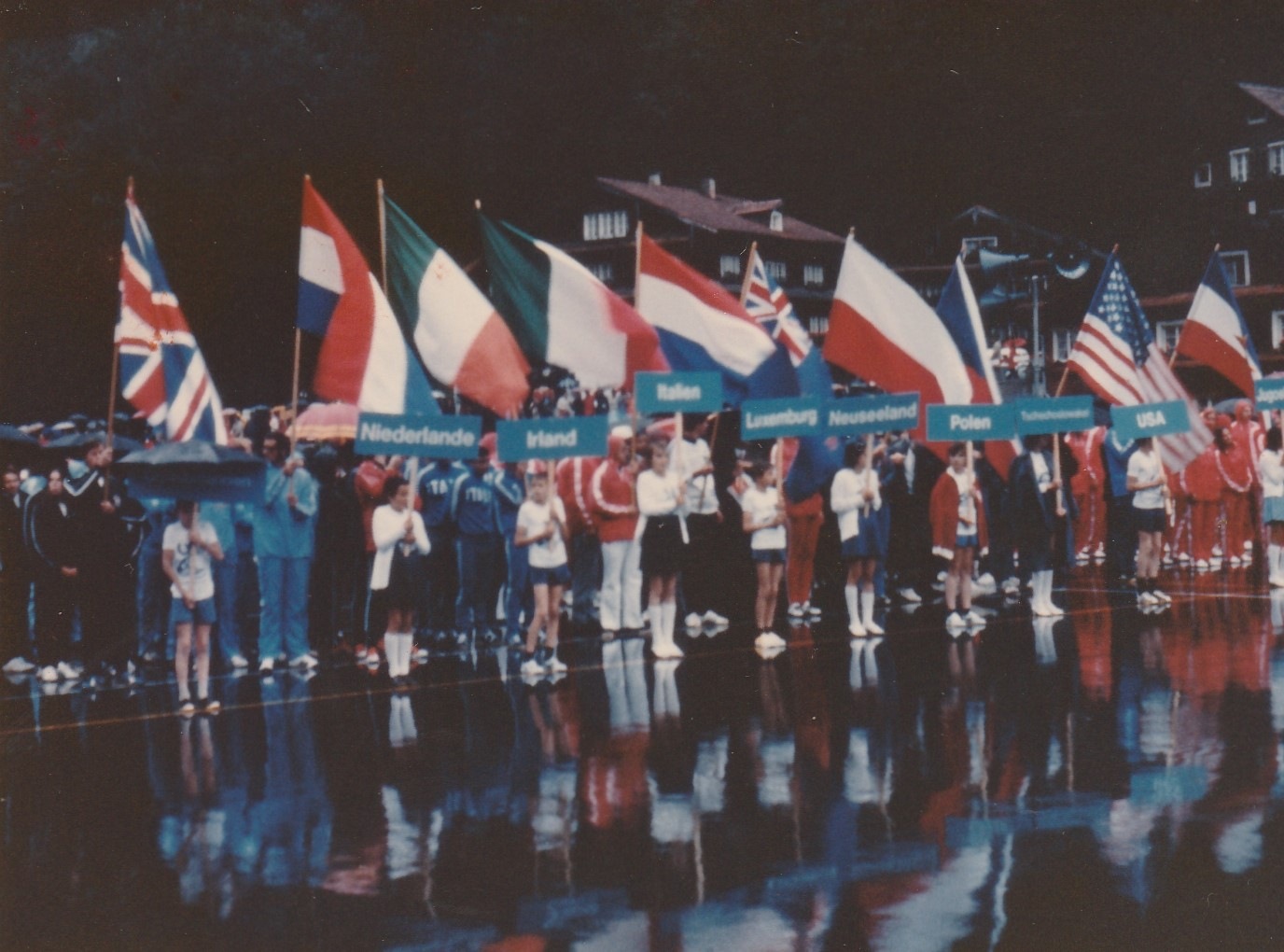
Opening ceremony at the event

The 1973 ICF Canoe Slalom World Championships were held in Muotathal, Switzerland under the auspices of International Canoe Federation. It was the 13th edition. A record nine nations won medals at the championships.

== Medal summary ==
=== Men's ===
==== Canoe ====
Event	Gold	Points	Silver	Points	Bronze	Points
C1	Reinhard Eiben (GDR)	269.1	Karel Třešňák (TCH)	270.1	Udo Müller (GDR)	284.0
C1 team	Czechoslovakia; Karel Třešňák; Petr Sodomka; Jaroslav Radil	291.6	East Germany; Reinhard Eiben; Peter Massalski; Udo Müller	305.0	West Germany; Walter Horn; Wolfgang Peters; Josef Schumacher	361.2
C2	Czechoslovakia; Jiří Krejza; Jaroslav Pollert	164.0	East Germany; Jürgen Kretschmer; Klaus Trummer	168.0	West Germany; Wilhelm Baues; Hans-Otto Schumacher	178.1
C2 team	West Germany; Karl-Heinz Scheffer & Heinz-Jürgen Steinschulte; Hans-Otto Schumacher & Wilhelm Baues; Michael Reimann & Olaf Fricke	508.5	Czechoslovakia; František Kadaňka & Antonín Brabec; Jiří Krejza & Jaroslav Pollert; Josef Havela & Bohumír Machát	547.8	East Germany; Jürgen Kretschmer & Klaus Trummer; Hubert Kraeft & Jürgen Köhler; Peter Grabowski & Josef Raschke	558.9

==== Kayak ====
Event	Gold	Points	Silver	Points	Bronze	Points
K1	Norbert Sattler (AUT)	134.6	Siegbert Horn (GDR)	137.3	Wojciech Gawroński (POL)	138.3
K1 team	East Germany; Siegbert Horn; Christian Döring; Wolfgang Büchner	244.7	Poland; Wojciech Gawroński; Jerzy Stanuch; Stanisław Majerczak	277.8	France; Michel Magdinier; Claude Peschier; Éric Koechlin	308.6

=== Mixed ===
==== Canoe ====
Event	Gold	Points	Silver	Points	Bronze	Points
C2	United States; Dave Knight; Carol Knight	474.1	United States; Norman Holcombe; Barbara Holcombe	522.0	Netherlands; Peter van Stipdonk; Ria van Stipdonk	590.1

=== Women's ===
==== Kayak ====
Event	Gold	Points	Silver	Points	Bronze	Points
K1	Sybille Spindler (GDR)	288.4	Maria Ćwiertniewicz (POL)	292.4	Martina Falke (GDR)	295.2
K1 team	United States; Louise Holcombe; Lyn Ashton; Candice Clark	337.9	Switzerland; Danielle Kamber; Elisabeth Käser; Eva Karel	360.9	East Germany; Sybille Spindler; Martina Falke; Marion Bauman	369.4

== Medals table ==
Rank	Nation	Gold	Silver	Bronze	Total
1	East Germany (GDR)	3	3	4	10
2	Czechoslovakia (TCH)	2	2	0	4
3	United States (USA)	2	1	0	3
4	West Germany (FRG)	1	0	2	3
5	Austria (AUT)	1	0	0	1
6	Poland (POL)	0	2	1	3
7	Switzerland (SUI)	0	1	0	1
8	France (FRA)	0	0	1	1
8	Netherlands (NED)	0	0	1	1
Totals (9 entries)		9	9	9	27
