= Peter van Stipdonk =

Dutch canoeist

Medal record

Men's canoe slalom

Representing Netherlands

World Championships
| Bronze medal – third place | 1973 Muotathal | Mixed C-2 |

Peter van Stipdonk (born in Eindhoven) is a former Dutch slalom canoeist who competed from the late 1960s to the late 1970s. He won a bronze medal in the mixed C-2 event at the 1973 ICF Canoe Slalom World Championships in Muotathal.
