= Jiří Krejza =

Medal record

Men's canoe slalom

World Championships

Representing Czechoslovakia
Gold medal – first place	1973 Muotathal	C-2
Silver medal – second place	1973 Muotathal	C-2 team
Bronze medal – third place	1971 Meran	Mixed C-2

Representing Switzerland
Silver medal – second place	1977 Spittal	C-2 team

Jiří Krejza is a former Czechoslovak-born Swiss slalom canoeist who competed from the early 1970s to the early 1980s. He won four medals at the ICF Canoe Slalom World Championships with a gold (C-2: 1973 for Czechoslovakia), two silvers (C-2 team: 1973 for Czechoslovakia, 1977 for Switzerland) and a bronze (Mixed C-2: 1971 for Czechoslovakia).
