= Machatas =

Machatas (Ancient Greek: Μαχάτας) may refer to:

- Machatas of Elimeia, early 4th century BC upper Macedonian prince
- Machatas of Europos, late 4th century BC upper Macedonian proxenos of Delphians
- Machatas (sculptor) from Acarnania
- Machatas of Aetolia (fl. 220 BC), ambassador of the Aetolian League to Sparta
- Machatas, father of Charops of Epirus 2nd century BC

== See also ==
- Machata
