= Brunnen =

Part of Ingenbohl, Switzerland

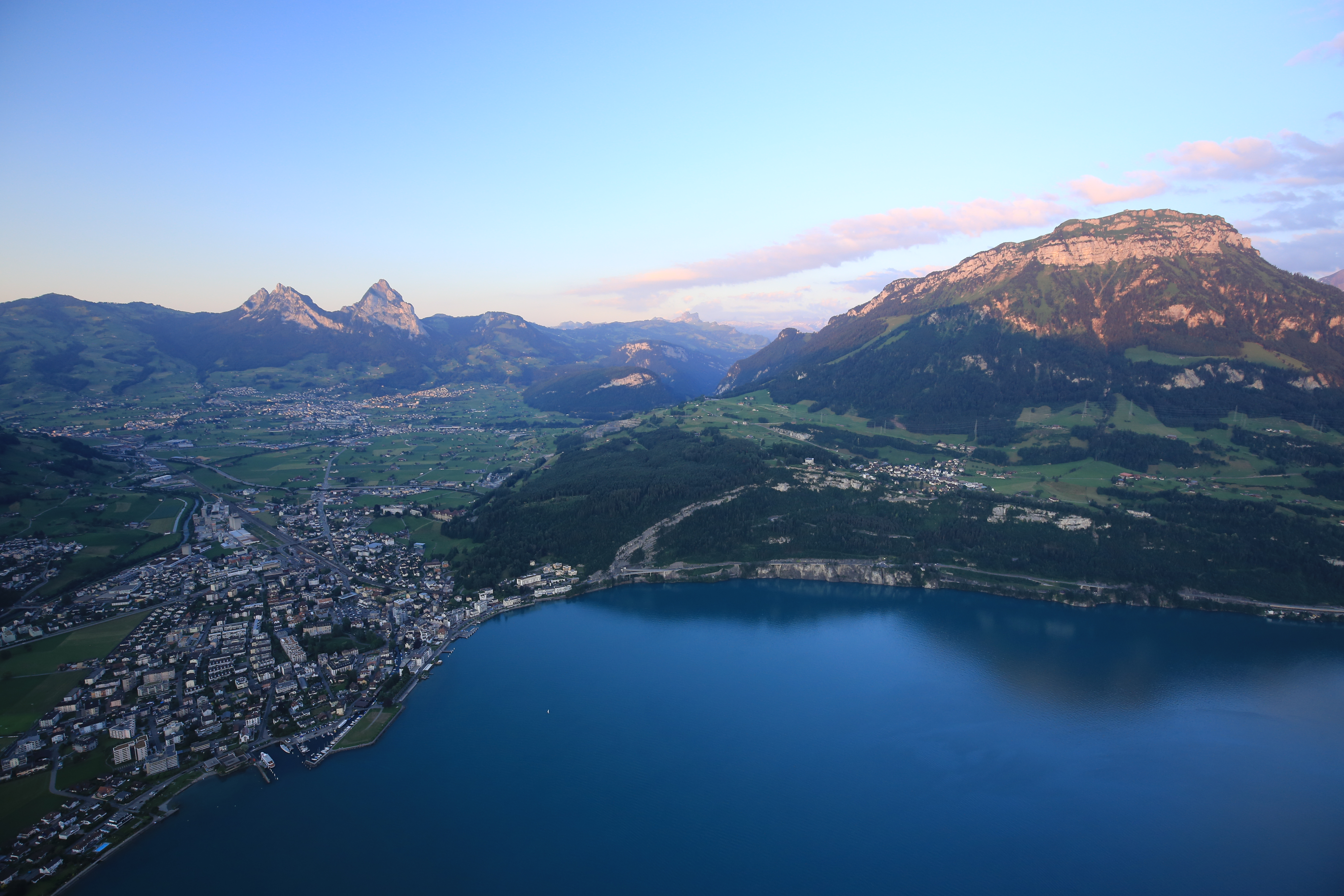
Brunnen (foreground), Fronalpstock (right) and Mythen (left)

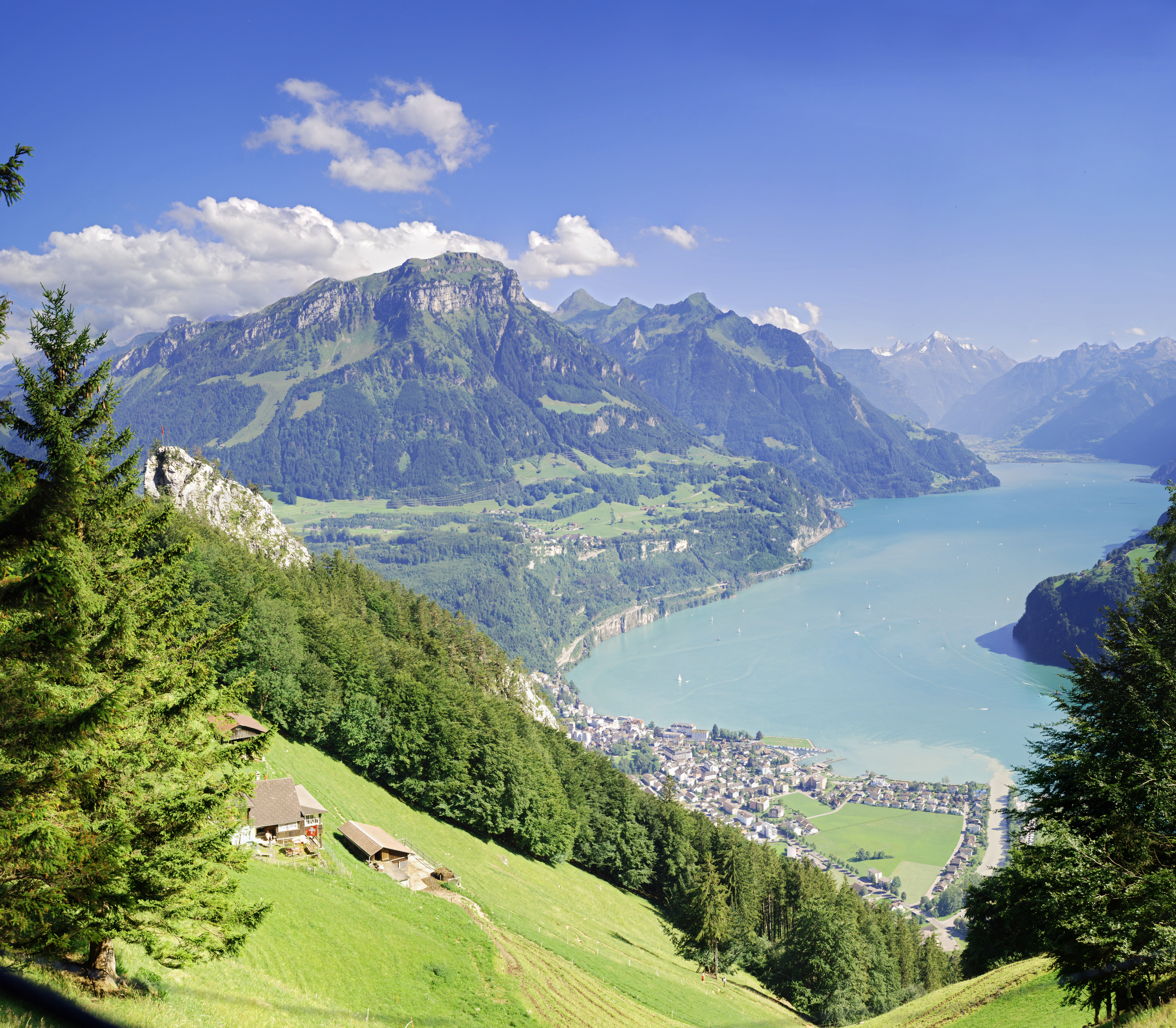
Brunnen and Lake Lucerne (2010)

Brunnen (Swiss Standard German pronunciation: [ˈbrʊnən]) is a resort on Lake Lucerne in Switzerland, part of the municipality Ingenbohl (Canton of Schwyz), at 46°59′44″N 8°36′17″E.

Brunnen railway station, on the Gotthard railway, is served by hourly InterRegio trains, and by lines S2 of the Stadtbahn Zug, which operates hourly between Zug, Arth-Goldau and Erstfeld, and S3 of the S-Bahn Luzern, which operates hourly to Lucerne.

Brunnen also has a cablecar that goes to the Urmiberg, a part of the Rigi offering views of Lake Lucerne and the Alps.

== History ==
Three Polish romantic poets, Adam Mickiewicz, Zygmunt Krasiński and Antoni Edward Odyniec stayed here overnight on 27/28 August 1830.

Winston Churchill spent his honeymoon in Brunnen. J. M. W. Turner painted several views from Brunnen, among his late watercolours, in the 1840s.

In 1947, the Swiss League for the Protection of Nature organised an international conference on the protection of nature in Brunnen. It resulted in the creation of the International Union for Conservation of Nature in 1948.

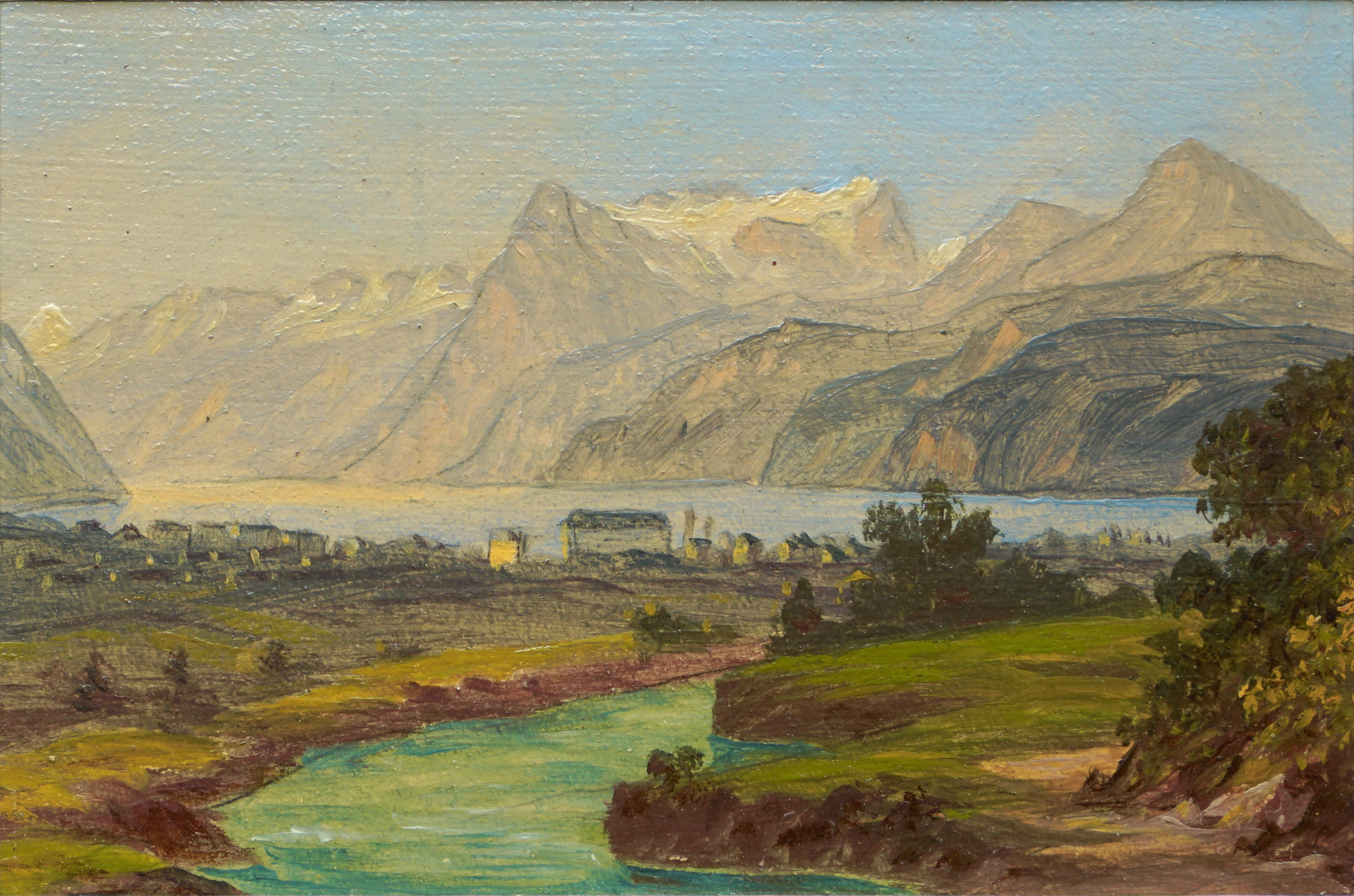
The river Muota, Brunnen, Lake Lucerne and Uri Rotstock from the north, c. 1870/80. Oil sketch (6.5 × 10 cm) by Heinrich Müller

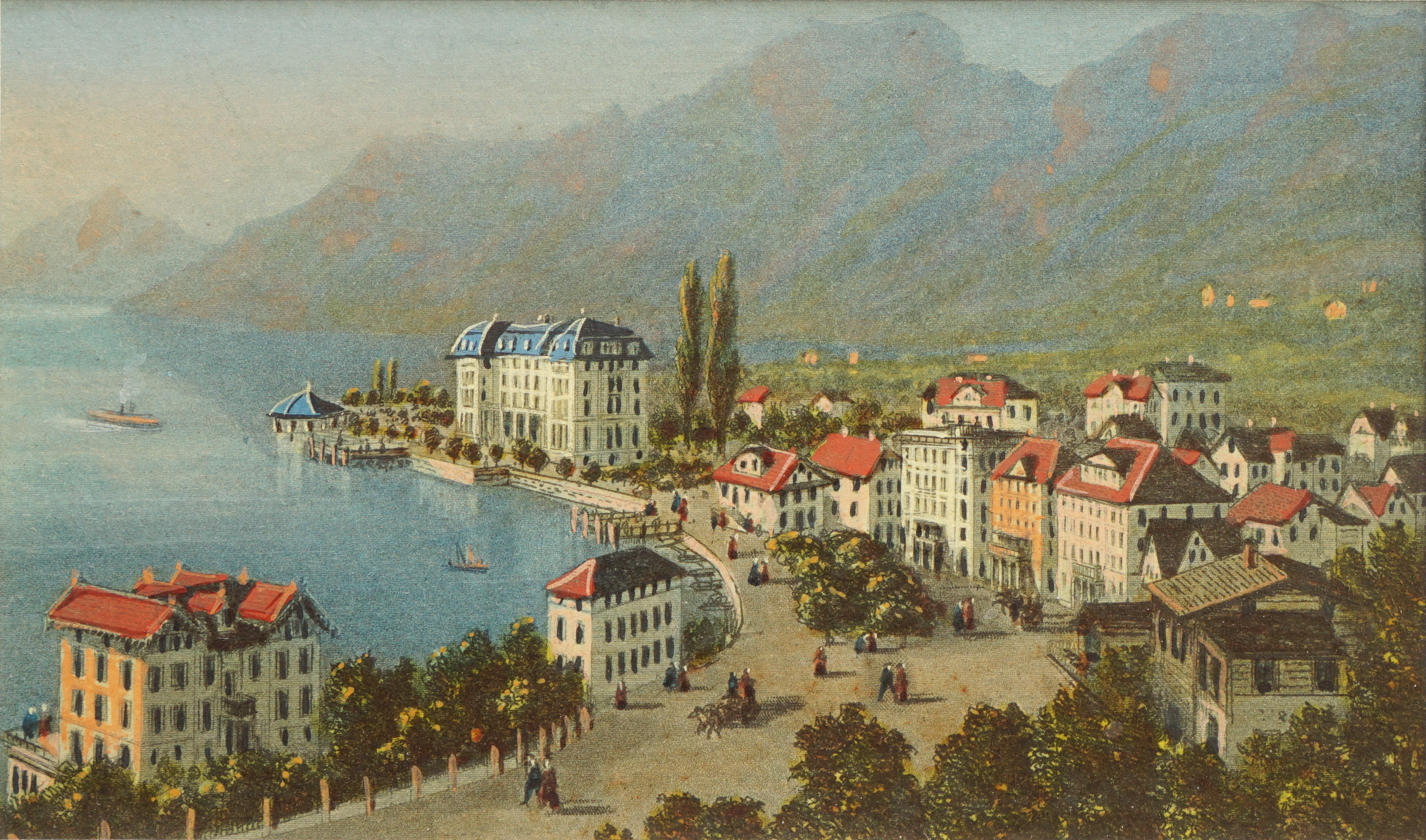
Brunnen and Rigi Hochflue from the south-east, c. 1880. Hand-coloured etching by Heinrich Müller

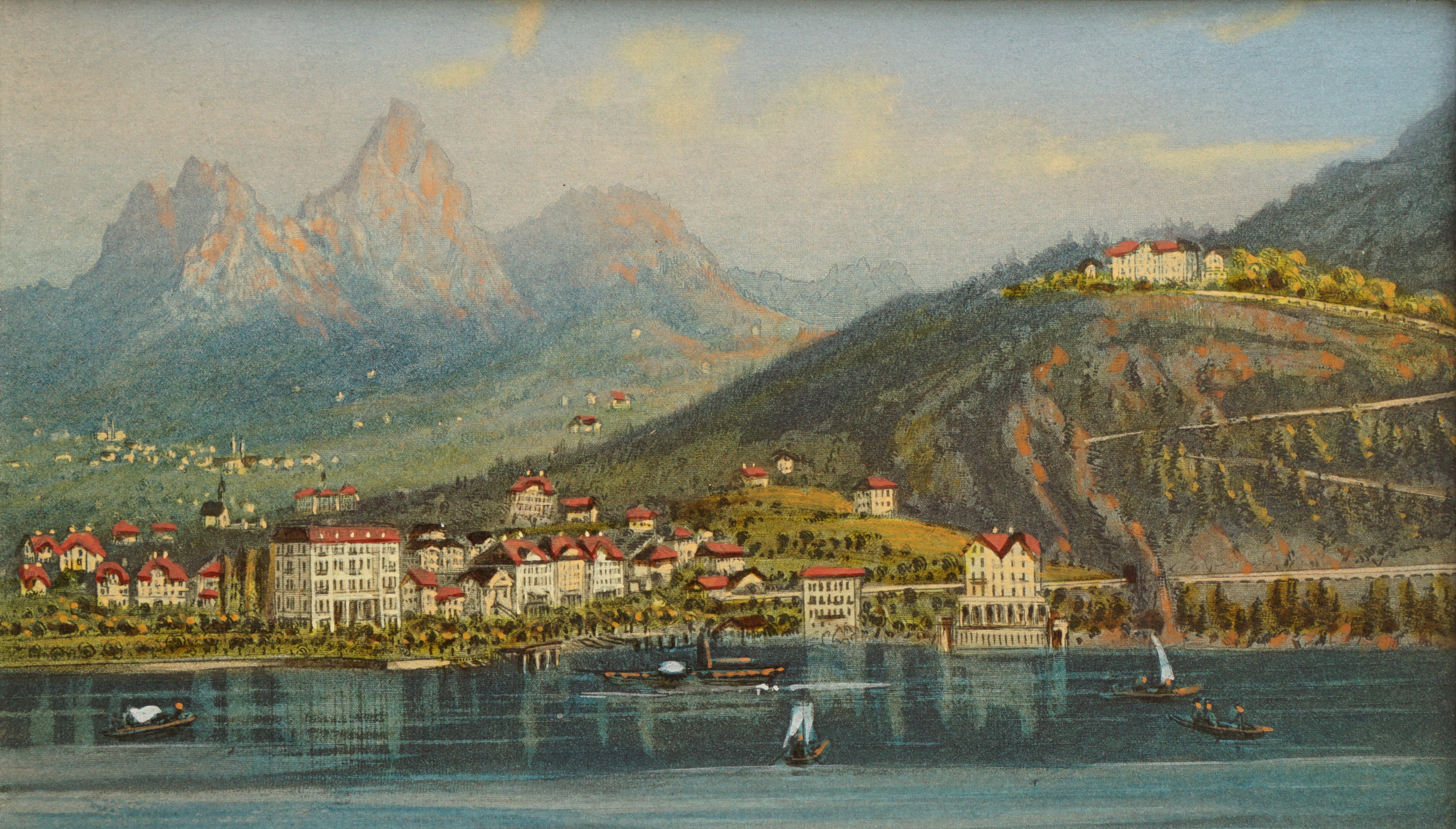
Brunnen, Mythen and Morschach (right) from the west, c. 1870. Heinrich Müller

== People ==
- Ugo Rondinone, a Swiss artist, was born in Brunnen
- Maria Katherina Scherer, nun of the convent Ingenbohl died in Brunnen
- Othmar Schoeck, a Swiss composer was born in Brunnen
