= Bohumír Machát =

Czech slalom canoeist

Medal record

Men's canoe slalom

Representing Czechoslovakia

World Championships
Silver medal – second place	1973 Muotathal	C-2 team

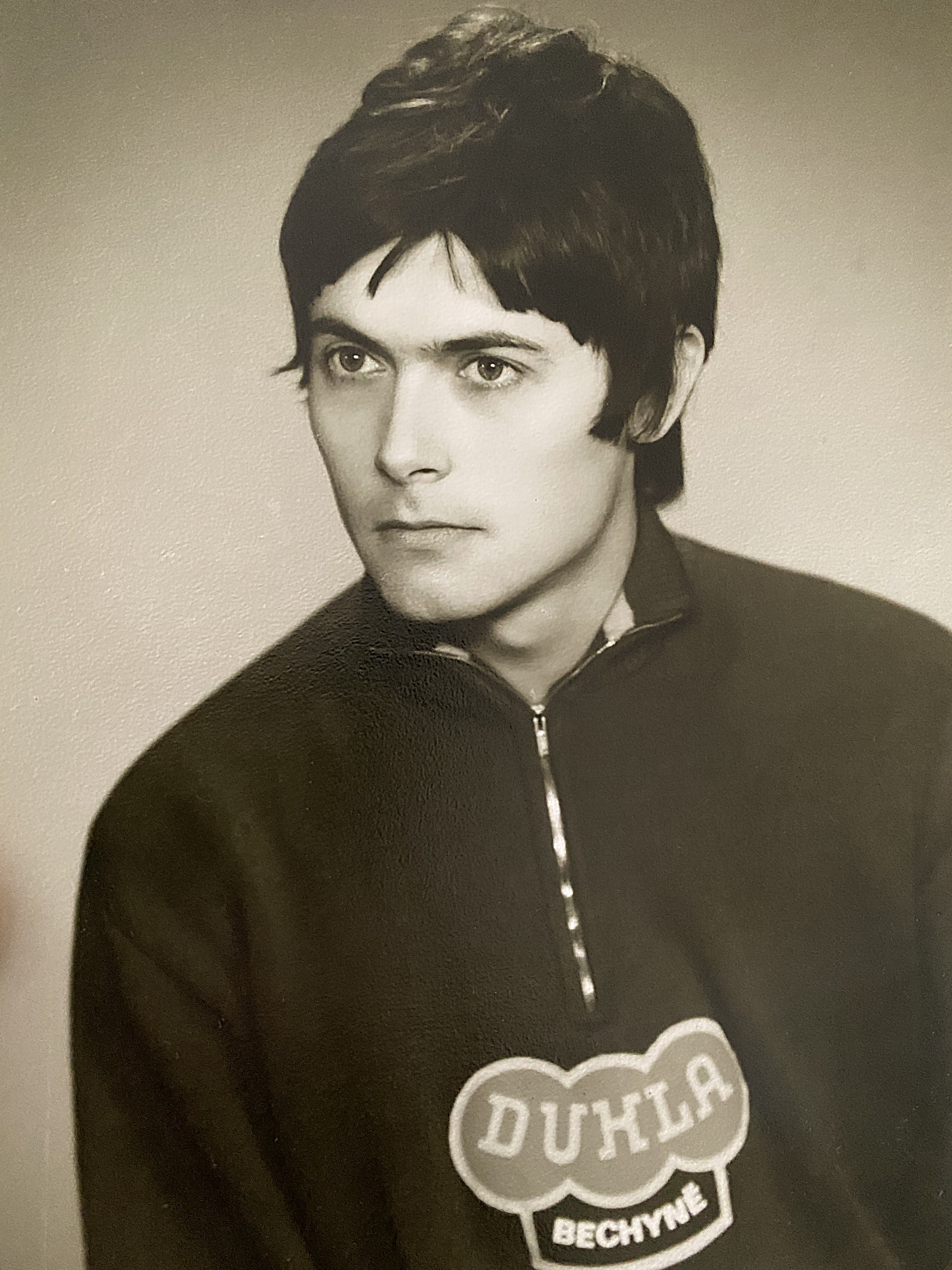
Machát in the early 1970s

Bohumír Machát (27 October 1947 in Kroměříž – 17 February 2021 in Prague) was a Czech slalom canoeist who competed for Czechoslovakia in the 1970s. He won a silver medal in the C-2 team event at the 1973 ICF Canoe Slalom World Championships in Muotathal.
