= Dave Knight =

American canoeist

Medal record

Men's canoe slalom

Representing United States

World Championships
Gold medal – first place	1973 Muotathal	Mixed C-2

Dave Knight is an American former slalom canoeist who competed in the 1970s. He won a gold medal in the mixed C-2 event at the 1973 ICF Canoe Slalom World Championships in Muotathal.
