= Ortstock =

Mountain in Switzerland

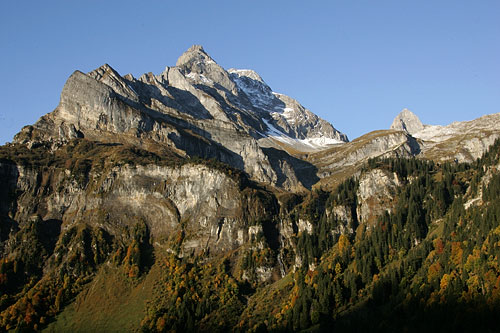
- The Ortstock from Braunwald

Highest point
- Elevation: 2,717 m (8,914 ft)
- Prominence: 539 m (1,768 ft)
- Parent peak: Schächentaler Windgällen
- Coordinates: 46°55′32″N 8°56′52.6″E

Geography
- Location within Switzerland Location within Canton of Glarus Location within Canton of Schwyz
- Country: Switzerland
- Cantons: Glarus / Schwyz
- Parent range: Schwyzer Alps

Climbing
- Easiest route: Trail

The Ortstock is a mountain in the Schwyzer Alps, located at an elevation of 2,717 m (8,914 ft) on the border between the cantons of Schwyz and Glarus, Switzerland. The mountain lies in the municipalities of Muotathal, in the canton of Schwyz, and Glarus Süd, in the canton of Glarus.

It overlooks Braunwald and Linthal on its east side, while the west side overlooks the high valley of Glattalp. There are no glaciers surrounding the Ortstock, although a few névés can be found on its northern side. The north and south faces are very steep but experienced hikers can reach the summit via a trail on its less steep western flank.

== See also ==
- List of mountains of the canton of Glarus
- List of mountains of the canton of Schwyz
