= Liblice =

- Municipality
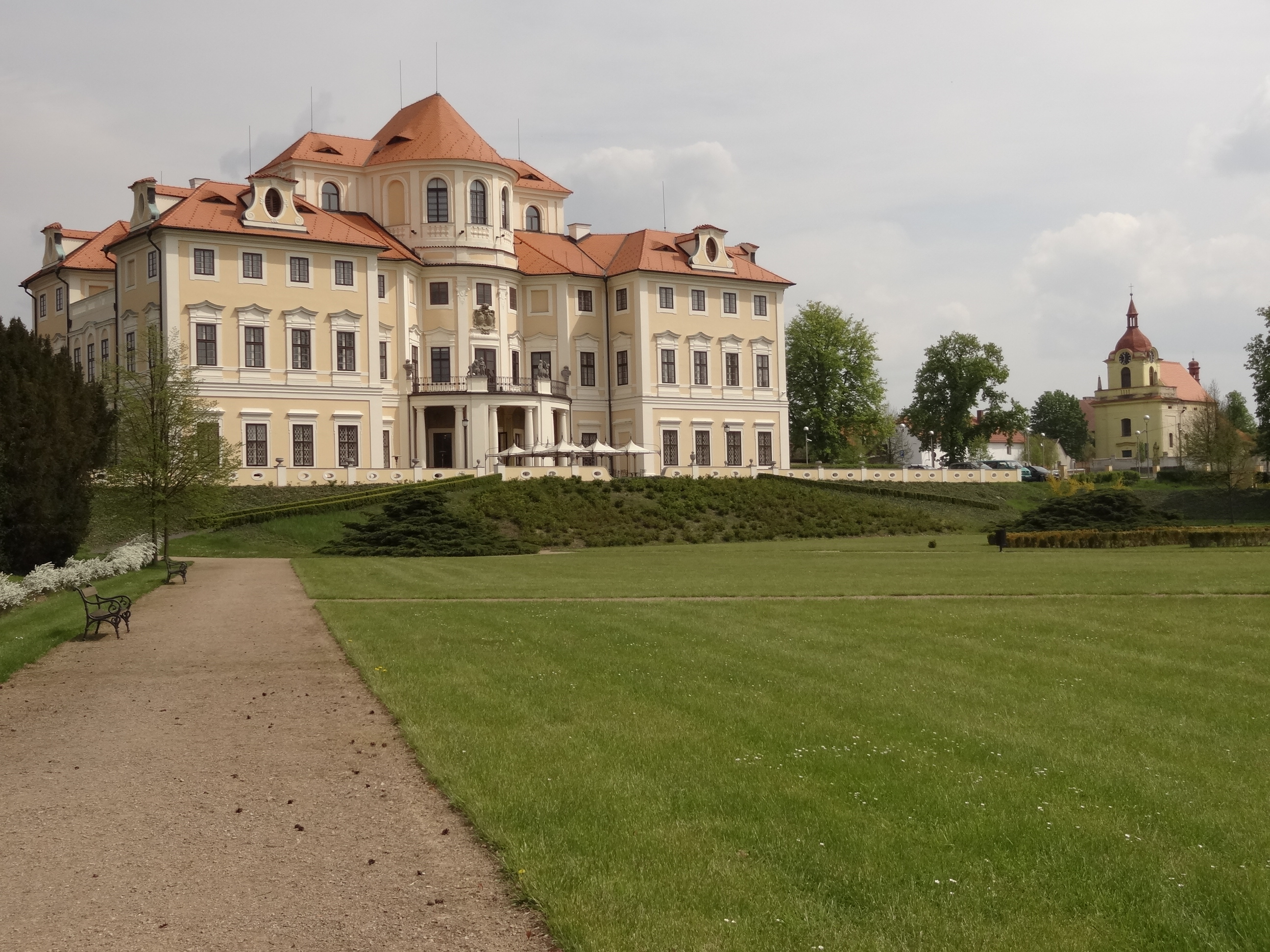
- Liblice Castle and Church of Saint Wenceslaus

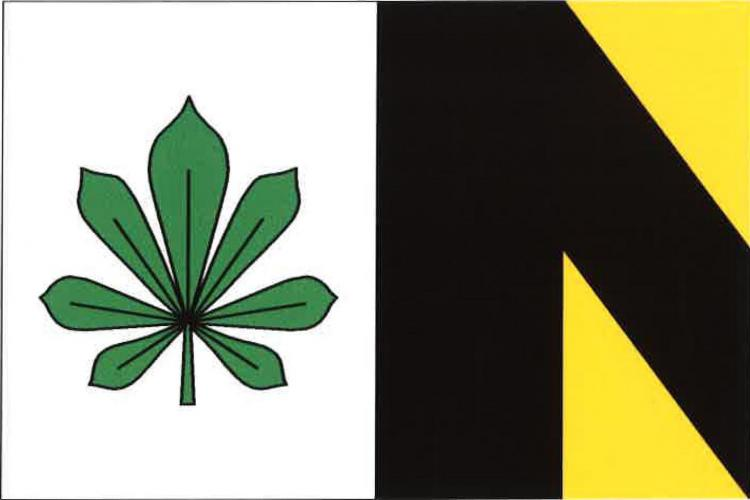
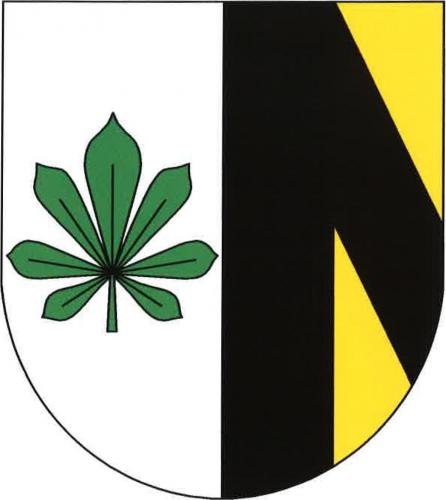
- Flag Coat of arms

- Location in the Czech Republic
- Coordinates: 50°18′48″N 14°35′26″E
- Country: Czech Republic
- Region: Central Bohemian
- District: Mělník
- First mentioned: 1254

Area
  - Total: 8.92 km^{2} (3.44 sq mi)
- Elevation: 197 m (646 ft)

Population (2026-01-01)
  - Total: 498
  - Density: 55.8/km^{2} (145/sq mi)
- Time zone: UTC+1 (CET)
  - Summer (DST): UTC+2 (CEST)
- Postal code: 277 32
- Website: www.liblice.cz

Liblice is a municipality and village in Mělník District in the Central Bohemian Region of the Czech Republic. It has about 500 inhabitants.

== Etymology ==
The initial name of the village was Ľubice. The name was derived from the personal name Ľuba, meaning "the village of Ľuba's people". The name then gradually changed to its current form.

== Geography ==
Liblice is located 8 kilometres (5 mi) southeast of Mělník and 23 km (14 mi) north of Prague. It lies mostly in the Jizera Table, only the southern part of the municipality extends into the Central Elbe Table. The stream Košátecký potok flows through the southern part of the municipality.

== History ==
The first written mention of Liblice is from 1254.

== Demographics ==
Historical population

Year	Pop.	±%
1869	500	—
1880	592	+18.4%
1890	605	+2.2%
1900	564	−6.8%
1910	567	+0.5%

Year	Pop.	±%
1921	507	−10.6%
1930	589	+16.2%
1950	546	−7.3%
1961	501	−8.2%
1970	534	+6.6%

Year	Pop.	±%
1980	542	+1.5%
1991	510	−5.9%
2001	464	−9.0%
2011	499	+7.5%
2021	470	−5.8%

Source: Censuses

== Transport ==
The I/16 road, which connects the D10 motorway with Mělník, runs through the municipality.

== Sights ==
The main sight of Liblice is a Baroque castle built in 1699–1706, designed by Giovanni Battista Alliprandi for Count Arnošt Josef Pachta of Rájov. The castle serves since 1952 as a conference and recreational facility of Czech Academy of Sciences and was not accessible to the public until 2007. An extensive reconstruction of the castle was completed in 2007, changing the premises into a conference and culturally-educational centre, a castle hotel with restaurants and a relaxing wellness centre.

The Church of Saint Wenceslaus was originally a Gothic medieval church. It was rebuilt in the Baroque style around 1710.

== Notable people ==
- Emil Pollert (1877–1935), opera singer
