= Machat =

Machat, Machát is a surname. Notable people with the surname include:

- Bohumír Machát (born 1947), Czechoslovak slalom canoeist
- Jeff Machat (born 1961), American ophthalmologist
- Mike Machat, American artist, author, and aviator
- Steven Machat (born 1952), American lawyer and entertainment executive
