= Muota =

River in Switzerland

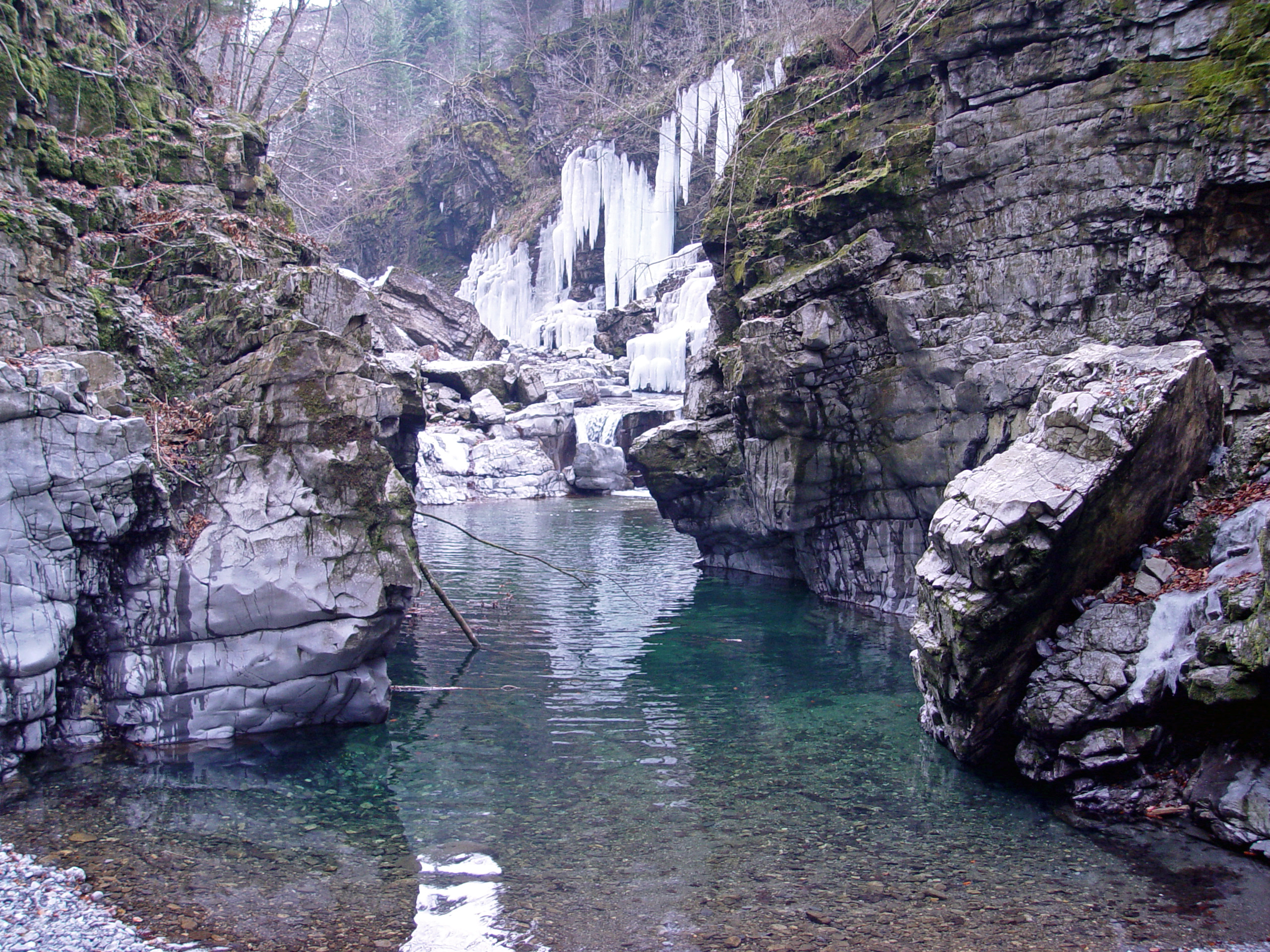
- The Muota in a narrow canyon near Ibach

Location
- Country: Switzerland
- Canton: Canton of Schwyz

Physical characteristics
- Source: Ruosalp
  - elevation: 1,800 m (5,900 ft)
- Mouth: Lake Lucerne
  - location: Brunnen
  - coordinates: 46.9950°N 8.5942°E
  - elevation: 434 m (1,424 ft)
- Length: 29 km (18 mi)

Basin features
- Progression: Lake Lucerne→ Reuss→ Aare→ Rhine→ North Sea

The Muota is a river in the Swiss canton of Schwyz and a tributary of Lake Lucerne. It has a length of 29 km (18 mi).

The Muota rises on the Ruosalp, an alp to the north of the Glatten on the border between the cantons of Schwyz and Uri. Initially, it flows in a northerly direction through the tiny Bisistal before turning west to the villages of Muotathal and Ried.

Beyond Ried, the river flows through a narrow defile between the Gibelhorn and Stooshorn, passing under the Stoosbahn funicular that serves the mountain resort of Stoos, as it does so. After leaving this canyon, the river turns north to reach the village of Ibach in the municipality of Schwyz. At Ibach the river turns west again, then shortly afterwards passes under the A4 motorway and the Gotthard railway line before receiving the Seeweren, which is the outfall stream of Lake Lauerz. Here it flows south-west to enter Lake Lucerne on the west side of the town of Brunnen in the municipality of Ingenbohl.

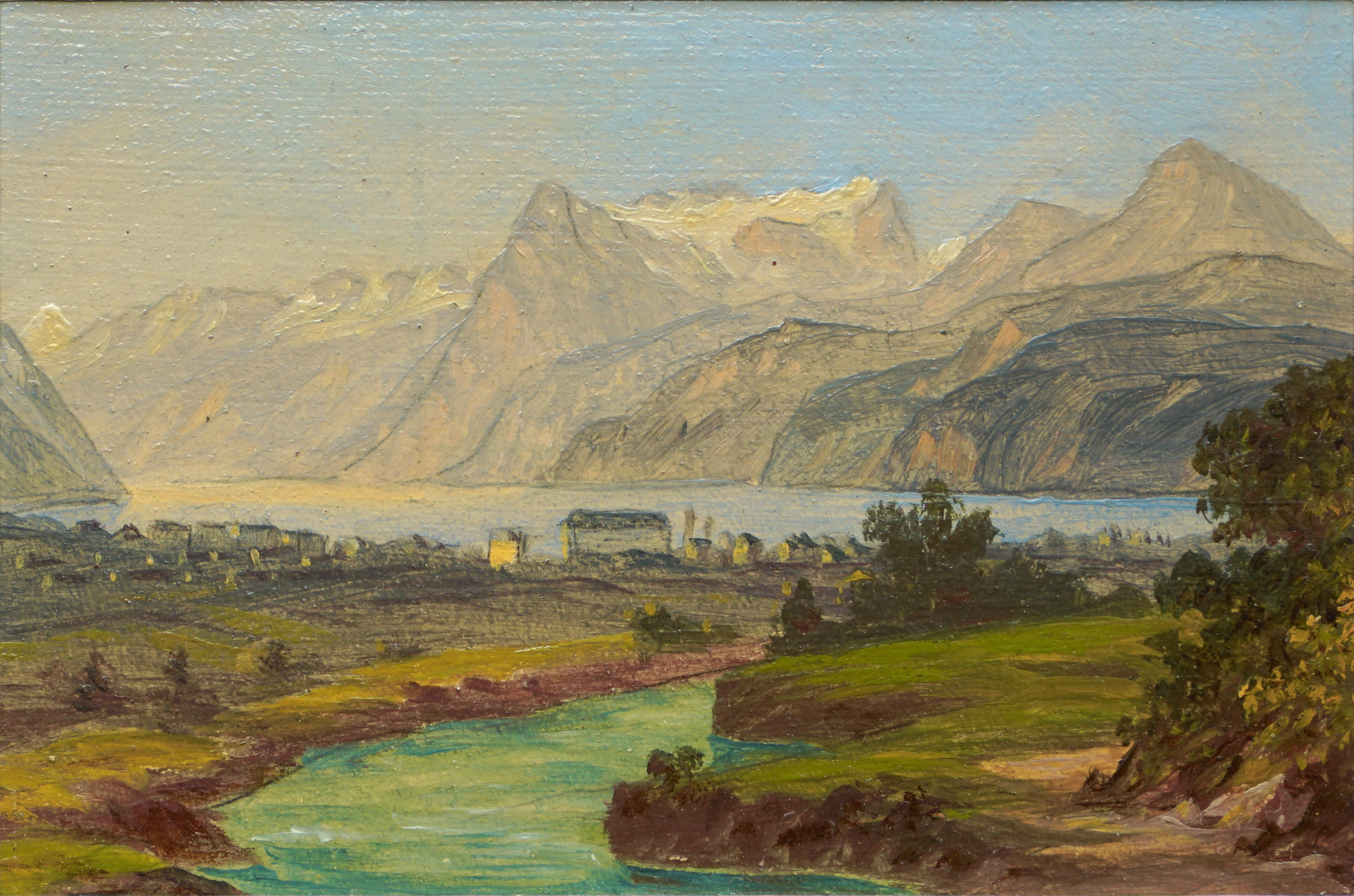
The Muota, Brunnen, Lake Lucerne and Uri Rotstock around 1870. Oil sketch (6.5 × 10 cm) by Heinrich Müller

== See also ==
- List of rivers of Switzerland
