= Machate =

Machate is a surname. Notable people with the surname include:

- Fritz Machate (1916–1999), German footballer
- Gottlieb Machate (1904–1974), German chess master
- Kevin Machate (1971-), American filmmaker

== See also ==
- Machata
