= Wolfgang Büchner (canoeist) =

East German canoeist

Medal record

Men's canoe slalom

Representing East Germany

World Championships
Gold medal – first place	1973 Muotathal	K-1 team

Wolfgang Büchner is a former slalom canoeist who competed for East Germany in the 1970s. He won a gold medal in the K-1 team event at the 1973 ICF Canoe Slalom World Championships in Muotathal.
