= Emil Pollert (canoeist) =

Czech slalom canoeist

Medal record

Men's canoe slalom

Representing Czechoslovakia

World Championships
Gold medal – first place	1965 Spittal an der Drau	C-2 team

Emil Pollert (9 May 1938 – 27 January 2014) was a Czech slalom canoeist and physical chemist. He competed for Czechoslovakia in the 1960s and won a gold medal in the C-2 team event at the 1965 ICF Canoe Slalom World Championships in Spittal an der Drau with his brother Jaroslav.

== Life ==
Pollert was born on 9 May 1938. In addition to his racing career, he also had a successful scientific career. He was a physical chemist and inventor. He became a docent and doctor of science. He studied magnetic substances at the Institute of Physics of the Academy of Sciences of the Czech Republic. He was also a teacher at the Czech Technical University in Prague for some time.

After ending his career as an active athlete, he became an official (Vice-chairman of the Czech Canoeing Association) and co-organizer of the Prague-Troja races. He died on 27 January 2014, at the age of 75.

Emil Pollert was grandson of the opera singer Emil Pollert, son of the virtuoso pianist Jaroslav Pollert I (born 1910), older brother of the canoeist Jaroslav Pollert II (born 1943), father of the canoeist and 1992 Olympic winner Lukáš Pollert, father of the actress Klára Pollertová and uncle of the canoeist Jaroslav Pollert III (born 1971).
