= Silberen =

Mountain

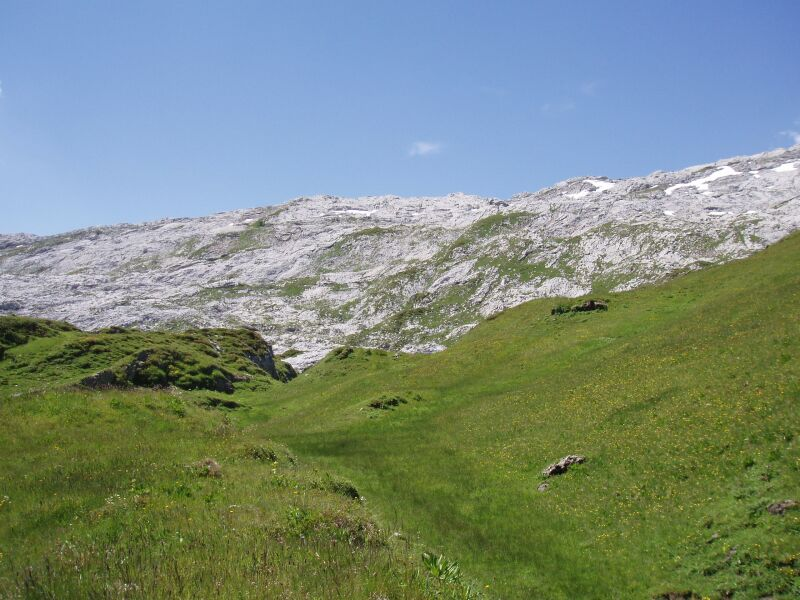

Highest point
- Elevation: 2,319 m (7,608 ft)
- Prominence: 199 m (653 ft)
- Parent peak: Glärnisch
- Coordinates: 46°59′32″N 8°53′58″E

Geography
- Location within Switzerland Location within Canton of Schwyz
- Country: Switzerland
- Canton: Schwyz
- Parent range: Schwyzer Alps

The Silberen (2,319 m [7,608 ft]) is a mountain of the Schwyzer Alps, located east of the Pragel Pass in the canton of Schwyz, Switzerland. On its eastern side, the mountain overlooks the lake of Klöntal.

The summit consists of a large karstic plateau. Its name, meaning 'silver' in English, derives from the light color of the bare rock.

In winter, it is a popular mountain for ski touring.

== See also ==
- List of mountains of the canton of Schwyz
