= Antonín Brabec (canoeist) =

Czech slalom canoeist

Medal record

Men's canoe slalom

Representing Czechoslovakia

World Championships
Silver medal – second place	1973 Muotathal	C-2 team
Silver medal – second place	1975 Skopje	C-2 team
Bronze medal – third place	1971 Meran	C-2 team
Bronze medal – third place	1975 Skopje	C-2

Antonín Brabec (2 April 1946, Dolní Kounice – September 2017, Bechyně) was a Czech slalom canoeist who competed for Czechoslovakia from the late 1960s to the mid-1970s. He won four medals at the ICF Canoe Slalom World Championships with two silvers (C-2 team: 1973, 1975) and two bronzes (C-2: 1975, C-2 team: 1971).

Brabec also finished 10th in the C-2 event at the 1972 Summer Olympics in Munich.
