= Emil Pollert =

Czech opera singer (1877–1935)

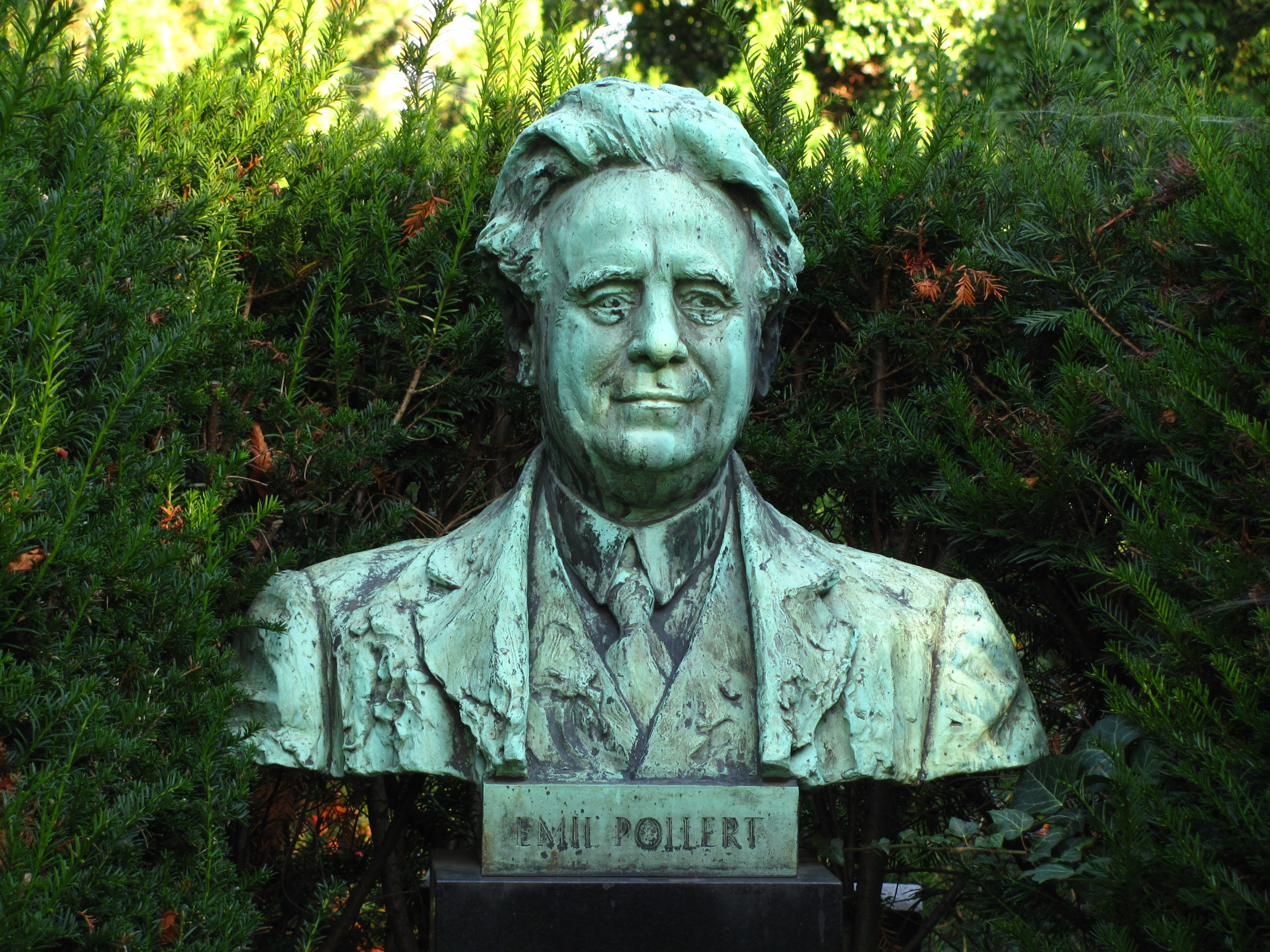
- Bust of Pollert on his tomb at Vinohrady Cemetery
- Born: Emil Popper; 20 January 1877; Liblice, Bohemia, Austria-Hungary
- Died: 23 October 1935 (aged 58); Prague, Czechoslovakia
- Resting place: Vinohrady Cemetery
- Occupation: Opera singer
- Years active: 1898–1935
- Known for: Bass roles at the National Theatre

Emil Pollert (born Emil Popper; 20 January 1877 – 23 October 1935) was a Czech opera singer at the National Theatre in Prague. In his time, he was the main representative of bass roles.

== Life ==
Pollert was born on 20 January 1877 in Liblice, Bohemia, Austria-Hungary. His talent was discovered by his brother, who in his adulthood financed his singing lessons with Francis Pivoda and Moritz Wallerstein. His study did not last long; he was engaged in Olomouc in the season 1898–1899, following which he was recommended to the National Theatre and immediately accepted.

Pollert's voice was strong and granular, extremely resonant, with an extraordinary range, its color gradually cultivated into a soft and velvety tone. He was regarded as particularly suited to comedic roles, which he played realistically, with a tendency to naturalism.

His debut was in the dramatic opera Byl jednou jeden král. Following this, successful performances followed in such operas as Dalibor, Tannhäuser, Rusalka and The Bartered Bride. He gradually gained fame for his performance in comic roles. After the retirement of prominent bassist Václav Kliment, Pollert took his place at the center of the stage, representing a total of 221 roles in more than 5,000 performances.

Besides performing in operatic roles, he was involved in the production of several ballets and starred in the comic operetta, The Mikado. He directed 12 operas himself. He founded and led an organization for soloists of the National Theatre, and from 1920 to 1922, was director of opera and theatre at the Švandovo Arena in Prague. In 1927, he was awarded the State Prize for excellent work in the National Theatre.

Pollert died in Prague of a heart attack on 23 October 1935, just before his scheduled appearance in the role of Boniface in Bedřich Smetana's The Secret. He is buried at the Vinohrady Cemetery. The National Theatre features a bust of Pollert, created by sculptor Charles Dvorak.

=== Family ===
Emil Pollert is the father of the virtuoso pianist Jaroslav Pollert I (born 1910) and grandfather of the canoeists and chemists Emil Pollert and Jaroslav Pollert II.

== Notable performances ==
He focused particularly on roles by Czech composers, particularly those by Smetana. He sang Kecal in The Bartered Bride in Warsaw, Bucharest, Vienna and many places in Bohemia. He developed the character in detail, not only singing but acting, with special emphasis on gesture, facial expressions and body positioning. Critics praised both his forceful comic and accurate vocal performance. He performed this role at the anniversary of the opera at the National Theatre. His performance as Kecal was recorded in 1933 (where he was conducted by Otakar Ostrčil) and preserved twice on film: in a silent version of 1913 (directed by Max Urban) and one with sound of 1933 (film director, Svatopluk Innemann; theatre director, Jaroslav Kvapil).
