= Jaroslav Pollert (canoeist, born 1943) =

Czech canoeist

Medal record

Men's canoe slalom

Representing Czechoslovakia

World Championships
Gold medal – first place	1961 Hainsberg	C-1 team
Gold medal – first place	1965 Spittal an der Drau	C-2 team
Gold medal – first place	1973 Muotathal	C-2
Silver medal – second place	1973 Muotathal	C-2 team

Jaroslav Pollert (born 16 August 1943) is a Czech physical chemist and former slalom canoeist. He competed for Czechoslovakia from the late 1950s to the mid-1970s. He won four medals at the ICF Canoe Slalom World Championships with three golds (C-2: 1973, C-1 team: 1961, C-2 team: 1965) and a silver (C-2 team: 1973). He teamed with his brother Emil.

== Life ==
Jaroslav Pollert was born on 16 August 1943 in Prague. He is grandson of the opera singer Emil Pollert, son of the virtuoso pianist Jaroslav Pollert I (born 1910), younger brother of the canoeist Emil Pollert, father of the canoeist Jaroslav Pollert III (born 1971) and uncle of the canoeist and 1992 Olympic winner Lukáš Pollert and the actress Klára Pollertová.
