= Glattalpsee =

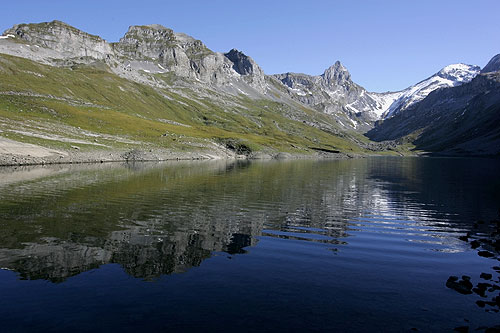

- Location within Canton of Schwyz Location within Switzerland Location within Alps
- Interactive map of Glattalpsee
- Location: Canton of Schwyz
- Coordinates: 46°55′10″N 8°54′20″E
- Type: reservoir
- Basin countries: Switzerland
- Surface area: 39 ha (96 acres)
- Surface elevation: 1,852 m (6,076 ft)

Glattalpsee is a reservoir on the Glattalp plateau, above Bisisthal, in the municipality of Muotathal, Canton of Schwyz, Switzerland. The lake's water is used by the Sahli powerplant in Bisisthal to produce electricity.

== Geography ==
The surface area is 27.6 ha (68 acres). The lake is located at an altitude of 1,852 m (6,076 ft). Although the lake lies within the canton of Schwyz, it is considered to be part of the Glarus Alps. Its tributaries are the Glattalpseebach, Vorderer Läckibach and Hinterer Läckibach.

The natural lake has no surface outflow. A part of the water seeps through the karst lake bed, while the rest of is used by the Sahli powerplant. Almost half the water that could be used by the powerplant is lost to seepage (up to 700 litres (185 gallons) per second). In order to increase productivity, it is planned to partially seal the lake bed (roughly 12% of the surface area).

Because of the leaking lake bed, the Glattalpsee dries out during winter months and only refills, once the snow starts melting in spring.

Starting at the summit station Glattalp of the gondola lift running between Sahli (Bisisthal) and the Glattalp plateau, there is a roughly 7 km (4.3 mi) long hiking trail along the lake's shores with the SAC hut Glattalphütte and the restaurant Berggasthaus along the trail. This loop has minimal elevation gain.

On February 7, 1991 a temperature of −52.5 °C (−62.5 °F) was registered, the lowest ever in Switzerland.

== See also ==
- List of mountain lakes of Switzerland
