= Uri Rotstock =

Mountain in Switzerland

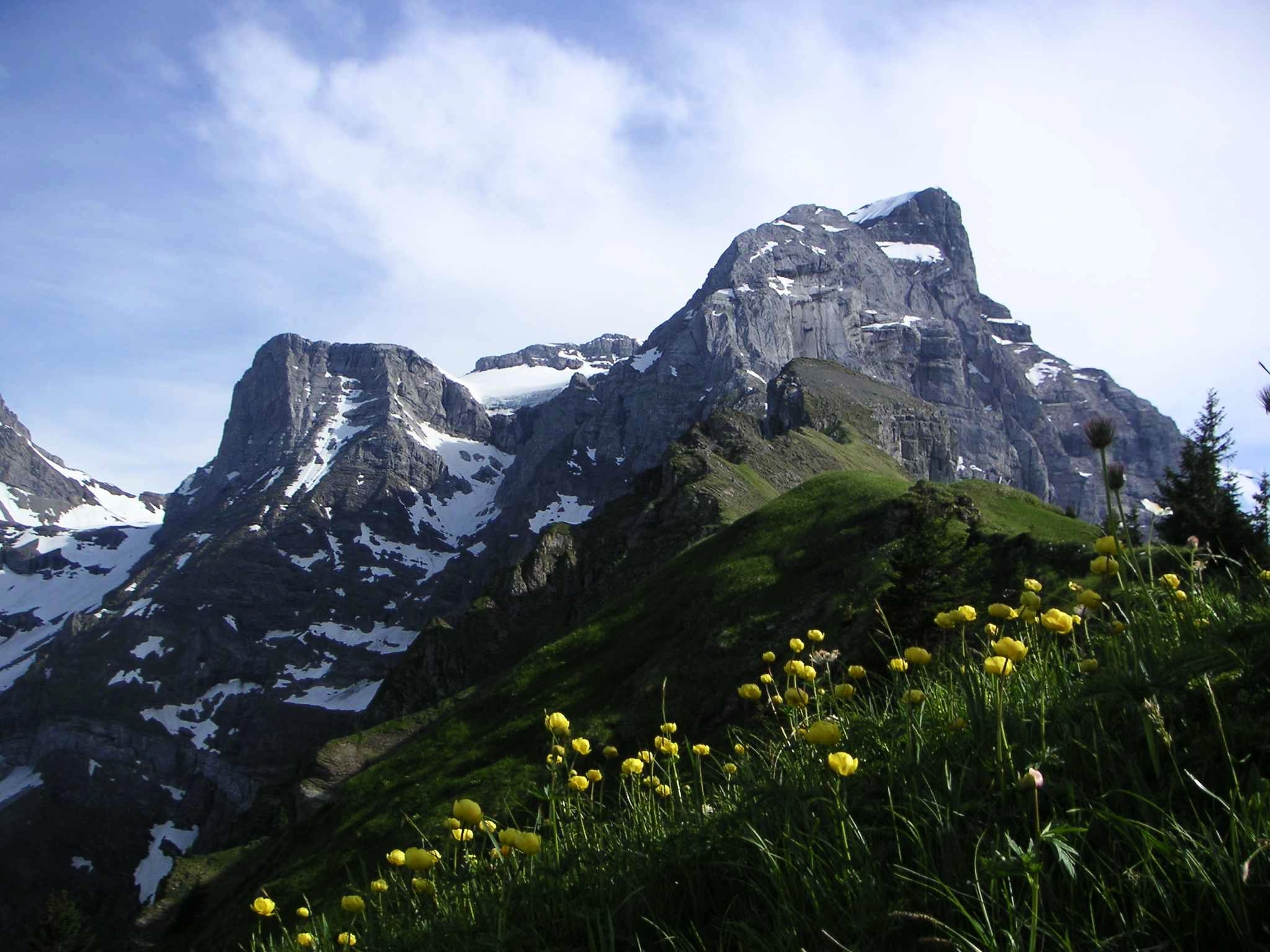

Highest point
- Elevation: 2,929 m (9,610 ft)
- Prominence: 248 m (814 ft)
- Parent peak: Brunnistock
- Coordinates: 46°51′42.5″N 8°32′7″E

Geography
- Location within Switzerland
- Country: Switzerland
- Canton: Uri
- Parent range: Uri Alps
- Topo map: Swiss Federal Office of Topography swisstopo

The Uri Rotstock is a mountain on the territory of Isenthal, Uri, Switzerland and part of the Uri Alps.

== In literature ==
In Alan Dean Foster's 1984 science-fiction novel The I Inside, the great supercomputer known as The Colligatarch, the de facto ruler of the world, is located inside Uri Rotstock.
