= Muotathal =

- Municipality
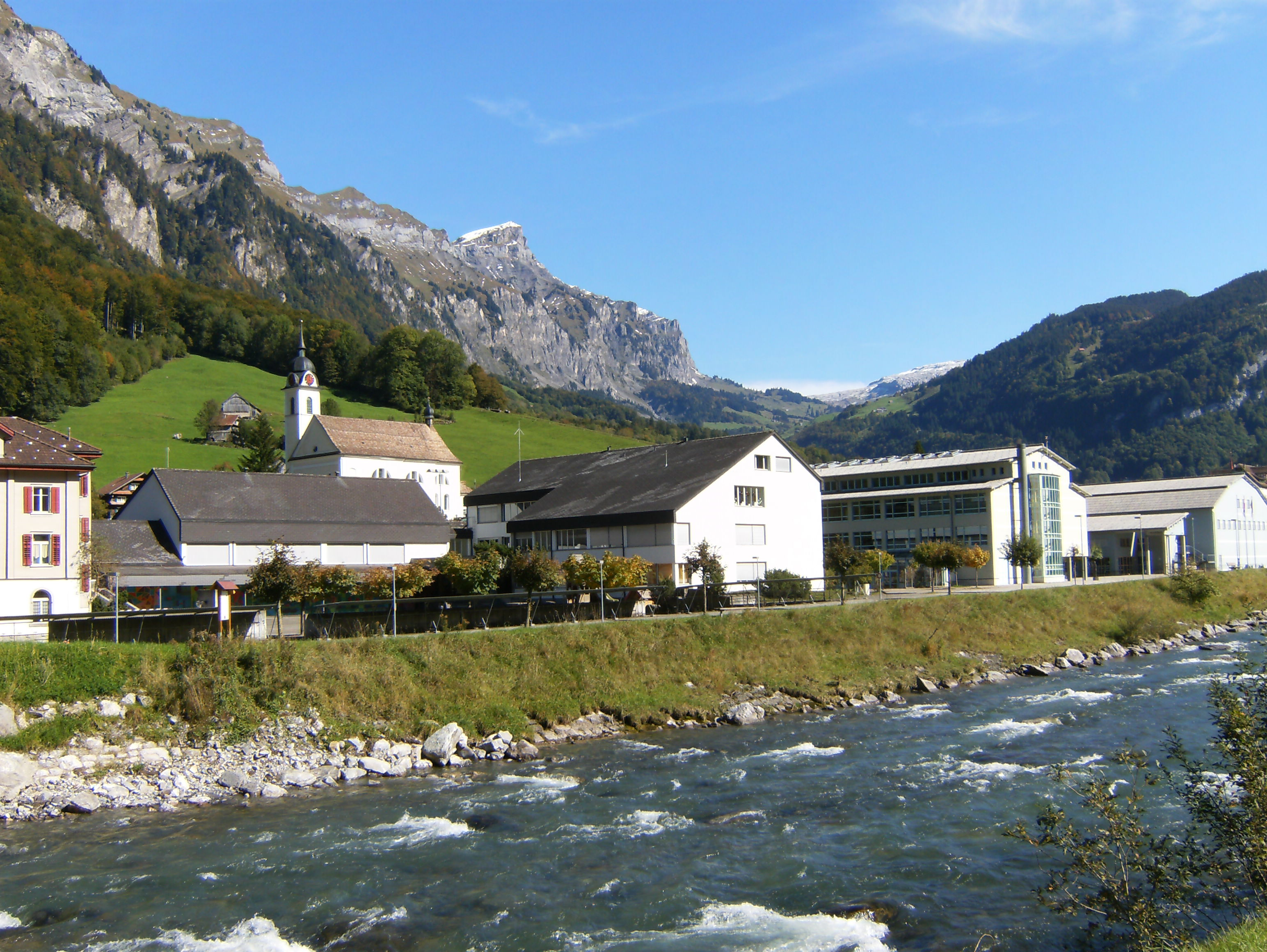

- Flag Coat of arms
- Location of Muotathal
- Location within Switzerland Location within Canton of Schwyz
- Coordinates: 46°58′28″N 8°45′32″E
- Country: Switzerland
- Canton: Schwyz
- District: Schwyz

Area
  - Total: 172.15 km^{2} (66.47 sq mi)
- Elevation (Church Muotathal): 626 m (2,054 ft)

Population (December 2020)
  - Total: 3,470
  - Density: 20.2/km^{2} (52.2/sq mi)
- Demonym: German: Muotathaler/-in
- Time zone: UTC+01:00 (CET)
  - Summer (DST): UTC+02:00 (CEST)
- Postal code: 6436
- SFOS number: 1367
- ISO 3166 code: CH-SZ
- Localities: Ried, Schachen, Wil, Hinterthal, Chrüz, Pragel, Bisisthal, Glattalp, Toralp, Charetalp, Goldplangg
- Surrounded by: Bürglen (UR), Glarus (GL), Glarus Süd (GL), Illgau, Innerthal, Morschach, Oberiberg, Riemenstalden, Spiringen (UR), Schwyz, Unteriberg, Unterschächen (UR)
- Website: www.muotathal.ch

Muotathal is a village and a municipality in Schwyz District in the canton of Schwyz in Switzerland. The eponymous valley, the Muotatal, is formed by the Muota, which joins Lake Lucerne at Brunnen.

== History ==
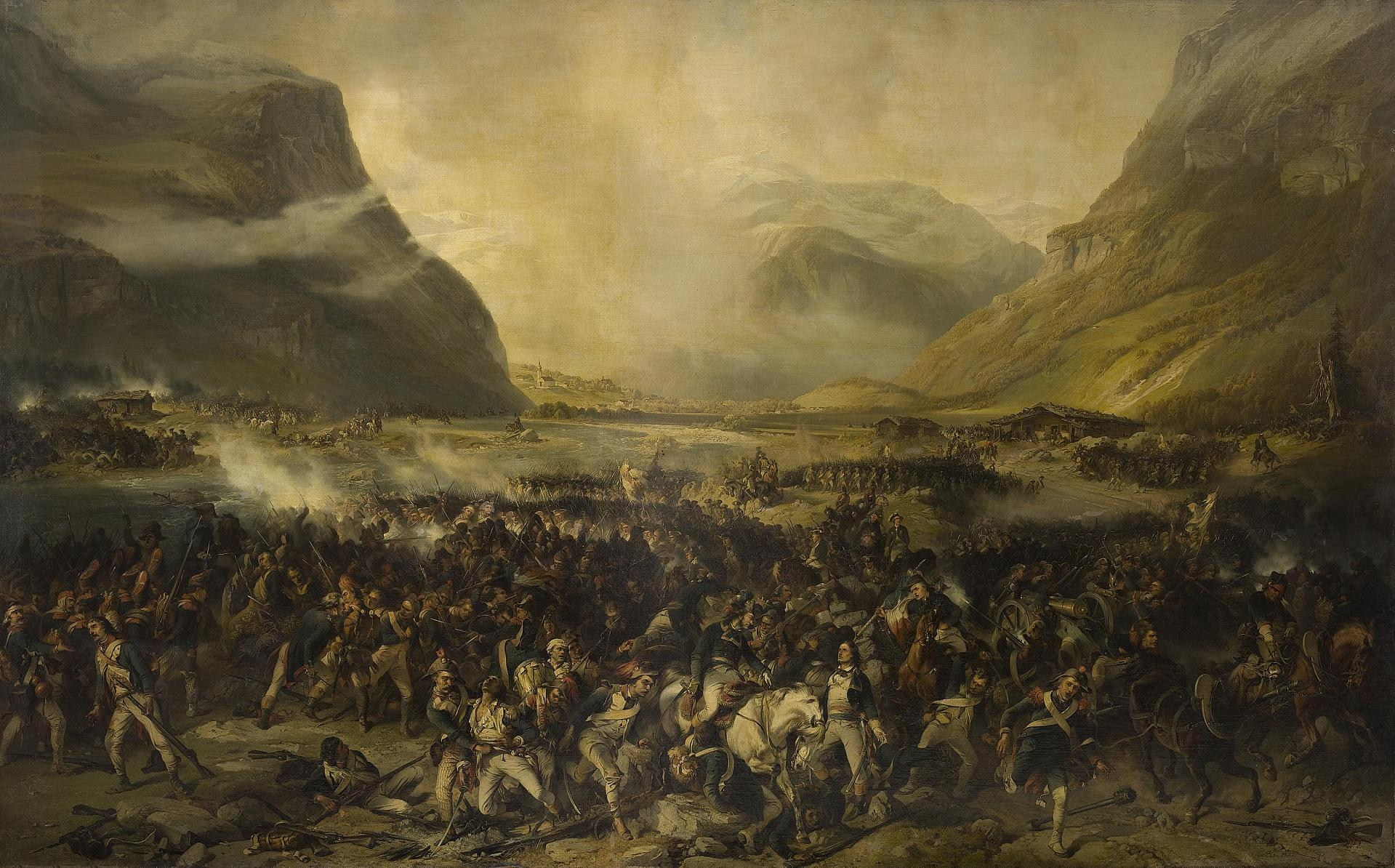
Battle of Muotatal, 1799 by Alexander Kotzebue

Muotathal is first mentioned in 1246 as Muthathal and Mutetal.

In 1799, 30 September – 1 October, during Suvorov's Swiss campaign (part of War of the Second Coalition), a numerically inferior Russian rearguard fought the French troops in the Muotatal, covering the march of the main force, and inflicted a heavy defeat, thus saving the Imperial Russian Army's forces from possible destruction.

== Geography ==
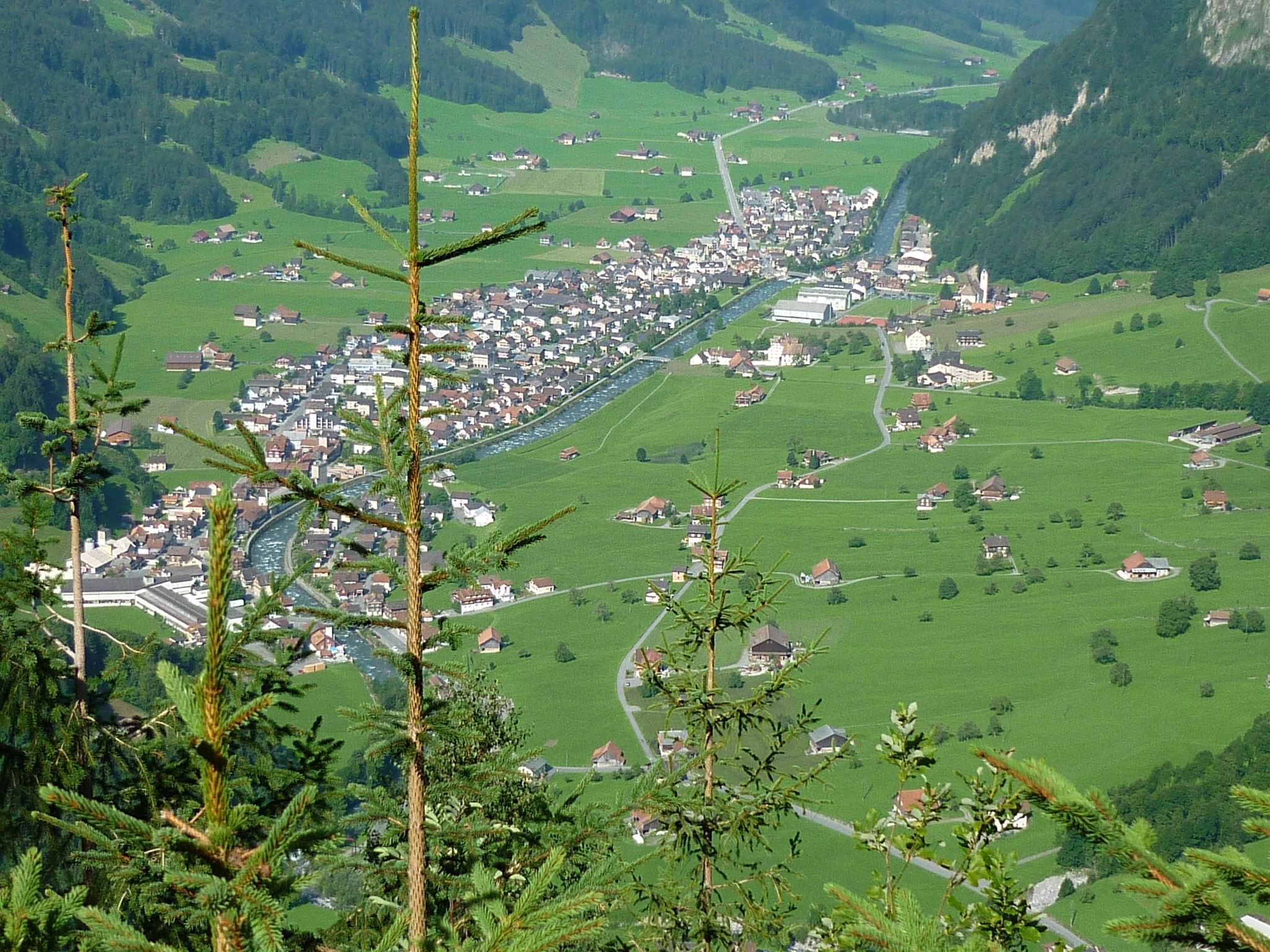
Muotathal, the river Muota in the Muotatal looking west

The village is located in the valley of the river Muota, the Muotatal, with which it shares the name. The municipality is located in a series of valleys on the eastern edge of the canton, on the borders with the cantons of Uri and Glarus. It is the 10th largest municipality area-wise in Switzerland. It consists of the hamlet Ried, village sections of Schachen, Wil, Hinterthal (had its own post office since 1896, though it has now grown together with Schachen), and the hamlet Bisisthal in the Bisistal further upstream of the Muota. It also includes a number of alps (alpine pastures) including Glattalp, Toralp, Charetalp and Goldplangg.

The municipality Muotathal has an area of 172.2 km^{2} (66.5 sq mi) as of 2006. Of this area, 32.8% is used for agricultural purposes, while 22% is forested. Of the rest of the land, 1% is settled (buildings or roads) and the remainder (44.2%) is non-productive (rivers, glaciers or mountains).

The municipality includes the entry site of the Hölloch, which at over 200 km is the longest cave in Switzerland, and currently the second-longest in Europe.

== Demographics ==
Muotathal has a population (as of 31 December 2020) of 3,470. As of 2007, 5.2% of the population was made up of foreign nationals. Over the last 10 years the population has grown at a rate of 0.3%. Most of the population (as of 2000) speaks German (96.5%), with Albanian being second most common ( 2.5%) and Macedonian being third ( 0.3%).

As of 2000 the gender distribution of the population was 52.3% male and 47.7% female. The age distribution, as of 2008, in Muotathal is; 1,069 people or 30.5% of the population is between 0 and 19. 1,017 people or 29.0% are 20 to 39, and 972 people or 27.7% are 40 to 64. The senior population distribution is 251 people or 7.2% are 65 to 74. There are 148 people or 4.2% who are 70 to 79 and 50 people or 1.43% of the population who are over 80.

As of 2000 there are 1,154 households, of which 246 households (or about 21.3%) contain only a single individual. 154 or about 13.3% are large households, with at least five members.

In the 2007 election the most popular party was the SVP which received 67.4% of the vote. The next three most popular parties were the CVP (22%), the SPS (5.1%) and the FDP (4.5%).

In Muotathal about 46.9% of the population (between age 25-64) have completed either non-mandatory upper secondary education or additional higher education (either university or a Fachhochschule).

Muotathal has an unemployment rate of 0.67%. As of 2005, there were 303 people employed in the primary economic sector and about 119 businesses involved in this sector. 512 people are employed in the secondary sector and there are 51 businesses in this sector. 414 people are employed in the tertiary sector, with 82 businesses in this sector.

From the 2000 census, 3,197 or 91.2% are Roman Catholic, while 47 or 1.3% belonged to the Swiss Reformed Church. Of the rest of the population, there are 14 individuals (or about 0.40% of the population) who belong to the Orthodox Church. There are 133 (or about 3.79% of the population) who are Islamic. There are less than 5 individuals who belong to another church (not listed on the census), 34 (or about 0.97% of the population) belong to no church, are agnostic or atheist, and 81 individuals (or about 2.31% of the population) did not answer the question.

The historical population is given in the following table:

year	population
1850	1,680
1900	2,221
1950	2,475
1970	2,763
1980	3,056
1985	3,147
1990	3,152
2000	3,556
2005	3,543
2007	3,556

== Weather ==
Muotathal has an average of 157.8 days of rain per year and on average receives 2,040 mm (80 in) of precipitation. The wettest month is June during which time Muotathal receives an average of 232 mm (9.1 in) of precipitation. During this month there is precipitation for an average of 15.9 days. The driest month of the year is October with an average of 126 mm (5.0 in) of precipitation over 15.9 days.

== Gallery ==
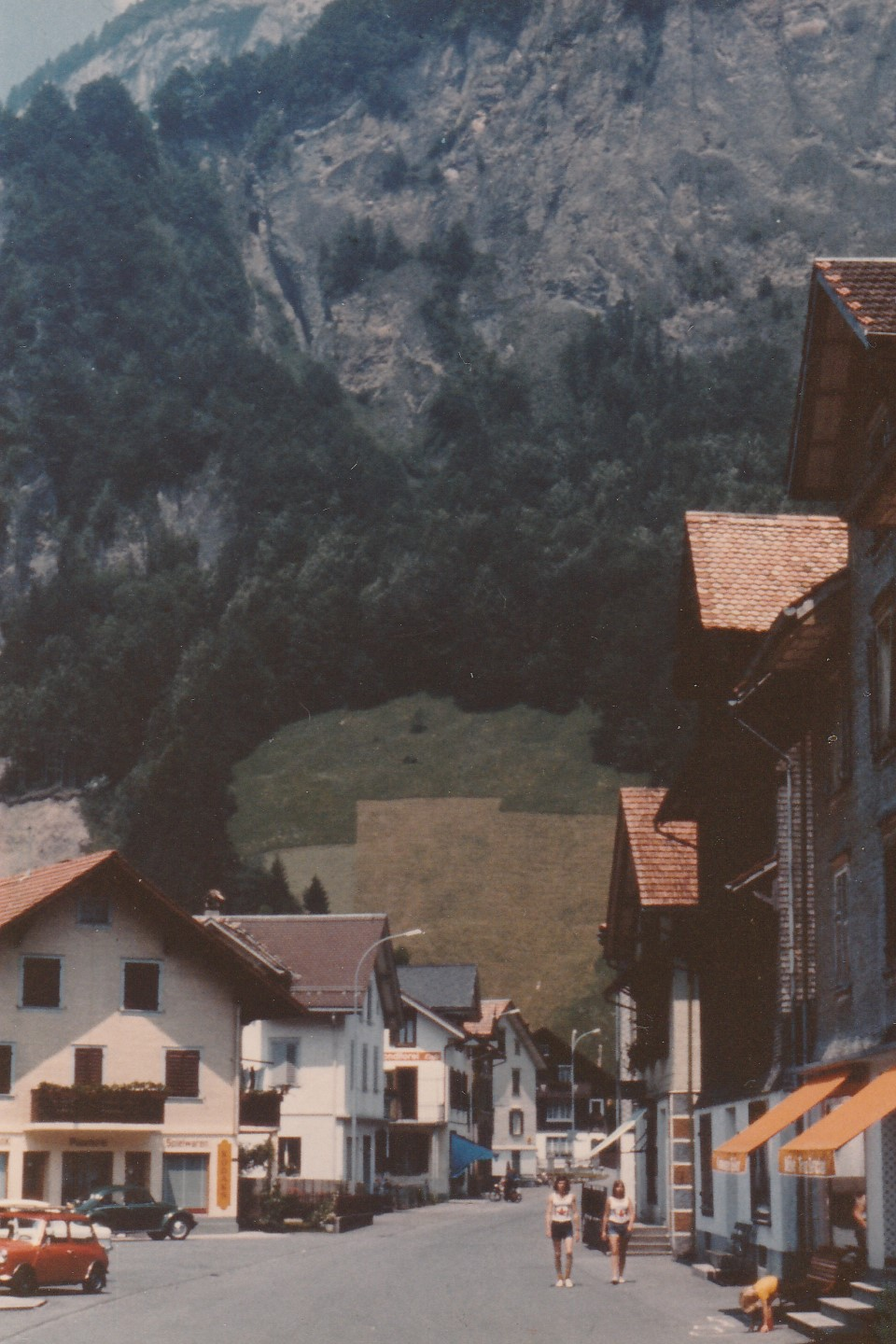
Muotathal during the 1973 ICF Canoe Slalom World Championships

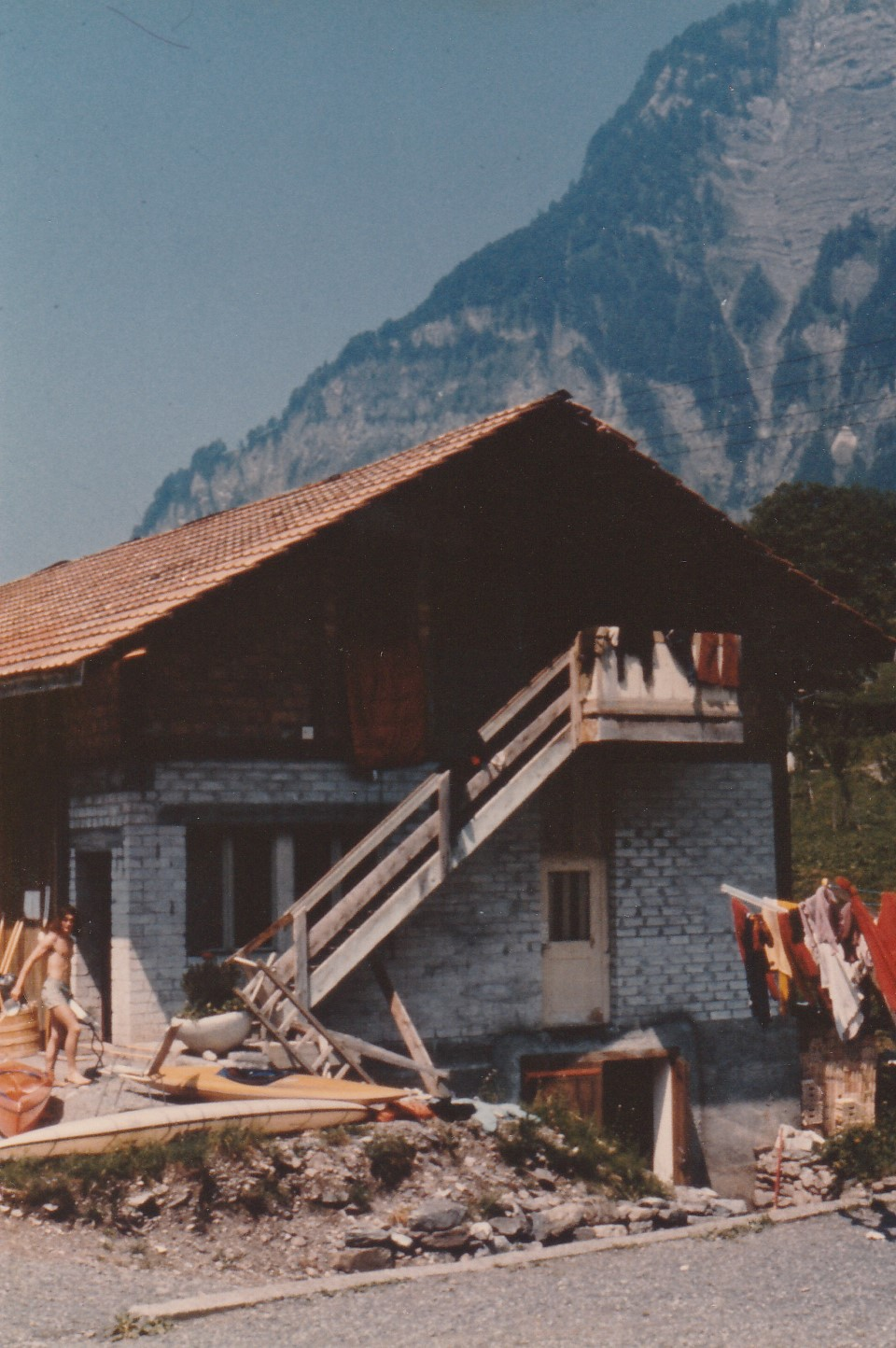
Muotathal in 1973

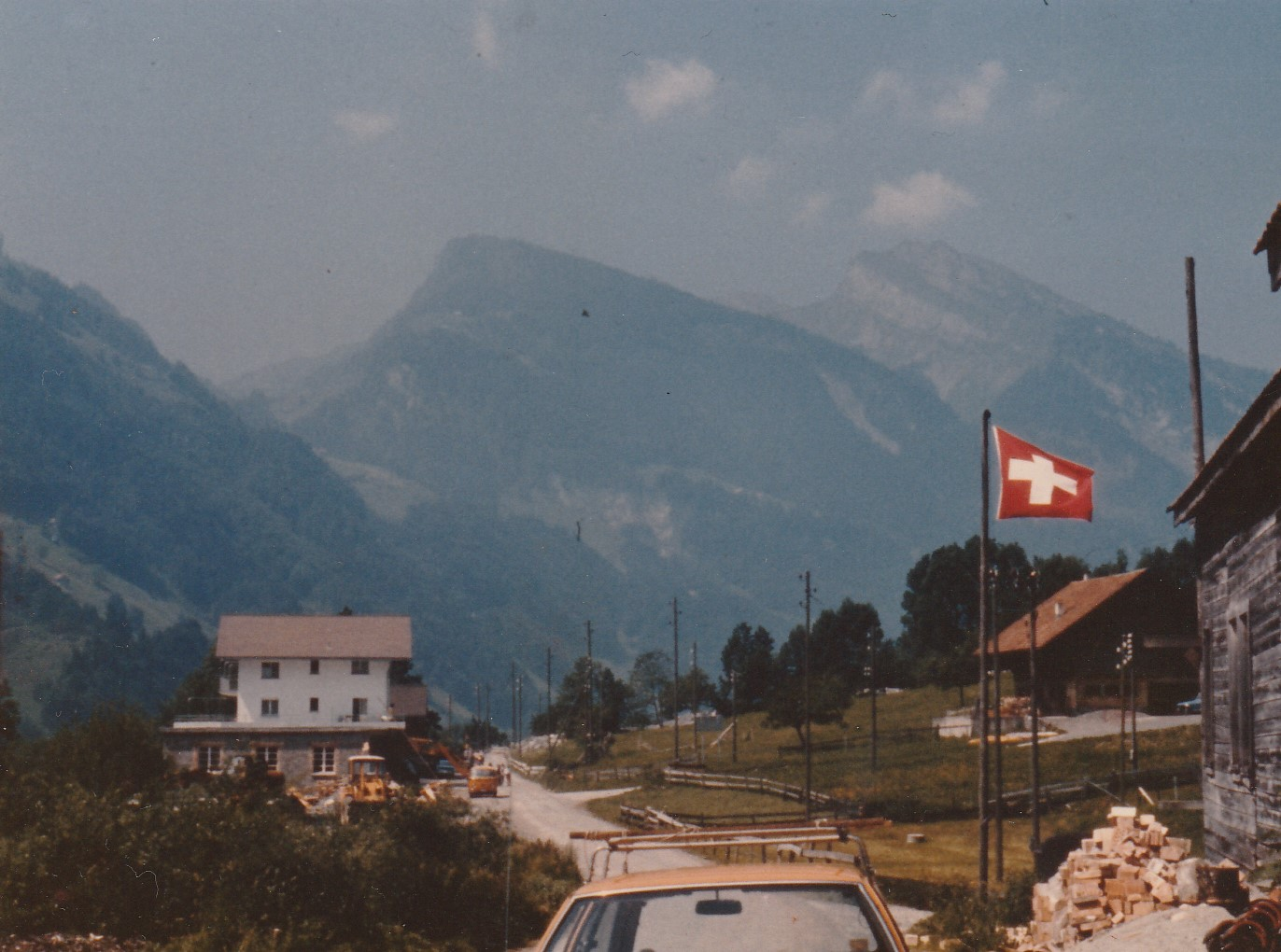
Muotathal in 1973

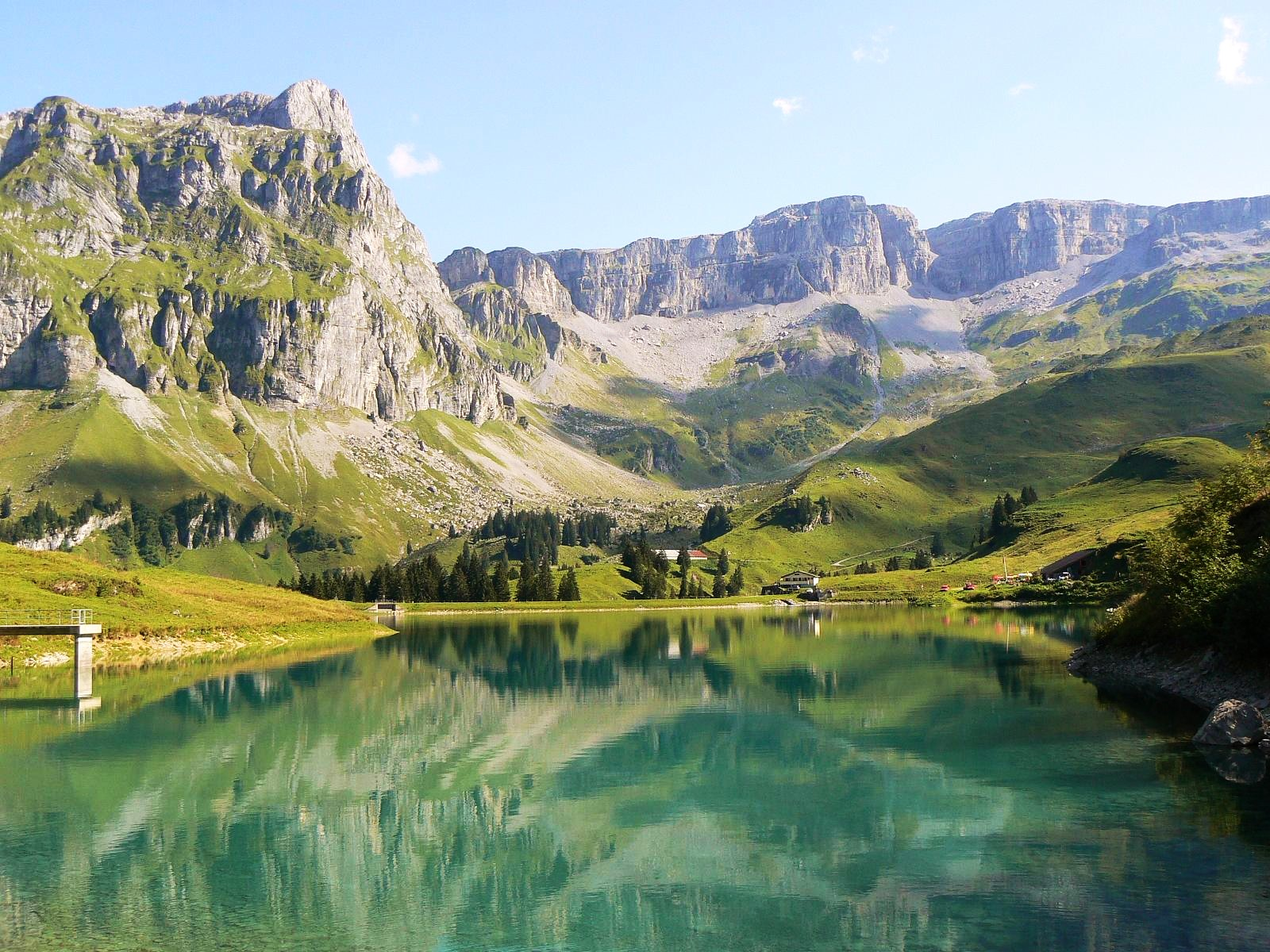
Lake Waldisee in the Bisistal southeast of Mutothal north of the Glatten mountain

Aerial view (1958)
