= Okada =

Okada (written: 岡田 literally "hill rice-paddy") is a Japanese surname. Notable people with the name include:

- Okada Beisanjin (岡田 米山人, 1744–1820), Japanese painter
- Doris Okada Matsui, American politician of the Democratic Party
- Hankō Okada (岡田 半江, 1782–1846), Japanese painter in the Edo period
- Harumitsu Okada (岡田 晴光, born 1960), Japanese cyclist
- Hiroko Okada (岡田 裕子, born 1970), Japanese contemporary artist
- Okada Izō (岡田 以蔵, 1838–1865), Japanese samurai and assassin
- Jisaku Okada (岡田 次作, 1893–1942), IJN Captain
- John Okada (1923–1971), Japanese-American writer
- Junichi Okada (岡田 准一, born 1980), Japanese singer and actor
- Junko Okada (岡田 純子, born 1973), Japanese voice actress
- Katsuya Okada (岡田 克也, born 1953), former Democratic Party of Japan president and foreign minister of Japan
- Kazuchika Okada (岡田 和睦, born 1987), Japanese professional wrestler
- Kazuo Okada (岡田 和生, born 1942), Japanese businessman and billionaire, the biggest project of whom is Okada Manila (see below)
- Keisuke Okada (岡田 啓介, 1868–1952), 31st Prime Minister of Japan
- Kinya Okada (岡田 欣也, born 1992), Japanese professional wrestler
- Kōyō Okada (岡田 紅陽, 1895–1972), Japanese photographer
- Mari Okada (岡田 麿里, born 1976), Japanese screenwriter
- Masaki Okada (岡田 将生, born 1989), Japanese actor
- Masumi Okada (1935–2006), Japanese-Danish actor
- Mokichi Okada (岡田 茂吉, 1882–1955), founder of the Church of World Messianity
- Nana Okada (岡田 奈々, born 1959), Japanese actress and former idol singer
- Nana Okada (岡田 奈々, born 1997), Japanese idol, model and actress
- Rana Okada (岡田 良菜, born 1991), Japanese snowboarder
- Okada Saburōsuke (岡田 三郎助, 1869–1939), Japanese painter
- Satoru Okada (岡田 智, born 1947), general manager of Nintendo Research & Engineering
- Okada Shigetaka (岡田 重孝, died 1584), Japanese Samurai
- Okada Shinichirō (岡田 信一郎, 1883–1932), Japanese architect
- Shoken Okada (岡田 昌憲, born 1947), Japanese slalom canoeist
- Tadahiko Okada (岡田 忠彦, 1878–1958), Japanese politician
- Tadayuki Okada (岡田 忠之, born 1967), former Grand Prix motorcycle racing and Superbike racing motorcycle racer
- Takeshi Okada (岡田 武史, born 1956), coach of the Japan national football team
- Tasuku Okada (岡田 資, 1890–1949), Japanese general
- Tokihiko Okada (岡田 時彦, 1903–1934), Japanese actor
- Tomohiro Okada (岡田 智博, born 1971), Japanese new media art and design curator
- Toshio Okada (岡田 斗司夫, born 1958), founder of the anime company Gainax
- Ty Okada (born 1999), American football player
- Yaichirō Okada (岡田 彌一郎, 1892–1976), Japanese zoologist
- Yoshiko Okada (岡田 嘉子, 1902–1992), Japanese actress
- Yuki Okada (disambiguation), multiple people
- Yukiko Okada (岡田 有希子, 1967–1986), Japanese idol
- Yusuke Okada (disambiguation), multiple people

== Other uses ==
- Okada Air, a now defunct airline in Nigeria
- Okada Domain, a Japanese domain in the Edo period
- Okada Museum of Art, an art museum in Kanagawa, Japan
- Okada Manila, a casino resort and hotel complex in Parañaque City, Metro Manila which is the biggest project of Kazuo Okada (see above)
- Okada (motorcycle taxi), a motorcycle taxi used in western Africa
- Okada (Nigeria) a Nigerian town
- Okada Station (Ehime), a railway station in Ehime, Japan
- Okada Station (Kagawa), a railway station in Kagawa, Japan
