= D'Angelo (surname) =

D'Angelo (also spelled DiAngelo or Di Angelo) is an Italian surname. People with the surname include:

- Adam D'Angelo (b. 1984), American internet entrepreneur
- Andrew D'Angelo (b. 1965), American jazz musician
- Angelo D'Angelo (footballer) (b. 1985), Italian footballer
- Angelo D'Angelo (actor), Australian actor
- Beverly D'Angelo (b. 1951), American actress
- Carlo D'Angelo (1919–1973), Italian actor
- Charlene (singer), full name Charlene Marilynn D'Angelo (b. 1950), American singer
- Charles D'Angelo (b. 1985), American personal development coach
- Chico d'Ângelo (b. 1953), Brazilian politician
- Eduardo D'Angelo (1939–2015), Uruguayan actor
- Ernesto Pérez d'Angelo (1932–2013), Chilean paleontologist
- Francesco d'Angelo (1446–1488), Italian sculptor
- Frank D'Angelo (b. 1959), Canadian beverage industry entrepreneur
- Gianfranco D'Angelo (1936–2021), Italian actor
- Gianna D'Angelo (1929–2013), American soprano
- Giuseppe D'Angelo (disambiguation), various people
- Héctor D'Angelo, Argentine retired football player and manager
- Ivan D'Angelo (b. 1990/1991), Italian footballer
- Jacopo d'Angelo (1360–1411), Italian humanist
- José D'Angelo (b. 1989), Argentine footballer
- Josephine D'Angelo (1924–2013), American baseball player
- Louis D'Angelo (1888–1958), American bass-baritone
- Luca D'Angelo (b. 1971), Italian football manager
- Mario d'Angelo (b. 1954), French academic
- Matt Di Angelo (b. 1987), British actor
- Mike D'Angelo (b. 1968), American film critic
- Mirella D'Angelo (b. 1956), Italian actress
- Nino D'Angelo (b. 1957), Italian singer
- Roberto D'Angelo (b. 1945), Italian canoeist
- Robin DiAngelo (b. 1956), American author
- Sabrina D'Angelo (b. 1993), Canadian soccer player
- Salvo D'Angelo (1909–1989), Italian film producer
- Santo D'Angelo (b. 1995), Italian footballer
- Sebastián D'Angelo (b. 1989), Argentine footballer
- Sharlee D'Angelo (b. 1973), bassist of Swedish melodic death metal band Arch Enemy
- Victoria Scott D'Angelo, second wife of Chuck Yeager
- Vincenzo D'Angelo (1951–2008), Italian water-polo player

== See also ==
- D'Angelo (given name)
