= Max Hinsche =

German naturalist, writer and hunter (1896–1939)

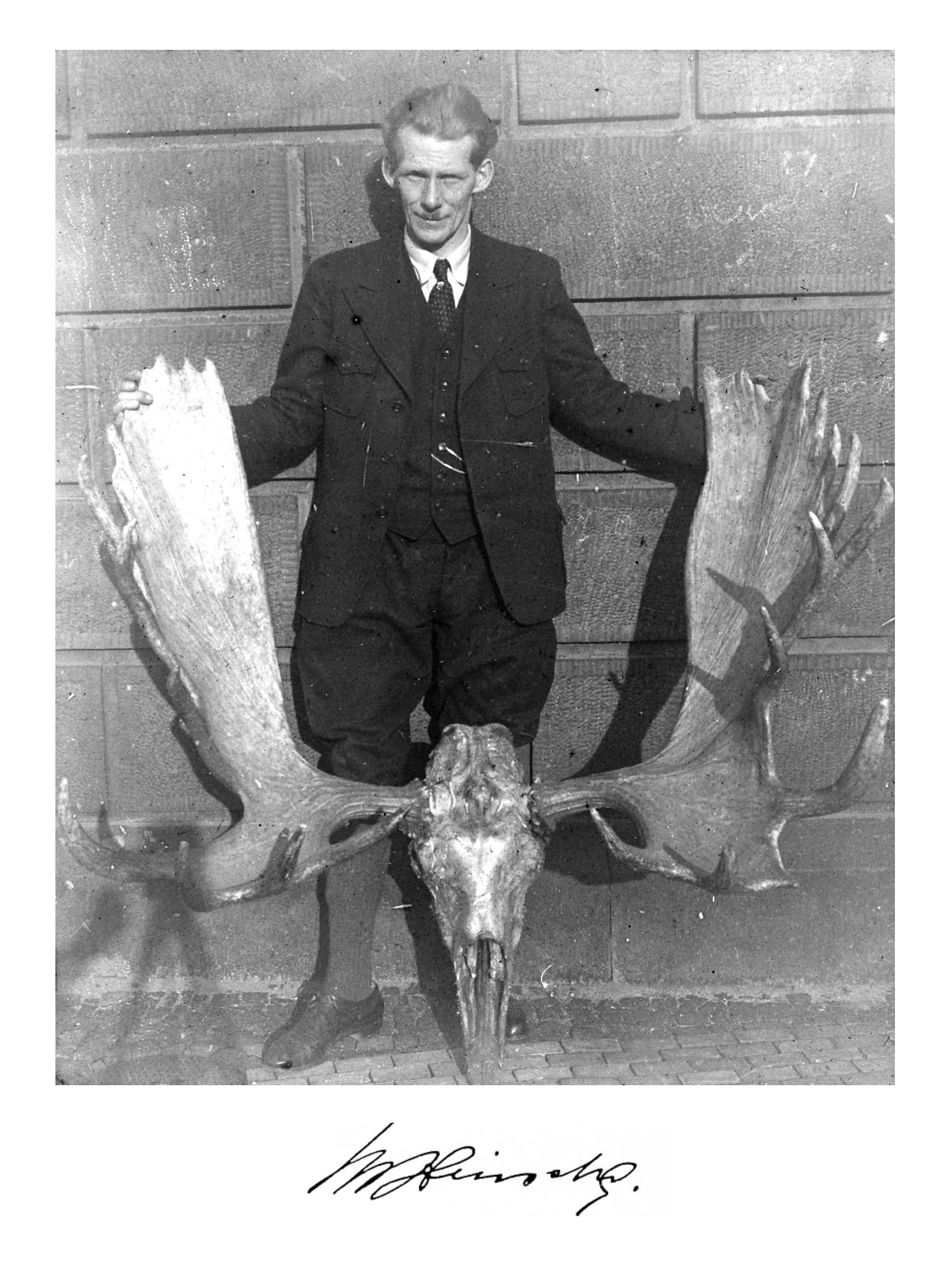
- Born: 2 May 1896; Radeberg, Germany
- Died: 23 November 1939 (aged 43); Rottenmann, Styra, Austria
- Resting place: Cemetery Rottenmann, Styra, Austria
- Citizenship: Germany
- Spouse: Frieda Hinsche
- Scientific career
- Fields: German natural scientist and writer, taxidermist, dermoplasticist, big game hunter, trapper,
- Institutions: Germany, Canada / Alberta, Yukon Territory

Max Hinsche (2 May 1896 - 23 November 1939) was a German taxidermist, who also worked in the field of dermoplastics. He was a big game hunter, a trapper, a natural scientist and a writer.

The Staatliche Museen für Tierkunde und Völkerkunde Dresden (State Museums of Zoology and Ethnology Dresden) assigned Hinsche the task to explore Alberta and the Yukon Territory in Canada, an almost undiscovered territory at that time. He had to collect and preserve rare and previously unknown mammals and birds. Hinsche explored the areas for nine years, from 1926 to 1935. He described his results and experiences, all of them scientifically based, in his book Kanada wirklich erlebt (Canada – really experienced); The first edition was published by J. Neumann, Neudamm and Berlin 1938, with 30 art prints and a map.

== Biography ==
Hinsche, born in Radeberg, was the first child of the wheelwright Wilhelm Hinsche (born 1872 in Zörbig; died 1946 in Radeberg) and his wife Agnes, née Leuschner (born 1874 in Steinölsa; died 1909 in Radeberg). He had three siblings. After his mother's early death, his father married Ernestine Pauline Roitsch, née Neugebauer (born 1876, Strehlen; died 1965, Radeberg), a woman who already had two children. (Note: The weekly Radeberger newspaper ran a 9 part series on Hinsche, starting on 17 January 2014. The articles were compiled into a final PDF)

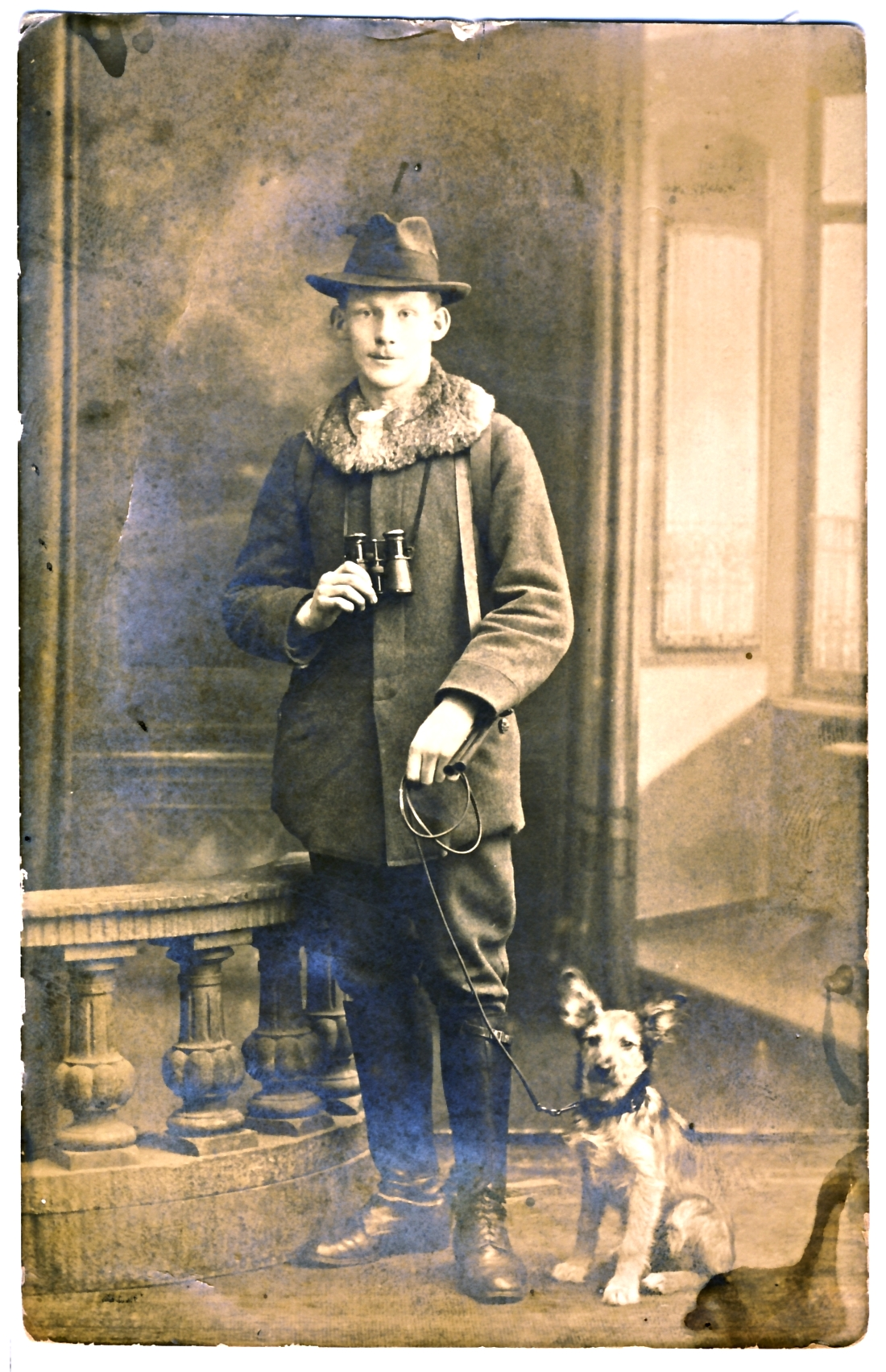
Max Hinsche 1914

From 1902 to 1910, Max Hinsche attended the boys' school in Radeberg (today Pestalozzischule Radeberg Oberschule). He was considered 'scientifically gifted', and he was absorbed in collecting small animals and birds with their eggs, a favorite leisure pursuit at that time. In this way, he also developed his skills of taxidermy. Early in is life, he was enthralled by reading reports of the gold rush in Canada and Alaska, and he dreamed of going there. He wanted to become a forester or a hunter after finishing school, but his parents weren't able to afford the occupational training. As a result, he served an apprenticeship in sheet glass working, and he got his master craftsman's diploma at the age of 18. During the First World War, in 1915, he was called up for military service, and he went into the infantry of Königlich Sächsisches 16. Infanterie Regiment Nr. 182 (Royal Saxon 16 Infantry Regiment no 182), the so-called Freiberger. The fierce battles on the Western front shaped his world view. In August 1916, he was injured in the battle of the Somme and mustered out. After his recovery, he worked in his trade again. In May 1919, he married Emma Frieda, née Horst (1896–1979) from Bautzen. In December 1919, his first daughter Lieselotte was born, followed in 1936 by his second daughter Annegret.

Hinsche suffered more and more from stomach trouble as a result of his hunger and malnutrition; during his 9-year long expedition to Canada. The extreme physical challenges had increasingly damaged his health. In November 1939, while hunting in Styria, he suffered a stomach perforation. Medical aid came too late, and Hinsche died in hospital in Rottenmann, Styria on November 23, 1939.

== Work ==
=== Early scientific work ===
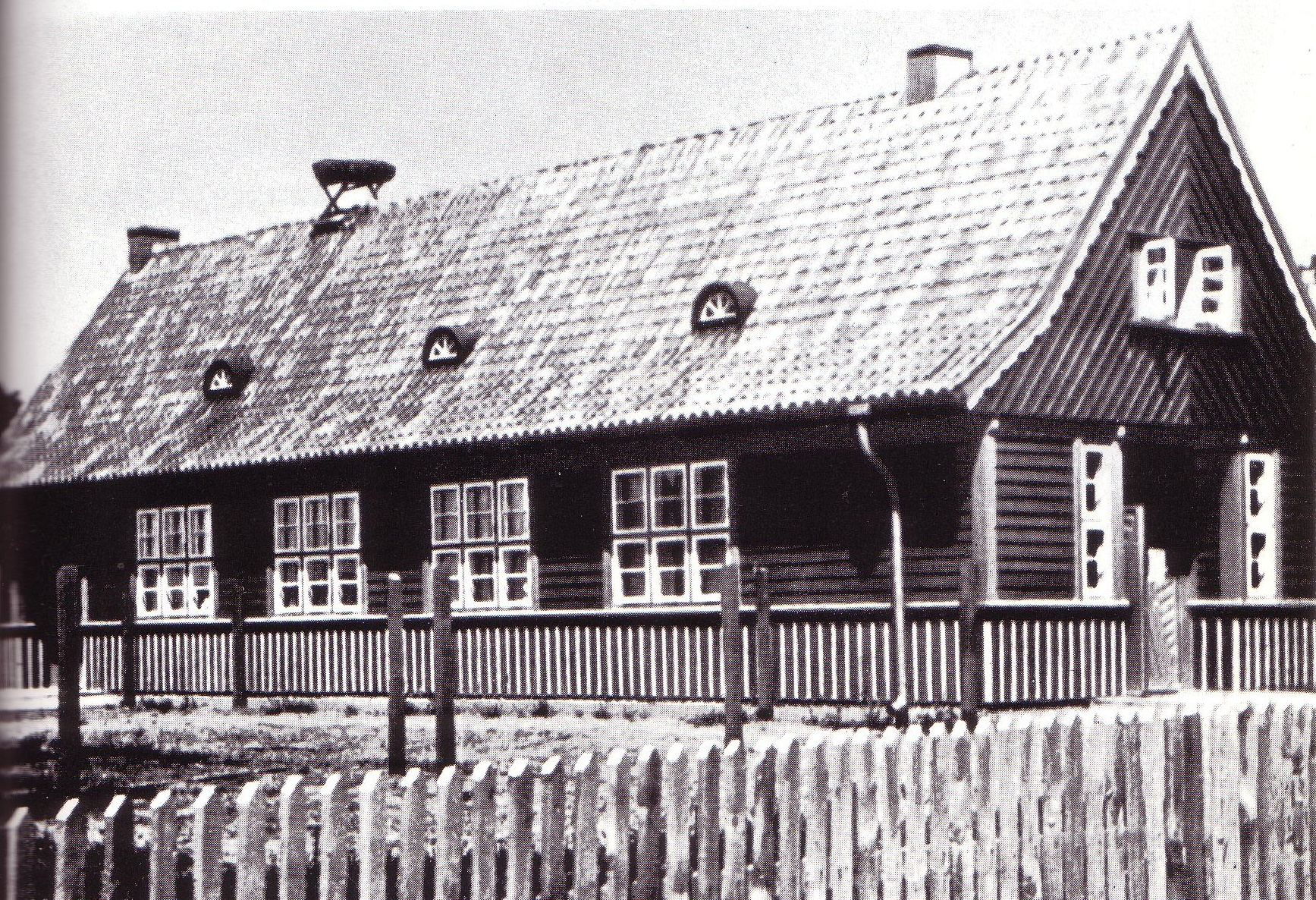
Ornithological Institute of Rossitten, um 1920

Hinsche worked as a taxidermist in his free time, and that was also his second job. After the First World War, he had his first contacts with Staatliche Museen für Tierkunde Dresden (State Museums of Zoology Dresden). Here, he got to know the famous ornithologist Paul Bernhardt. He stayed in scientific contact with him throughout his life. They both applied themselves to nature conservation and the research on bird migration. They put a ring on hundreds of birds (breeding, resting and migrant bird populations) in the core zone of the Radeberg Hüttertal nature reserve at the Ornithological Institute of Helgoland and at the Ornithological Institute of Rossitten/East Prussia. Hinsche and Bernhardt made the film Gefiederte Räuber (Birds of prey). They had been instructed to make such a film by Dresdner FilmFirma A. Linke (Dresden Film-Firm A. Linke) and the Landesverein Sächsischer Heimatschutz (Association of the Protection of the Countryside in Saxony). They filmed in the area around Radeberg, mainly in the valley of Hüttertal. But Hinsche had to make preparations for his Canada-expedition. The State Museum of Zoology Dresden had succeeded in getting the permission of the authorities in Canada for Hinsche to go on a scientific expedition there in order to collect mammals and birds.

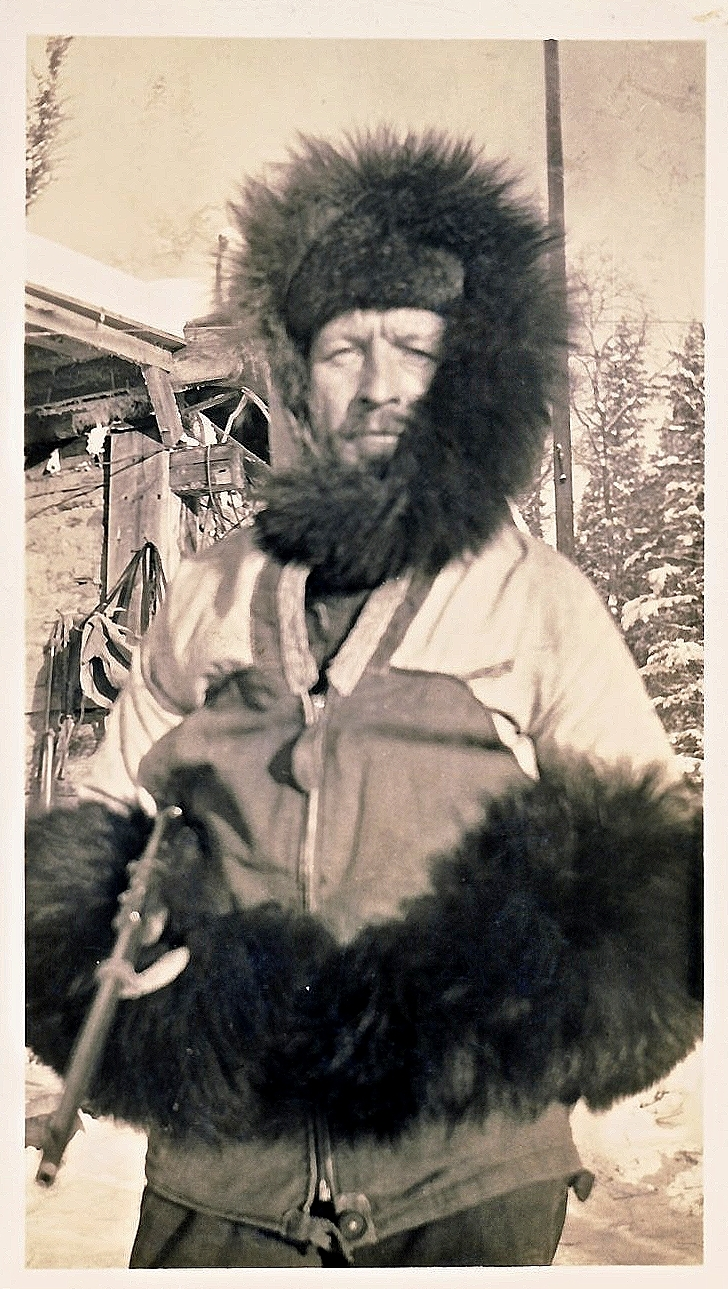
Georg Naumann, Partner of Hinsche

== Expedition to Canada ==
On 26 May 1926, Hinsche got ready for his journey, and he boarded together with his partner Georg Naumann the RMS Empress of France from Hamburg to Quebec, both of them almost without means. Until September 1926, they worked on a farm in Headingly, Manitoba near Winnipeg to earn the necessary money for their equipment to survive in the primeval Canadian forests and to be able to go to the north of the Canadian Alberta, to Athabasca.

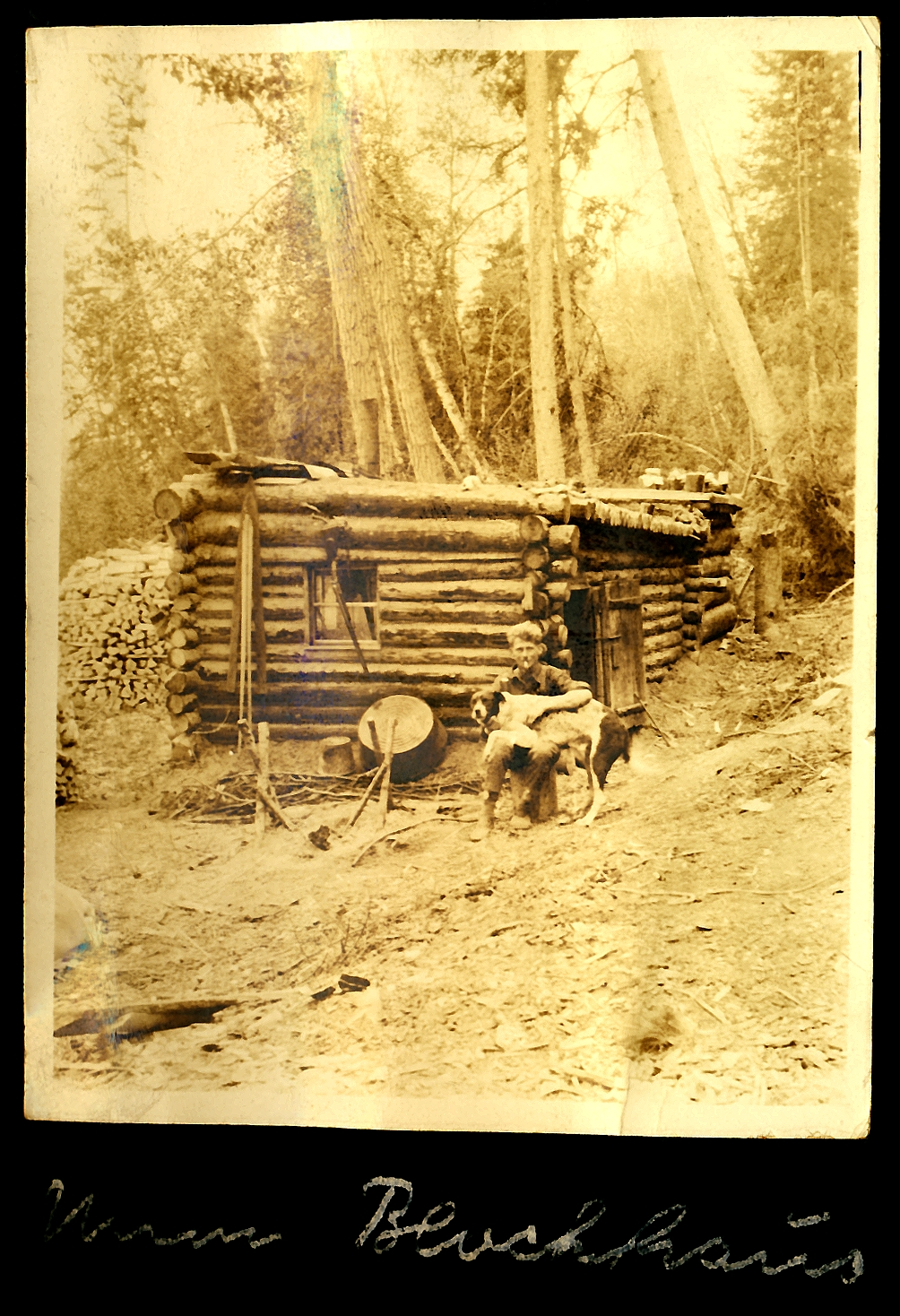
The first log cabin on the Athabasca River

=== Athabasca/Alberta ===
At the beginning of October 1926, they ventured further into the wilderness, and they went approximately 220 kilometres downstream the Athabasca River and northwards, through the rapids of the Pelican-River into the area of Pelican Portage. Together they built a log cabin and lived as trappers. Both of them made their living from the sale of animals' skins. However, they separated from each other after a year because of their economic situation. At the same time, Max Hinsche shot big game, such as moose, bears, deer, elk, lynxes, wolves, foxes, often to survive, and also small mammals and birds, which were still unknown at that time. He prepared and stuffed them then for the Museum of Zoology Dresden. In January 1931, he went to Germany for a short holiday. There he was awarded a gold medal for his stuffed animal of a huge life-size moose (giant elk, Alces alces andersoni) at a hunting exhibition in Berlin on the occasion of "Grüne Woche" (Green week). In June 1931, he returned to Canada. Living there as a trapper and all on his own, he had to face extremely difficult living conditions. Every time he met native descendants of the Indian tribe of the Cree (especially the Plains Cree), his behaviour towards them bore all the marks of brotherly love and willingness to help.

=== Yukon Territory ===
At the end of 1934, he started out for the Yukon-Territory. He had always dreamed of going to that uncharted region where many mountains were still without names. He wanted to hunt there and collect rare species of big game. It can be proved that Hinsche was the first "white hunter" there. Near the ice front of the Kaskawulsh Glacier, at the confluence of the Kaskawulsh River and the Alsek River, he shot dead the Alaska-gigant bear (Kodiak bear, Ursus arctos middendorffi), the only bear of its kind that has been seen in that region up to now and those bears are seldom found on the mainland. That bear was 3 metres high, when placed in an upright position, and had a weight of 500 kilograms. Only in March 2014, its hide, which was prepared for long durability, turned up again. It was identified in "Senckenberg Naturhistorische Sammlungen Dresden, Museum für Tierkunde" (Senckenberg Museum of Natural History Collection Dresden, Museum of Zoology). Prior to this, it had been assumed that the hide was lost due to war damage.

In the mountains and the alpine ice fields of the Yukon Territory, he shot rare mountain sheep, among others Dall sheep (Ovis dalli) and the extremely rare mountain goats (Oreamnos americanus), which can be found only at heights of 3,000 to 5,000 metres, Alaska-Yukon Moose (Alces alces gigas), caribous (Rangifer tarandus) or reindeer, brown bears (Ursus arctos), among them grizzly bears (Ursus arctos horribilis), black bears (Ursus americanus), and American beavers (Castor canadensis). He lived in the Yukon Territory for almost one year, most of the time as a nomad, equipped with a simple tent. He had to survive temperatures of down to −60 °C (−76 °F), and similar forces of nature.

In that time, he went out on expeditions to the Kaskawulsh River, into the McArthur Mountains. He almost came to the Arctic Circle, to the Malaspina Glacier and the Kluene Lake. When asked by the Canadian authorities, Hinsche worked out a list of wild animals on the basis of his scientific observations for the authorities in Whitehorse. He also put necessary proposals forward for protecting those animals. Some years later, a part of that huge area was protected by law, which was the basis of the (Kluane National Park and Reserve of Canada), founded in 1976.

== Back in Germany ==
At the end of December 1934, Hinsche's residence permit expired. In February 1935, he went back to Germany, to his home town Radeberg. Back in Germany after 9 years, he was confronted with a country that bore all the marks of National Socialism. With the help of the government of Saxony, the Museum of Zoology Dresden bought a large part of the valuable and rare items of Hinsche's collection from Canada. In the goods inward inventory of the Museum of Zoology, there are lists of over 130 kinds of animals, trophies and skins of animals, documented by Hinsche, which were all preserved thanks to taxidermy. Many of those exhibits, including extremely valuable and rare species (birds mainly in pairs), survived the Second World War by relocating them to other places. They are currently stored in the Museum of Zoology, Dresden (Senckenberg Museum of Natural History Collection).

Already in September 1935, Hinsche's longing for living in harmony with nature became more and more intense again. He also wanted to get away from the notorious Gauleiter and Reich Governor Martin Mutschmann, who wanted to use Hinsche and his popularity for questionable purposes. His retreat was the Saxon Switzerland, the frontier area of the Bohemian Switzerland. There, he went to Hinterdaubitz and the area around Reinhardtsdorf, where he worked as a manager of a hunting ground.

== Romania / Transylvania ==
A year later, Hinsche got an offer from one of the heirs of the Kaufhaus Renner department store in Dresden to work as a manager of his hunting ground in the Carpathian Mountains in Transylvania. Hinsche started his new job in August 1936. That hunting ground in the Carpathians, south of Mühlbach (district Alba Iulia) between Surian-Mühlbacher Gebirge and Zibinsgebirge, extended over an area of about 300 square kilometres and up to altitudes of over 2,200 metres above sea level. He worked there for over a year. During that time, he traveled via Bucharest to the Black Sea and into the bird paradise of Dobrudscha. He succeeded in collecting rare bird skins, among them white-tailed eagle (Haliaeetus albicilla), eastern imperial eagle (Aquila heliaca), various species of vulture (Aegypiinae), great bustard (Otis tarda), western capercaillie (Tetrao urogallus) and others.

During the time in the Carpathians, he also worked on his manuscript for his book Kanada wirklich erlebt (Canada really experienced), which was first published in 1938.

== Return to Radeberg ==
Hinsche returned to Radeberg in October 1937. In January 1938, he was honored by the Museum of Zoology Dresden with a special display of his most beautiful and valuable skins and stuffed animals, which were highly appreciated by experts. One of Hinsche's friends, the owner of a manor in Kleinwolmsdorf Hans Fleischer (1892–1967), hired him to work as a game keeper in his hunting ground in Karlswald (a large forest area near Arnsdorf). He provided him with a sufficient income in addition to his work as a taxidermist. In Radeberg, Hinsche was engaged in his trade as a taxidermist on his plot of land Kleinwolmsdorfer Straße 7. He described himself as a specialist for hunting trophies with 25-year-experience at home and abroad in his company publications. He also gave instructions in trophy preservation and their maintenance. After his return from Canada, Hinsche was also engaged in publishing and giving lectures to experts, and to the public as well.

Hinsche wielded lasting influence on generations of interested young people. He aroused their interest in the job of a taxidermist and the art of dermoplastics. One of them was the later famous entomologist Werner Heinz Muche (1911–1987) from Radeberg. Because Hinsche wasn't good at doing business, Muche took on the job of selling rare species, skins and trophies to museums, institutes and universities, among others to the University of Forestry Eberswalde and to the collection of Julius Riemer (1880–1959) in Wittenberg.

== Styria ==
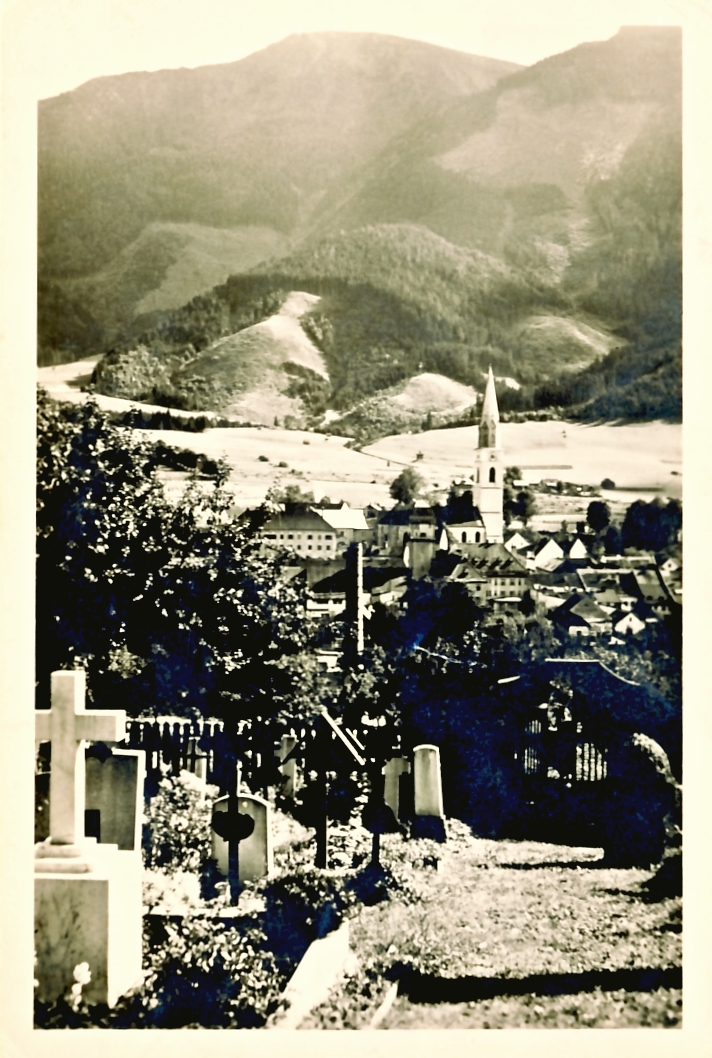
Rottenmann/Styria, Hinsche's final resting place

In 1939, Max Hinsche's state of health got worse. He often suffered from stomach trouble after his years full of privation in Canada. He didn't follow his friends' advice to undergo an operation and accepted one of his hunting friend's invitation to work as a forest warden in Styria. He was particularly determined to shoot a special kind of chamois to complete his collection. In November 1939, he went to Rottenmann in Styria. From there, he climbed through the mountains to hunt. He succeeded in shooting a chamois, but he suffered from a stomach perforation due to the strenuous climbing in a challenging mountainous wilderness. Help came too late, and Hinsche died at the age of 43 in a hospital in Rottenmann, Styria, Austria. He was buried at the cemetery in Rottenmann.

== Appreciation ==
Hinsche's pioneering work on the exploration of the northern Alberta and the Yukon Territory was greatly appreciated. He was acknowledged as the first explorer and collector of zoological objects in those regions. He described his observations as a trapper, a big-game hunter and a taxidermist together with his conclusions in the book 'Kanada wirklich erlebt' (Canada – really experienced). Hinsche's original diaries with his daily notes and other written documents from his time in Alberta are stored in the archive of Schloss Klippenstein (Castle Klippenstein) in Radeberg.

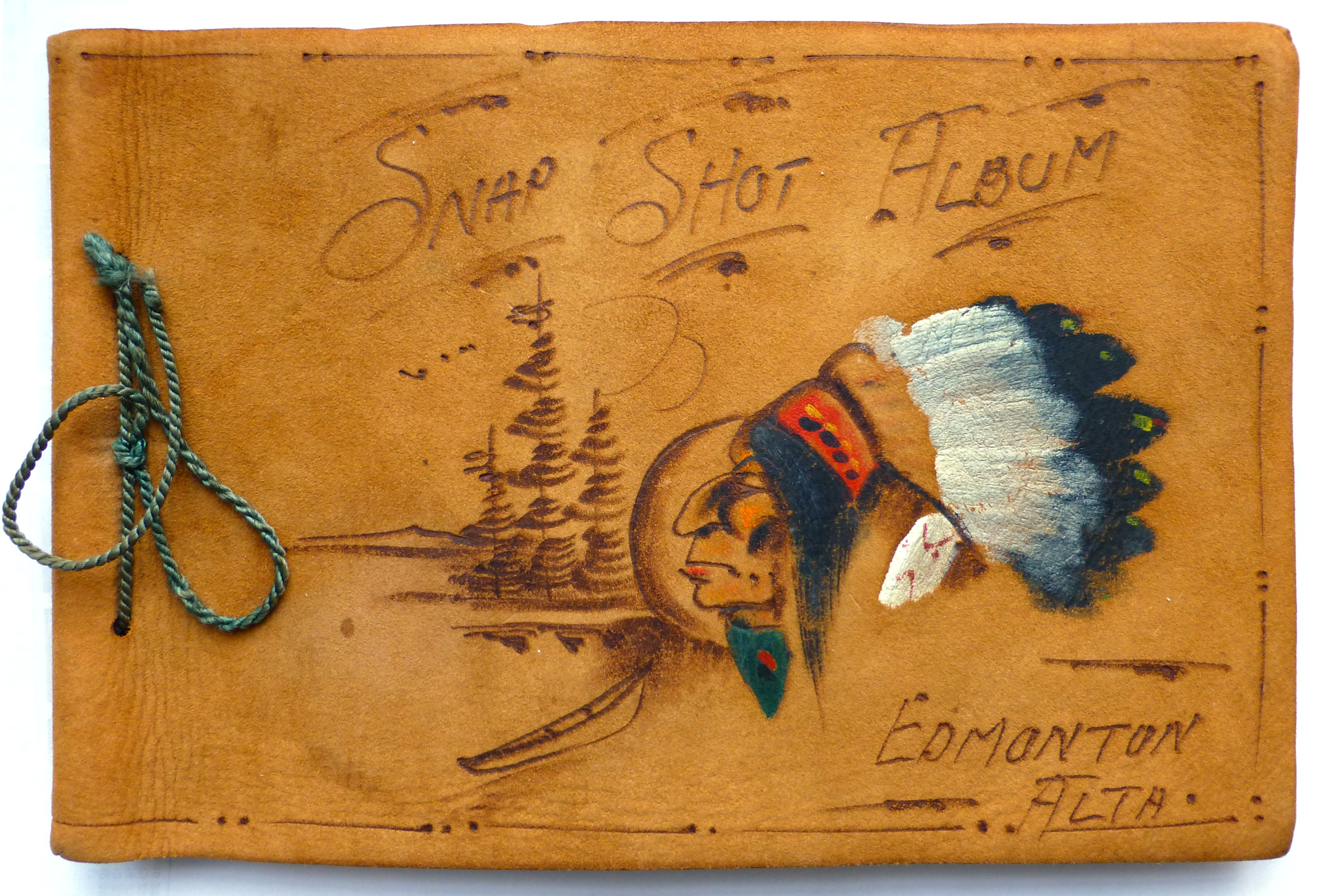
Hinsche's self-made photo album made of moose, c. 1931

Hinsche's photo album with a lot of photos (in private ownership) and his collections reflect his hard life under extreme conditions in the far north of Canada from 1926 to 1936. They are of remarkably good quality, considering Hinsche's conditions of life. Most of his stuffed animals, among them species of mammals and birds from the Canadian wilderness that have died out there today, are in top condition as well. Items of Hinsche's collection can be found in the Museum of Zoology Dresden (Senckenberg Museum of Natural History Collection), Naturkundemuseum Leipzig (Museum of Nature Study), in Berlin, Basel, Rome, in the Julius-Riemer-Museum in Lutherstadt Wittenberg (Luther's Town of Wittenberg), in the University of Forestry Eberswalde, in the Museum Schloss Klippenstein in Radeberg (Castle Klippenstein), in Pestalozzischule Radeberg, to name only a few. Hinsche's observations and analyses of the behaviour of wolves (Canis lupus) are highly informative for today's scientists, too. Scientists of the University of Calgary refer to Hinsche's important discoveries in their current studies of the reintegration of wolves that live in the wilderness into cultivated and inhabited areas.

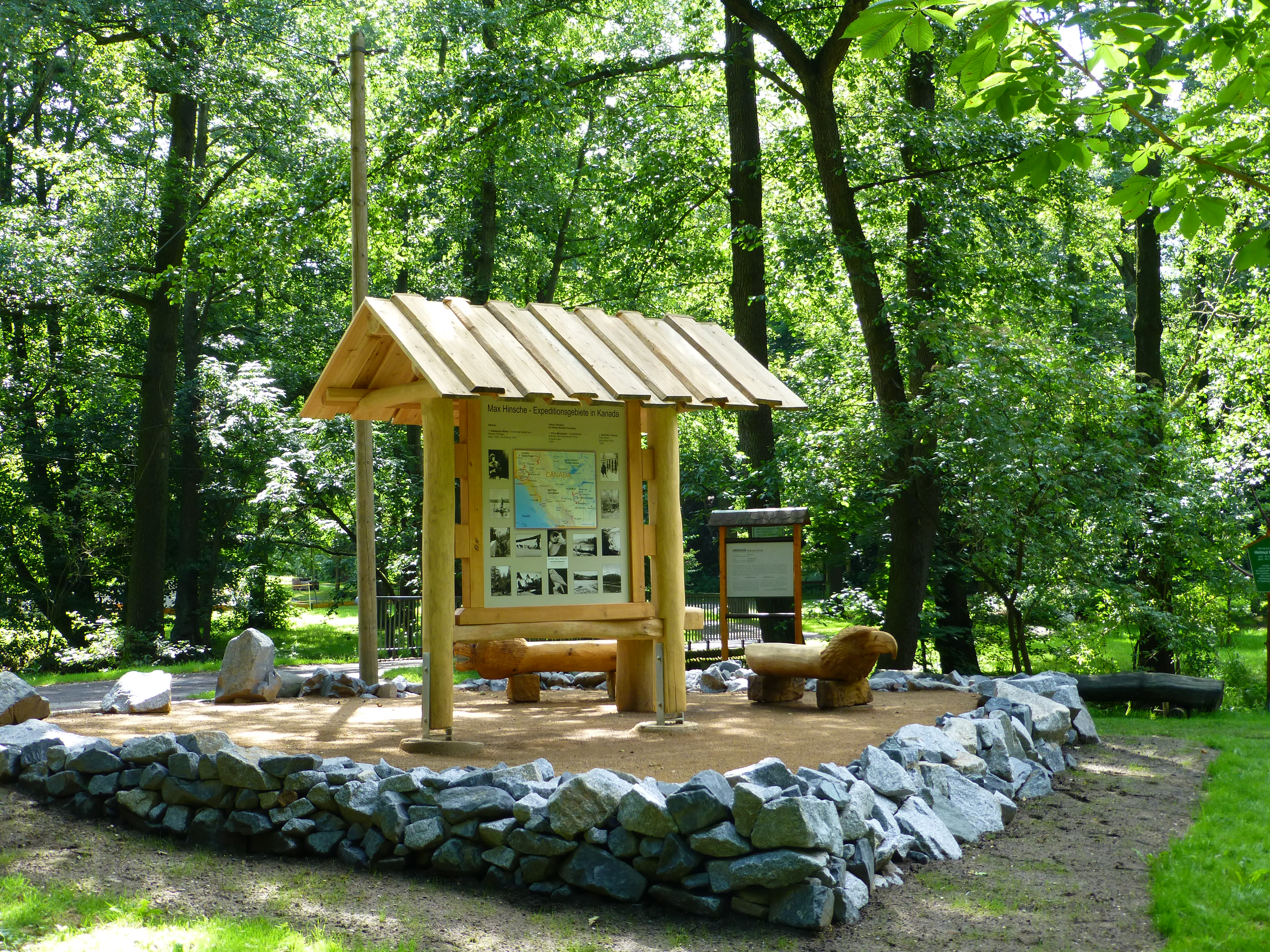
Memorial grove for Max Hinsche in the Radeberger Hüttertal

In 2014, members of the study group 'History of the town of Radeberg' delved into Hinsche's life and work. He was almost forgotten then. These studies resulted in publishing the book "Traum von Kanada – Traum von Freiheit. Das Leben des Max Hinsche". Soon after that, "Förderverein Hüttertal e.V." (association for supporting) took the initiative and put up a memorial site to honor him. The memorial is known as 'Max-Hinsche-Hain' in Hüttertal (valley) Radeberg. The opening ceremony and with it Hinsche's work and life were honorably mentioned in many publications.
