= EDI =

EDI may refer to:

== Government ==
- European Deterrence Initiative, a US military program in Europe
- Federal Department of Home Affairs (German: Eidgenössisches Departement des Innern), the Swiss interior ministry
- The Economist Democracy Index, classifying states

== Media ==
- Edi (film), a 2002 Polish film
- EDI (Mass Effect), a character in the original Mass Effect trilogy

== People ==
- Edi (given name)
- E.D.I. Mean (born 1974), American rapper
- Guy Edi (born 1988), Ivorian-French basketball player

== Places ==
- UCL Eastman Dental Institute, Camden, London, England
- Edinburgh Airport, Scotland (IATA:EDI)
- Edithvale railway station, Melbourne, Australia

== Technology ==
- Electronic data interchange, a data standard
- Electrodeionization, a water purification process
- The Enlightenment IDE, an IDE based upon the Enlightenment Foundation Libraries (EFL) for use with the Enlightenment window manager as part of the Enlightenment minimal desktop/desktop shell environment

== Other uses ==
- Eating Disorder Inventory, a self-report questionnaire
- Equality, diversity, and inclusion (EDI), also called diversity, equity, and inclusion (DEI), an organizational frameworks which seek to promote "the fair treatment and full participation of all people", particularly groups "who have historically been underrepresented or subject to discrimination" on the basis of identity or disability.
  - Equality, Diversity and Inclusion, an academic journal on these topics
- Evans-Deakin Industries, a former Australian engineering company
