= Slimming club =

British diet groups

Slimming clubs are support groups to encourage weight loss through healthy diet and fitness. Known as lifestyle weight management programmes, slimming clubs have been recommended by the National Health Service in the UK since 2007.

Public slimming clubs are typically commercial ventures and are distinct from non-profit clinical groups, which are usually short-term in nature, and twelve-step groups such as Overeaters Anonymous, which address food addictions. Some firms cover the membership fees for their employees, if health is an issue or employees are required to fit in small spaces.

Weight Watchers, one of the most popular slimming clubs, was founded in the United States in 1961, when housewife Jean Nidetch began a support group at her home in Queens. In the UK, Slimming World was founded in Derbyshire in 1969. Rosemary Conley founded another British slimming club, which is now online only.

In the UK, women are much more likely to join clubs though there is a higher rate of obesity among men; the notion that weight loss is a feminist issue has led to a demand for all-male clubs.

In British popular culture, slimming clubs featured in the television sketch comedy Little Britain as well as the television series Fat Friends, which was turned into a musical.

== See also ==
- Weight loss camp
- Weight loss coaching
