= Dubravko Mataković =

Dubravko Mataković may refer to:

- Dubravko Mataković (canoeist) (1942–2019), Yugoslav slalom canoeist
- Dubravko Mataković (illustrator) (born 1959), Croatian illustrator best known for his grotesque comic books
