= Friedrich Gaukel =

- Born: 7 June 1785; Württemberg
- Died: 8 November 1853 (aged 68); Berlin, Canada West
- Burial place: First Mennonite Cemetery, Kitchener, Ontario
- Other names: Frederick Gaukel
- Spouses: Polly Kaufman; Maria Roschang (died 1834): Dorothea Weismiller
- Children: 8

Friedrich Gaukel (9 June 1784 or 7 June 1785 – 8 November 1853), also known as Frederick Gaukel, was a German-Canadian farmer, distiller, and innkeeper. He was born in Württemberg in what is now the Federal Republic of Germany. He immigrated first to Pennsylvania in the United States and later to Waterloo Township in Upper Canada, now the Canadian province of Ontario. He was instrumental in the early growth and establishment of Berlin, Ontario (now known as Kitchener), of which he has been described as a "prominent founder". He operated an early tavern and inn (Note: The German term Wirtshaus is sometimes used.) near the site of the later Walper Hotel at the corner of King Street and Queen Street in downtown Kitchener. His donation of land to build a county courthouse and jail allowed Berlin to become the seat of Waterloo County, accelerating its urban development and growth toward becoming a city.

== Biography ==
=== Early life ===
Friedrich Gaukel was born on either 9 June 1784 or 7 June 1785 in Württemberg. At the time, Württemberg was ruled by a duchy of the same name, which was part of the Holy Roman Empire and was predominantly populated by Swabian people. While living in Germany, Gaukel worked as a distiller. According to Gaukel's grandson, the historian Jacob Gaukel Stroh, he travelled to Amsterdam set to join an Arctic whaling expedition around 1800, but arrived after the fleet had already departed; one source lists 1800 as the date he left Europe. Subsequently, his name appears on a passenger manifest for a ship named the Rebecca which transported German immigrants from Holland to the Americas, which arrived at Philadelphia on 27 August 1804. The Dictionary of Canadian Biography suggests that he may have been attracted to Pennsylvania by the relocation to there of the charismatic preacher from Württemberg, John George Rapp, who sought to start a religious commune. Gaukel had indentured himself and, upon arriving in Pennsylvania, was bonded to a Pennsylvania Dutch farmer for a period of three years. After his term of indenture ended, he continued farming.

In 1812 or 1813, he married a woman named Polly Kaufman. Her parents had also been bonded servants, and when they died, she was adopted by a family and given the Kaufman surname. Oral family history holds that one of her grandparents was of Irish origin. Their oldest child, Nancy, was born in the early 1810s; Stroh puts her birth year as 1814. Heinrich (or Henry) was born in 1813, according to his gravestone, which would make him their second child, though Stroh implies that he was born later. In 1815, Gaukel was living near Johnstown, Pennsylvania, where another child, Emanuel, was born on 15 February. Two other children, Elizabeth and George, were also born in Pennsylvania.

=== Arrival in Canada ===
Around 1820, Gaukel heard of the Mennonite migration from Pennsylvania to Upper Canada and decided to follow the migration. After a four-week trip, he and his family arrived at Preston in Waterloo Township (the predecessor to Waterloo County). He began working at a distillery, then bought a small farm near Bridgeport where he opened a distillery of his own. Family members later recalled the farmstead consisting of a log cabin and a barn built from boards, which was a later construction that replaced (or was in addition to) an earlier log barn. There was also an orchard, and the family kept cattle. Gaukel had two more children, Levi and Susannah (born in 1823 and 1824 respectively), but tragedy struck when his wife Polly died in August 1827. In 1831, Gaukel held 50 acres (20 hectares) of land, with 31 acres (13 hectares) under cultivation.

Economic conditions in the area began to change rapidly around this time. Benjamin Eby, who had encouraged early migration to the area, began to sell land along King Street to prospective commercial businessmen in the hopes of building up a more concentrated settlement. These early businessmen included David and William Millar, who opened a dry goods and grocery store, and Jacob Hailer, another German immigrant, who opened a store selling chairs and spinning wheels on an acre of land at the southeast corner of King and Scott Streets that he had purchased from Eby in 1832. One of the earliest of these was an American, Phineas Varnum, who bought land along King Street West from Joseph Schneider to open a blacksmith shop and roadhouse or tavern. – Varnum built these businesses between 1820 and 1824 and operated them until the mid-1830s.

Gaukel bought the Varnum tavern site shortly after Hailer's arrival, but his land purchases would not end there. On 2 November 1833, he bought another set of lots from Joseph Schneider that extended along King up to the modern Ontario Street, as well as land on the other side of King Street from Benjamin Eby. At some point between the Hailer and Gaukel purchases, the Dorf had been named by Benjamin Eby as Berlin, and the deeds for land sold to Gaukel are the first recorded use of the name Berlin to refer to the community.

In July 1834, a travelling menagerie (referred to as a circus in some sources) visited nearby Galt (then a part of the neighbouring Dumfries Township). There were few opportunities for large entertainment events at this time in such remote pioneer communities, so the event drew in many people from the surrounding townships. Even before the arrival of the menagerie, rumours sprung up that members of the troupe were suffering from cholera, and some local residents petitioned the local magistrate, Absalom Shade, to order the event to be cancelled, which he declined. Following the event, dozens of people in different communities began exhibiting cholera symptoms, leading to a regional epidemic in an area with no hospitals and only a single doctor. Of the people who were infected, nearly two hundred died over a ten-day-long outbreak. This included both Gaukel's son Heinrich and his second wife, Maria Roschang (who had borne him his final child, Jacob).

=== Gaukel's Inn ===
Gaukel began operating his newly acquired tavern, but he had more ambitious plans. He invested in the property by building a large frame hotel which opened in 1835, which was named Gaukel's Inn or Gaukel's Tavern. It included stables and a driving-shed at the street corner. Meals were sold for fifteen cents and a glass of beer was sold for three cents. Gaukel was interested in civic affairs, and in the same year his hotel opened, he helped to fund the launch of Heinrich Wilhelm Peterson's Canada Museum, und Allgemeine Zeitung, which was published out of Berlin and was the first German-language weekly newspaper in Upper Canada. He was soon married to his third and final wife, Dorothea Weismiller, whom Stroh describes as Swabian and whom the Dictionary of Canadian Biography states was also from Württemberg.

With his new wife at his side, Gaukel and his inn became a part of the town's political infrastructure. They were the hosts to numerous political meetings, events held by social clubs, and other public gatherings in the village. In particular, the inn's wide veranda was a favoured spot for public speakers addressing crowds in the street. The inn was also the location where householders in Berlin and the surrounding area paid their taxes and nominated their representatives to the Wellington District Council.

During the early 1840s, Gaukel continued to expand his landholdings around Berlin, including a strip along King Street West up to the point of what later became Gaukel Street, a strip along Schneider's Road (later Queen Street), and lands along Weber Street East, including the lands that would later be used for the county courthouse.

== Legacy ==
Frederick Street and Gaukel Street in downtown Kitchener are both named after him.

== See also ==
- Jacob Gaukel Stroh, his grandson, who produced writings on the history of Waterloo County
- History of Kitchener, Ontario
- List of German Canadians
