= Canoeing at the 1972 Summer Olympics – Men's slalom K-1 =

These are the results of the men's K-1 slalom competition in canoeing at the 1972 Summer Olympics. The K-1 (kayak single) event is raced by one-man kayaks through a whitewater course. The venue for the 1972 Olympic competition was in Augsburg.

== Medalists ==
Gold	Silver	Bronze
Siegbert Horn (GDR)	Norbert Sattler (AUT)	Harald Gimpel (GDR)

== Results ==
The 37 competitors each took two runs through the whitewater slalom course on August 28. The best time of the two runs counted for the event.

Rank	Name	Run 1			Run 2			Result
Rank	Name	Time	Points	Total	Time	Points	Total	Total
Gold	Siegbert Horn (GDR)	263.20	100	363.20	258.56	10	268.56	268.56
Silver	Norbert Sattler (AUT)	260.76	10	270.76	261.31	40	301.31	270.76
Bronze	Harald Gimpel (GDR)	268.11	30	298.11	257.95	20	277.95	277.95
4	Ulrich Peters (FRG)	252.82	30	282.82	263.10	30	293.10	282.82
5	Alfred Baum (FRG)	258.01	30	288.01	270.72	120	390.72	288.01
6	Marián Havlíček (TCH)	261.69	140	401.69	249.56	40	289.56	289.56
7	Eric Evans (USA)	266.34	30	296.34	259.15	40	299.15	299.15
8	Jürgen Bremer (GDR)	268.50	140	408.50	263.15	40	303.15	303.15
9	Milan Spasovski (YUG)	286.71	20	306.71	274.15	80	354.15	306.71
10	Kurt Presslmayr (AUT)	272.10	50	322.10	291.36	20	311.36	311.36
11	Patrick Maccari (FRA)	261.40	50	311.40	249.10	120	369.10	311.40
12	Roberto D'Angelo (ITA)	270.44	110	380.44	284.21	30	314.21	314.21
13	Edi Heiz (SUI)	260.67	70	330.67	256.74	60	316.74	316.74
14	Jerzy Stanuch (POL)	277.09	40	317.09	270.52	210	480.52	317.09
15	Hans Schlecht (AUT)	269.19	110	379.19	279.60	40	319.60	319.60
16	Éric Koechlin (FRA)	279.17	90	369.17	280.87	50	330.87	330.87
17	Mario Di Stazio (ITA)	286.04	50	336.04	302.13	80	382.13	336.04
18	Giuseppe D'Angelo (ITA)	295.03	120	415.03	307.49	30	337.49	337.49
19	John Holland (USA)	265.19	80	345.19	277.82	60	337.82	337.82
20	Vlastimil Ouředník (TCH)	268.10	70	338.10	285.92	160	445.92	338.10
21	Alain Colombe (FRA)	319.52	120	439.52	289.54	50	339.54	339.54
22	David Mitchell (GBR)	283.02	60	343.02	300.52	60	360.52	343.02
23	Wojciech Gawroński (POL)	293.10	50	343.10	295.11	60	355.11	343.10
24	Gerard Collins (IRL)	322.13	200	522.13	297.95	50	347.95	347.95
25	Dubravko Mataković (YUG)	283.26	100	383.26	311.06	40	351.06	351.06
26	Jürgen Gerlach (FRG)	251.10	110	361.10	282.41	80	362.41	361.10
27	Peter Bäni (SUI)	277.41	100	377.41	277.41	150	427.41	377.41
28	Sandy Campbell (USA)	280.62	220	500.62	311.99	70	381.99	381.99
29	Zlatan Ibrahimbegović (YUG)	277.81	150	427.81	250.07	140	390.07	390.07
30	John MacLeod (GBR)	287.85	160	443.85	278.99	120	398.99	398.99
31	Gogi Naskidashvili (URS)	369.60	110	479.60	314.36	90	404.36	404.36
32	Raymond Calverley (GBR)	280.85	180	460.85	280.80	130	410.80	410.80
33	Hanspeter Hasler (SUI)	323.95	100	423.95	304.68	140	444.68	423.95
34	Eric Munshaw (CAN)	304.08	130	434.08	396.60	140	536.60	434.08
35	Heinz Poenn (CAN)	309.91	160	469.91	319.28	140	459.28	459.28
36	Shoken Okada (JPN)	366.78	130	496.78	–	–	–	496.78
37	Hermann Kerckhoff (CAN)	290.54	350	640.54	305.46	290	595.46	595.46
