= Milan Spasovski =

Yugoslav slalom canoeist (born 1951)

Milan "Mile" Spasovski (born 24 March 1951 in Skopje) is a Macedonian retired slalom canoeist who competed for Yugoslavia from the late 1960s to the mid-1970s. He finished ninth in the K-1 event at the 1972 Summer Olympics in Munich. For his performance, he was honored as the 1972 Macedonian Athlete of the Year.
