= Charles D'Angelo =

American weight loss coach

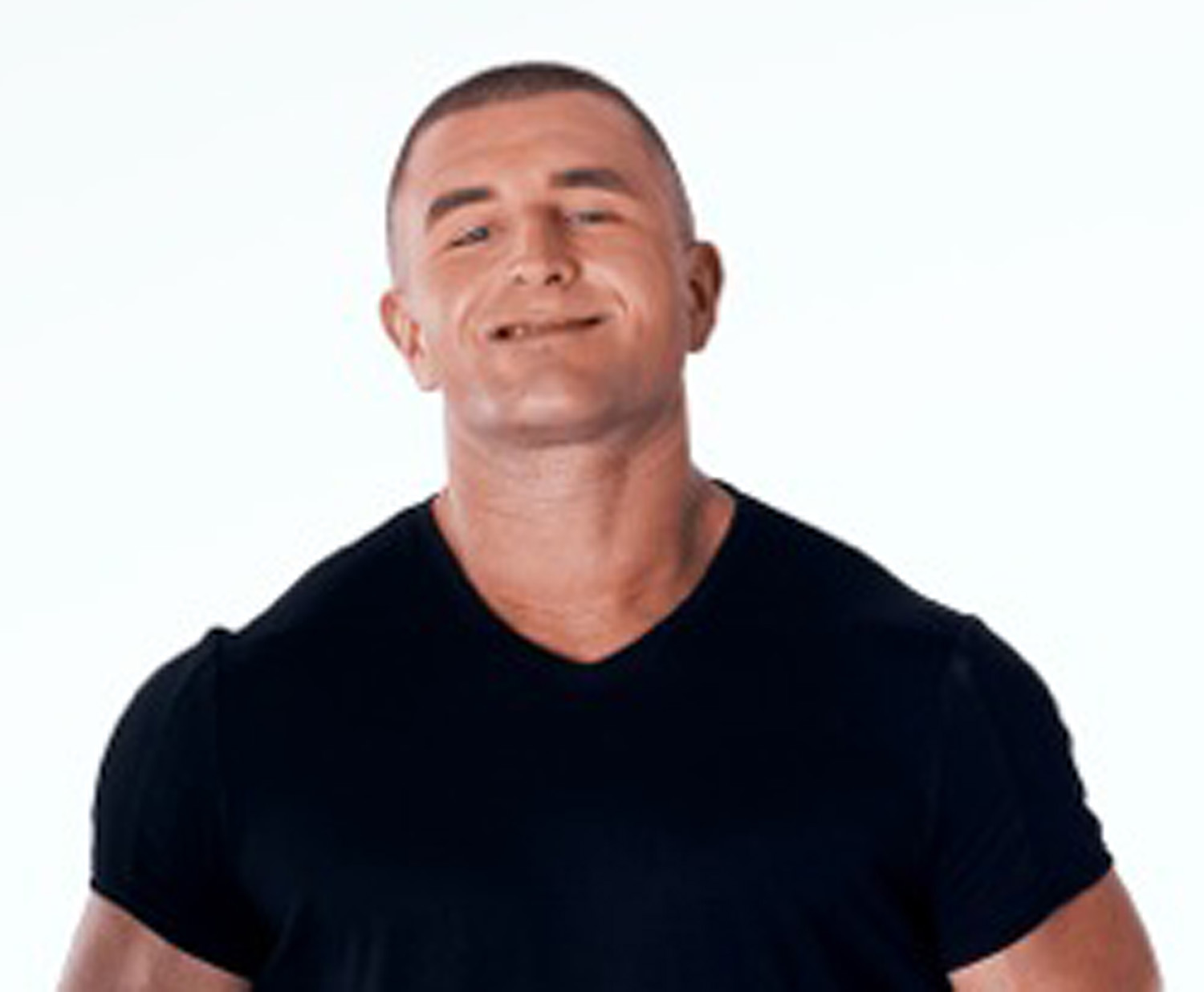
- D'Angelo in 2013
- Born: October 24, 1985 (age 40); St. Louis, Missouri
- Education: St. Louis University
- Occupation: Weight loss coach
- Years active: 2003-current
- Website: charlesdangelo.com

Charles D'Angelo (born October 24, 1985) is an American weight loss and personal development coach. He is the author of the self-help books Think and Grow Thin and Inner Guru.

== Early life and education ==
D'Angelo grew up in St. Louis, Missouri. At one point as a teenager, he was 6'4" inches (1.93 m) tall and weighed 360 pounds (163 kg). He was frightened that he might be going blind from type-2 diabetes and was regularly bullied about his weight. In 2003, at the age of 17, he saved up to join a gym, but was denied membership because his family didn't have a credit card. Instead, by putting himself on a regular exercise schedule and consistent diet plan, and studying psychology and self-help books, he was able to lose 160 pounds over the following 2 years. He then began lifting weights to develop muscle. While attending St. Louis University, he was invited to speak about his weight loss to groups in St. Louis.

== Career ==
=== Weight loss program ===
As he entered college, D'Angelo founded a weight-loss and life coaching program in St. Louis. D'Angelo's weight loss program revolves around what he calls the "three-legged stool": healthy eating, regular exercise and developing a strategic mindset, with a goal-oriented focus. D'Angelo recommends that clients prioritize healthy eating and exercise and that they work out at least five times a week, create a sustainable plan, and keep exercise fun. In order to separate food from emotion, clients eat the same healthy meals every day for two weeks at a time, consisting of breakfast followed by small meals every two-to-three hours. D'Angelo also works with his clients to help them develop and achieve life goals.

In addition to clients in North America, Europe and Australia, D'Angelo has a number of famous clients, include actress Angela Bassett, Missouri Senator Claire McCaskill, former Missouri Secretary of State Robin Carnahan and former Speaker of the Missouri House Catherine Hanaway.

=== Books and media ===
D'Angelo's weight loss guide, Think and Grow Thin, was published on January 16, 2012. The book presents an 88-day weight loss plan. He worked on it for five years, starting when he was a student at St. Louis University. It was endorsed by Bill Clinton as one of Clinton's three favorite diet books of 2012; he wrote a blurb for the book after D'Angelo successfully coached several of Clinton's friends. It has also been endorsed by Tony Robbins and Richard Simmons.

D'Angelo's second book, Inner Guru, was published in 2017, with a foreword by Larry King, and endorsement from Mark Hyman. The self-improvement book encourages readers to improve their lives by changing the way they think, with a focus on identifying and breaking negative patterns in their lives. It also tells stories of D'Angelo's clients who have had success losing and keeping off large amounts of weight.

D'Angelo has appeared on Larry King Live and The Doctors with stories of past clients who have lost a lot of weight. In 2020 he was interviewed on Access Hollywood to discuss sharing his story of weight loss and physical fitness with Oprah Winfrey on her wellness tour.

== Personal life ==
D'Angelo lives in St. Louis, Missouri, with his wife Crystal.

== Bibliography ==
- Think and Grow Thin: The Revolutionary Diet & Weight-Loss System That Will Change Your Life (Robert Kennedy Publishing, 2012)
- Inner Guru: The Guide to Mastering Your Health, Wealth and Relationships From the Inside Out (CDA Publishing, 2017) – foreword by Larry King
