= Fat Friends =

British television drama

- Genre: Comedy drama
- Created by: Kay Mellor
- Written by: Kay Mellor; Gaynor Mellor; Debbie Oats; Jayne Daniels
- Starring: Alison Steadman; Gaynor Faye; Ruth Jones; James Corden; Janet Dibley; Lynda Baron
- Opening theme: "Perfect 10", performed by The Beautiful South
- Composer: Mark Russell
- Country of origin: United Kingdom
- Original language: English
- No. of series: 4
- No. of episodes: 25

Production
- Running time: 45 minutes (per episode)
- Production companies: Rollem Productions; Tiger Aspect Productions; Yorkshire Television

Original release
- Network: ITV
- Release: 12 October 2000 – 24 March 2005

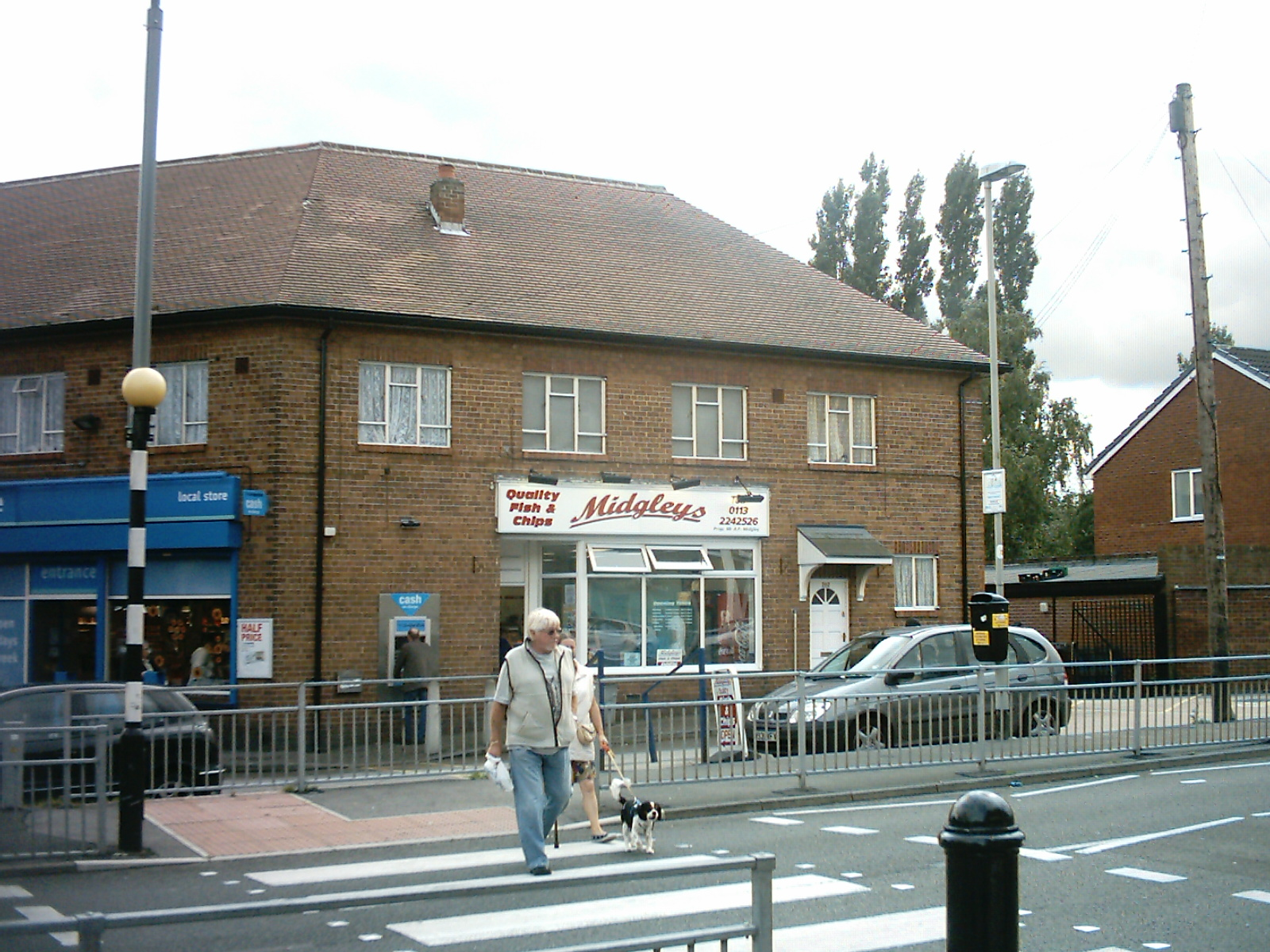
Midgley's fish and chip shop in Moor Grange, Leeds, featured as "Big and Battered".

Fat Friends is a British comedy drama that aired on ITV from 12 October 2000 to 24 March 2005, consisting of 25 episodes over four series. Set in Leeds, the series explores the lives of several slimming club members, with a focus on the various ways their weight has impacted upon them.

The series was created by Kay Mellor and made by Rollem Productions in association with Tiger Aspect Productions and Yorkshire Television.

== Premise ==
Fat Friends is set around a slimming club in the Headingley district of Leeds. The club is run by the formidable Carol (Janet Dibley), who fruitlessly tries to persuade the members of the group to follow the "Super Slimmers" diet. The characters who attend the club are from various backgrounds and of various weights. While some plots continue throughout all four series, each episode focuses on one particular character.

== Cast and characters ==
- Alison Steadman as Betty Simpson
- Gaynor Faye as Lauren Harris
- Ruth Jones as Kelly Chadwick (née Simpson)
- Jonathan Ryland as Kevin Chadwick
- James Corden as Jamie Rymer
- Janet Dibley as Carol McGary
- Barrie Rutter as Douglas Simpson
- Richard Ridings as Alan Ashburn (series 1–3)
- Kathryn Hunt as Val Lorrimer (series 1–2)
- Josie Lawrence as Julia Fleshman (series 1–2)
- Jason Merrells as Carl Whittaker/Carl Watkinson (series 1–2)
- Rita May as Joan Kirk (series 1)
- Meera Syal as Aysha Kapoor (series 1)
- Eleanor Bron as Marilyn Harris
- Allan Corduner as Leonard Harris
- Lisa Riley as Rebecca Patterson (series 2–4)
- Lynda Baron as Norma Patterson (series 2–4)
- Paul Warriner as Paul Thompson (series 2–4)
- Julian Kerridge as Sean Hurst (series 2–4)
- David Harewood as Max Robertson (series 3–4)
- Janine Mellor as Mercedes (series 4)

== Episodes ==
=== Series overview ===
Series	Episodes	Originally released	
Series	Episodes	First released	Last released
1	6	12 October 2000	16 November 2000
2	7	5 September 2002	17 October 2002
3	6	1 January 2004	4 February 2004
4	6	17 February 2005	24 March 2005

=== Series 1 (2000) ===
No. overall	No. in series	Title	Directed by	Written by	Original release date
1	1	"Love Me Slender"	David Wheatley	Kay Mellor	12 October 2000
Kelly Simpson is determined to get in her two-sizes-too-small wedding dress in time for her big day. Meanwhile, at the slimming club, her mum, Betty, has won through to the regional finals of Superslimmers 2000, even though her husband isn't that happy about her losing weight.
2	2	"Fat Chance"	David Wheatley	Kay Mellor	19 October 2000
Alan Ashburn is losing weight for his 20th wedding anniversary celebrations, but a romantic meal out with his wife ends in their relationship falling apart.
3	3	"Fat Free"	David Wheatley	Kay Mellor	26 October 2000
Actress Lauren Harris has won herself a part in a soap. She is convinced that losing five pounds would make her a better actress. She is also having problems with her mum, who is convinced that she is anorexic, and her boyfriend, Gareth, whose nickname for her is "pudding".
4	4	"Growing Pains"	Audrey Cooke	Kay Mellor	2 November 2000
15-year-old member of Superslimmers Jamie reveals the reasons for his depressed state – his mother is battling depression and he is being teased at school. He eventually decides that he can't cope with the pressure of it all and contemplates suicide.
5	5	"Face the Fat"	Audrey Cooke	Kay Mellor	9 November 2000
Val prepares to launch her new magazine, but the quest for something trendy to wear and a call to an escort agency for a partner to attend the bash produce further revelations about the slimming world – and herself.
6	6	"When the Fat Lady Sings"	Audrey Cooke	Kay Mellor	16 November 2000
Kelly spends the night at a club, but the slimming pills and alcohol make her lose all inhibitions. Kevin tries to find out why he was kept in the dark about the photo session. There's shocking news for Betty when she tries to collect a prescription.

=== Series 2 (2002) ===
No. overall	No. in series	Title	Directed by	Written by	Original release date
7	1	"Full Belly"	Audrey Cooke	Kay Mellor	5 September 2002
Carol faces her own problems when her husband leaves her, leaving her alone with her son. Things then take a horrible turn when Carol decides to go on a diet.
8	2	"Peaches and Dreams"	Audrey Cooke	Kay Mellor	12 September 2002
Lauren's lingerie party turns awkward when her father shows up.
9	3	"Forty and In-fat-urated"	Tania Díez	Jayne Daniel & Kay Mellor	19 September 2002
Birthday blues are the least of Val's problems. Mistrust, jealousy and insecurity turn her world upside down after she confronts her male escort lover about what he gets up to with his clients.
10	4	"Sweet and Sour"	Dan Zeff	Kay Mellor	26 September 2002
The arrival of divorce papers sends bus driver Alan's blood pressure rocketing, with the result that he fails a medical and loses his job.
11	5	"Sticky Fingers"	Dan Zeff	Gaynor Faye & Kay Mellor	3 October 2002
Lonely teenager Jamie thinks that his fortunes have changed when he makes the acquaintance of second-hand car dealer Craig. He spends his 17th-birthday money on flash clothes and a mobile phone in a desperate bid to fit in with Craig's crowd, but soon realises his new friend is a shady operator with a criminal past. Can his policeman father help him cut his ties with the villain?
12	6	"In Full Bloom"	Tania Díez	Lisa Holdsworth & Kay Mellor	10 October 2002
Despite being overweight, Rebecca Patterson is generally content with life – particularly as her job as the assistant manager at a garden centre allows her to work alongside the man she secretly adores. However, the shy and retiring twenty-something's cosy world is shattered by the return of a figure from her past, who proceeds to subject her to cruel psychological tortures.
13	7	"Hunger Pangs"	Audrey Cooke	Kay Mellor	17 October 2002
Betty Simpson's already stressful life takes another twist when her childhood sweetheart joins the slimming club, prompting the return of long-suppressed feelings and revelations about a dark secret from her past.

=== Series 3 (2004) ===
No. overall	No. in series	Title	Directed by	Written by	Original release date
14	1	"Eat Your Heart Out"	John Deery	Kay Mellor	1 January 2004
It's Christmas Eve, and the Count with Carol gang are appearing live on Trisha to debate the pros and cons of dieting, but the talk turns to something altogether more interesting when Betty inadvertently blurts out to the entire viewing nation that she has a secret son. To add to her problems, she also discovers that husband Douglas hasn't been entirely honest about the family's income. Little does she know, however, that her TV appearance will bring her an unexpected gift – one that she's been waiting for most of her life.
15	2	"Leggs Over Easy"	John Anderson	Gaynor Faye & Kay Mellor	7 January 2004
Things go from bad to worse for Kelly. Still trying to deal with the news of her mum's past, problems start to occur in her marriage, resulting in her sleeping with her husband Kevin's gay brother. When all is revealed, things get even worse for Kelly, especially when she finds out that she's pregnant, but who is the father?
16	3	"Food for Thought"	John Anderson	Gaynor Faye & Kay Mellor	14 January 2004
Carol faces problems this week when she realises she has fallen for fitness instructor Max, which ends up causing problems with her teenage son.
17	4	"Bacon, Bagels and the Bishop"	Lance Kneeshaw	Katie Baxendale & Kay Mellor	21 January 2004
Lauren has the chance to make all her acting dreams come true, but at the price of losing everything and everybody that matters. Can she get back her friends when she needs them most?
18	5	"Afters"	Lance Kneeshaw	Kay Mellor & Debbie Oates	28 January 2004
Rebecca decides it's time to leave home. Her boyfriend, Sean, is keen to help with the move, but her break for independence is short-lived when tragedy strikes and Norma needs support.
19	6	"Food of Love"	Lance Kneeshaw	Katie Baxendale & Kay Mellor	4 February 2004
Jamie's love life picks up when he falls for a beautiful woman who falls for him, too, but when things get in the way, such as her having a daughter and an ex-prisoner ex-boyfriend, will things turn out for the best for Jamie? The gang also head back to Trisha for their final weigh-in. While Jamie provides the food, Kelly gives birth to a baby boy. Note: this episode sees the guest appearance of Trisha Goddard.

=== Series 4 (2005) ===
No. overall	No. in series	Title	Directed by	Written by	Original release date
20	1	"Enough to Go Around"	John Deery	Kay Mellor	17 February 2005
The group struggles back from a Spanish hotel stay that they won from their appearance on Trisha. Betty can't wait to get home, so intent is she on seeing her son Simon.
21	2	"Second Helpings"	Lance Kneeshaw	Gaynor Faye & Kay Mellor	24 February 2005
Kelly starts to moan about Betty's friendship with her long-lost son, and she starts to mistreat Kev. She is then tempted by Max as Kev gets a new assistant in the chip shop. Will Kelly be able to hold it together with her new fitness coach?
22	3	"Angel's Delight"	Lance Kneeshaw	Ruth Jones & Kay Mellor	3 March 2005
Norma throws herself into pensioner speed-dating and, after two glasses of wine, decides to advertise herself on the local radio lonely hearts phone-in. It's not long before a queue of eligible men has formed around the block, but it's the dashing Eddie who captures her heart. Bowling, dancing and romancing ensue, and soon a weekend in Filey is on the cards. Is Eddie all he seems, though?
23	4	"Get Out of the Kitchen"	Lance Kneeshaw	Gaynor Faye & Kay Mellor	10 March 2005
Claire and her little girl have moved in with Jamie, but are her feelings of sickness more than just a dodgy curry? The barmaid at Woody's seems to know the answer and so much more, as she doesn't even know Claire by that name. Rebecca suspects the truth, but keeps her mouth shut until it's too late. Claire is then hit by a car resulting in her death, and Jamie decides to fight for custody of Claire's daughter.
24	5	"Healthy Options"	John Anderson	Kay Mellor & Debbie Oates	17 March 2005
The friends head off for a free weekend at a health spa. Carol has done a dodgy deal, as, all of a sudden, the friends are booked for a photo-shoot. Some parts are OK, yet others are a little bit revealing. Max and Carol flirt with each other, which ends up a little bit more than they both suspected. Carol then finds out about Max's past and decides not to go with him. They end up together at the end of the episode, while Lauren has decided that this is her perfect chance to get beautified before the wedding, and Norma seems more intent on eating the fruit than wearing it.
25	6	"Icing on the Cake"	John Anderson	Kay Mellor & Debbie Oates	24 March 2005
Lauren's wedding day approaches. She's always been the skinniest of the bunch, but not without problems. Having found her dream man in vicar Paul, she also gets a shot at fame as a weathergirl. Only Paul seems jealous of her success, while her parents refuse to come to the wedding. She's got a fabulous frock and a man willing to make a sacrifice for her, but will there be a happy ending?

== Ratings ==
Series 1
Episode No.	Airdate	Total Viewers	ITV Weekly Rank
1.1	12 October 2000	10,370,000	13
1.2	19 October 2000	8,660,000	16
1.3	26 October 2000	9,190,000	16
1.4	2 November 2000	9,140,000	15
1.5	9 November 2000	8,790,000	16
1.6	16 November 2000	9,610,000	16

Series 2
Episode No.	Airdate	Total Viewers	ITV Weekly Rank
2.1	5 September 2002	7,810,000	16
2.2	12 September 2002	7,260,000	14
2.3	19 September 2002	7,280,000	12
2.4	26 September 2002	6,610,000	16
2.5	3 October 2002	6,450,000	18
2.6	10 October 2002	6,990,000	15
2.7	17 October 2002	7,020,000	16

Series 3
Episode No.	Airdate	Total Viewers	ITV Weekly Rank
3.1	1 January 2004	6,470,000	23
3.2	7 January 2004	7,360,000	19
3.3	14 January 2004	7,470,000	18
3.4	21 January 2004	7,540,000	17
3.5	28 January 2004	8,690,000	22
3.6	4 February 2004	7,240,000	22

Series 4
Episode No.	Airdate	Total Viewers	ITV Weekly Rank
4.1	17 February 2005	6,560,000	18
4.2	24 February 2005	7,510,000	15
4.3	3 March 2005	7,030,000	19
4.4	10 March 2005	5,600,000	20
4.5	17 March 2005	6,050,000	20
4.6	24 March 2005	5,790,000	19

== Awards and nominations ==
- British Academy Television Award
  - Best Actress for Alison Steadman – Nominated
  - Best Drama Series for Kay Mellor & Greg Brenman & David Reynolds – Nominated
- Royal Television Society Programme Awards
  - On-Screen Network Newcomer for James Corden – Nominated
- TV Quick Awards
  - Best New Drama – Won
- Television and Radio Industries Club Awards
  - TV Drama Programme – Won

== Home media ==
Fat Friends was originally released on VHS for its first series, and was the only series to be released in the format. This was followed by a DVD release of the first series, as well as box set comprising the first three series, in March 2005, while the second and third series were made available individually in April 2005. Distribution rights were held by Sony Pictures Home Entertainment in the UK, however all DVD releases are now out-of-print. The fourth series has never been released on DVD.

The first series was also released in Australia in 2005, via Shock Records, and in the United States, from Alchemy / Millennium in 2007.

Series	Release date				No. of discs	Rating	
Series	VHS (UK)	Region 1 DVD	Region 2 DVD	Region 4 DVD	No. of discs	BBFC	ACB
Series 1	24 June 2002	13 February 2007	21 March 2005	19 September 2005	2	15	MA15+
Series 2	—N/a	—N/a	18 April 2005	—N/a	2	15	—N/a
Series 3	—N/a	—N/a	18 April 2005	—N/a	2	15	—N/a
Series 1, 2 & 3	—N/a	—N/a	21 March 2005	—N/a	6	15	—N/a

== Stage musical adaptation ==
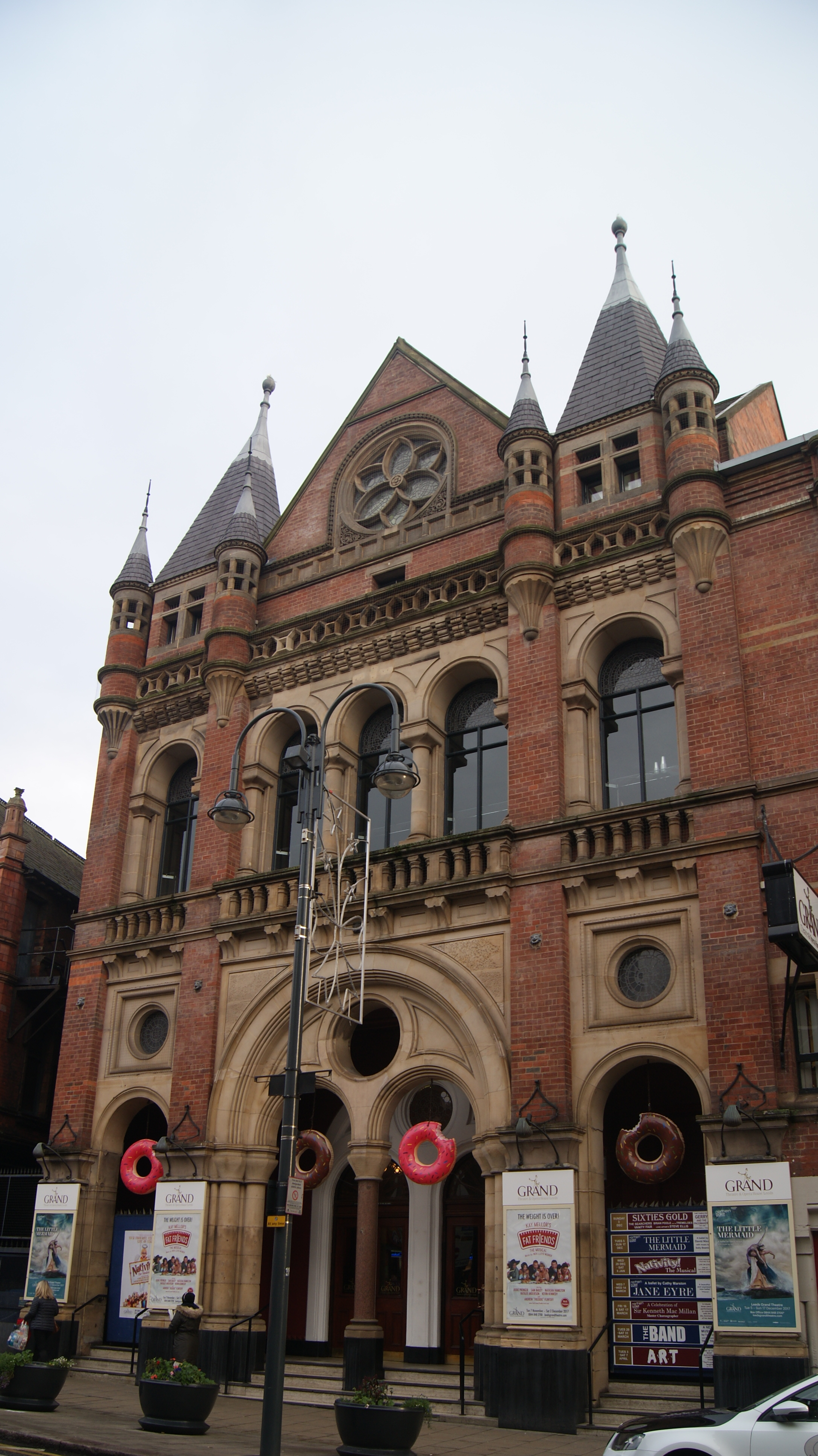
Grand Theatre, Leeds, decorated for Fat Friends the Musical

A stage musical adaptation of the series directed and written by original creator, Kay Mellor, with music by Nicholas Lloyd Webber made its world premiere at the Grand Theatre in Leeds on 7 November 2017 before embarking on a UK tour, starring Jodie Prenger as Kelly Stevenson.
