= Vlastimil Ouředník =

Czechoslovak slalom canoeist (born 1951)

Vlastimil Ouředník (born February 10, 1951, in České Budějovice) is a Czechoslovak retired slalom canoeist who competed in the early-to-mid 1970s. He finished 20th in the K-1 event at the 1972 Summer Olympics in Munich.
