= Heinz Poenn =

Canadian canoeist (1934–2016)

Heinz Poenn (September 11, 1934 – October 23, 2016) was a Canadian slalom canoeist who competed in the early 1970s. He finished 35th in the K-1 event at the 1972 Summer Olympics in Munich.

Poenn was born in Fürth, Germany and emigrated to Canada in 1957. He was a long-time resident of Holland Landing, Ontario and owned a stainless steel manufacturing company in nearby Vaughan.

Poenn was a true pioneer in the sport of canoe slalom in Canada. In 1965, he was a member of the first Canadian team at the World Championships in Spittal, Austria. He competed in the Men’s K-1 at the Munich 1972 Olympic Games, the first appearance of canoe slalom as an Olympic-level sport. He was later a Coach for the National Team and served on the International Canoe Federation Slalom Committee. He worked to bring the Slalom and Downriver World Championships to Jonquière, Quebec in 1979.

Poenn also worked to establish the Minden White Water Preserve in Ontario, which was used to host events at the 2015 Pan American Games.

Poenn died on October 23, 2016, in Little Current, Ontario.

== See also ==
- List of German Canadians
