= Sandy Campbell (canoeist) =

American canoeist (born 1946)

Dwight Alexander "Sandy" Campbell (born February 26, 1946) is an American retired slalom canoeist who competed from the late 1960s to the early 1970s. He finished 28th in the K-1 event at the 1972 Summer Olympics in Munich. Campbell was born in Buffalo, New York.

== Sources ==
- Sports-reference.com profile
