= John Holland (canoeist) =

American canoeist (born 1952)

John Holland (born August 18, 1952 in Sacramento, California) is an American retired slalom canoeist who competed from the late 1960s to the late 1970s. He finished 19th in the K-1 event at the 1972 Summer Olympics in Munich.
