= D'Angelo (given name) =

D'Angelo is a given name. Notable people with the name include:

- D'Angelo Brewer (born 1996), American football player
- D'Angelo Cherry (born 1990), American sprinter
- D'Angelo Dinero or Elijah Burke (born 1978), American professional wrestler
- D'Angelo Harrison (born 1993), American basketball player
- D'Angelo Jiménez (born 1977), Dominican-born baseball player
- D'Angelo Leuila (born 1997), New Zealand rugby union player
- D'Angelo Marshall (born 1990), Curaçaoan-Dutch kickboxer
- D'Angelo Ponds, American football player
- D'Angelo Ross (born 1996), American football player
- D'Angelo Russell (born 1996), American basketball player
- D'Angelo Wallace (born 1998), American YouTuber
- D'Angelo Lovell Williams (born 1992), American photographer

== Fictional characters ==
- D'Angelo Barksdale, criminal organization lieutenant on The Wire

== See also ==
- D'Angelo (surname)
