= Gogi Naskidashvili =

Soviet slalom canoeist

Gogi Mikheilovich Nask'idashvili (16 August 1947, Mtskheta – 18 April 1983) was a Soviet slalom canoeist who competed in the early 1970s. He finished 31st in the K-1 event at the 1972 Summer Olympics in Munich.

Died in traffic collision in Georgia.
