= Giuseppe D'Angelo =

Giuseppe D'Angelo may refer to:

- Giuseppe D'Angelo (slalom canoeist), Italian slalom canoer
- Giuseppe D'Angelo, a pensioner who was killed when he was mistaken for Mafia boss Bartolomeo Spatola
- Giuseppe D'Angelo, President of Sicily from 1961 to 1964
- Giuseppe D'Angelo (died 1566), a person executed for homosexuality
