= Eric Bergman =

Henry Eric Bergman
- Born: Heinrich Erich Bergmann; 1893; Dresden, Kingdom of Saxony, German Empire
- Died: 1958 (aged 64–65); Winnipeg, Manitoba, Canada
- Education: Art and Trade School of Dresden
- Known for: engraver

Henry Eric Bergman (1893–1958), born Heinrich Erich Bergmann, was a Canadian artist born in Dresden, Germany. Bergman’s training was as a commercial wood engraver illustrating catalogs and business prospectuses. He later took up fine art working in pencil, watercolour, oil paint, colour wood block printing but he is best known for his fine black and white wood engravings. Bergman was close friends with Harold R. Foster who created the comic strip Prince Valiant, and appeared on the Hal Foster episode of This Is Your Life in 1954.

== Chronology ==
- November 10, 1893 born in Dresden, Germany
- 1911 obtained a Diploma of Merit from the Art and Trade School of Dresden, after three years of study.
- 1913 he came to Canada
- 1914 joined Brigdens Limited in Winnipeg, Manitoba where he spent many years as a commercial wood engraver for the Eaton's catalogue.
- 1922 – he was inspired by Frederick Henry (Fred) Brigden and Walter J. Phillips to take up fine arts
- 1926 - first wood engraving
- 1927 and 1930 His work was reproduced in special editions of The Studio
- 1933 + 1936 exhibited in the Warsaw Exhibition
- February 9, 1958 died Winnipeg, Manitoba, Canada
- Also a charter member of the Winnipeg Art Gallery, charter member and past president of the Society of Canadian Painter-Etchers and Engravers (founded in 1916), and a member of the Canadian Handicrafts Guild.

== See also ==
- List of German Canadians
