= Eric Munshaw =

Canadian slalom canoer (1954–2018)

Eric Munshaw (February 10, 1954 – March 15, 2018) was a Canadian slalom canoer who competed in the early 1970s. He finished 34th in the K-1 event at the 1972 Summer Olympics in Munich.
