= Peter Bäni =

Swiss slalom canoeist (born 1954)

Peter Bäni (born 7 February 1945) is a Swiss retired slalom canoeist who competed from the late 1960s to the early 1970s. He finished 27th in the K-1 event at the 1972 Summer Olympics in Munich.
