= Eric Evans (canoeist) =

American slalom canoeist

Eric Mayfield Evans (born February 27, 1950, in Exeter, New Hampshire) is an American retired slalom canoeist who competed from the late 1960s to the late 1970s. He finished seventh in the K-1 event at the 1972 Summer Olympics in Munich. He graduated Dartmouth College in 1972, and was coached by his father, Jay Evans.
