= Hanspeter Hasler =

Swiss retired slalom canoeist (born 1953)

Hanspeter Hasler (born 26 June 1953) is a Swiss retired slalom canoeist who competed in the early 1970s. He finished 33rd in the K-1 event at the 1972 Summer Olympics in Munich.
