= List of German Canadians =

This is a list of notable German Canadians.

== Academics ==
- Heribert Adam – political sociologist with a focus on ethnonationalism, born in Germany
- Hans Heilbronn – mathematician born in Berlin
- Fritz Heichelheim – German Jewish historian of ancient economics, born in Giessen, Hesse

=== Scientists ===
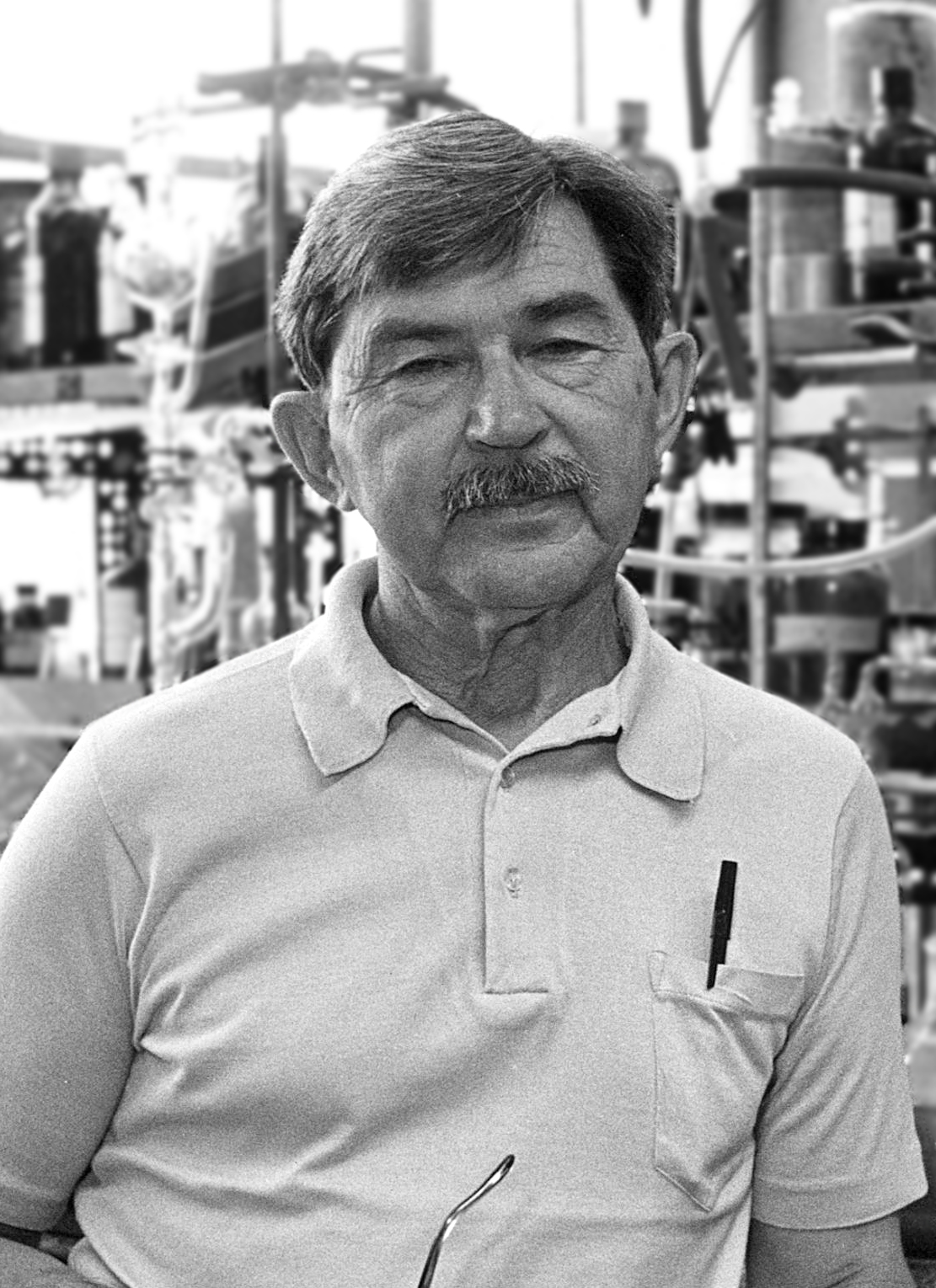
Henry Taube

- Abraham Pineo Gesner – physician and geologist, inventor of kerosene
- Gerhard Herzberg – physicist and physical chemist; Nobel Prize in Chemistry (1971)
- David H. Hubel – neurophysiologist; Nobel Prize in Physiology or Medicine (1981)
- Heinz Lehmann – psychiatrist, known for his use of chlorpromazine in treating schizophrenia
- Walter Mandler – lens designer for ELCAN, pioneer in computer-aided design
- Georg Naumann – trapper, explorer, and self-taught scientist who studied the Athabasca oil sands, born in Radeberg, Saxony
- Bernhard Schlegel – computational and theoretical chemist born in Frankfurt am Main
- Henry Taube – chemist; Nobel Prize in Chemistry (1983)

== Artists ==
- Eric Bergman – artist primarily known for his engraving work, born in Dresden
- Emanuel Hahn – sculptor and coin designer, co-founder and first president of the Sculptors' Society of Canada, brother of Gustav Hahn, born in Reutlingen, Baden-Württemberg
- Ulrich "Fred" Herzog – photographer notable for capturing Vancouver street scenes, born in Stuttgart

=== Musicians ===
- Andrea Ludwig – mezzo-soprano
- Justin Bieber – musician, paternal great grandfather was of German ancestry.
- Matt Brouwer – gospel singer
- Deadmau5 (Joel Thomas Zimmerman) – electronic music producer and DJ
- Joe Hall (born Hans Joachim Boenke) – folk rock musician born in Wuppertal
- John Kay – rock star, singer and composer
- Tate McRae – singer born to a German mother
- Lights – singer and rock artist
- K.D. Lang – singer, composer

=== Painters ===
- Gustav Hahn – painter, muralist, and interior decorator associated with the Art Nouveau movement, brother of Emanuel Hahn, born in Reutlingen, Baden-Württemberg
- Otto Reinhold Jacobi – painter, president of the Royal Canadian Academy of Arts, born in Königsberg

== Businesspeople ==
- Philip Ludwig "Louis" Breithaupt – tanner and mayor of Berlin, Ontario, born in Allendorf, Hesse
- Friedrich Gaukel – innkeeper, distiller, hotelier born in Württemberg
- Thorsten Heins – businessman and former chief executive officer of BlackBerry, born in Gifhorn, Lower Saxony
- Jacob Hespeler – founder of Hespeler, Ontario, born in Ehningen, Württemberg
- William Hespeler – founder of Niverville, Manitoba
- Stephen A. Jarislowsky – business magnate and investor born in Berlin
- John Adam Rittinger – proprietor and editor of Berliner Journal (1904–1915), Pennsylvania German humorist
- Tobias Lütke – founder and CEO of Shopify, born in Koblenz, Rhineland-Palatinate

== Politicians ==
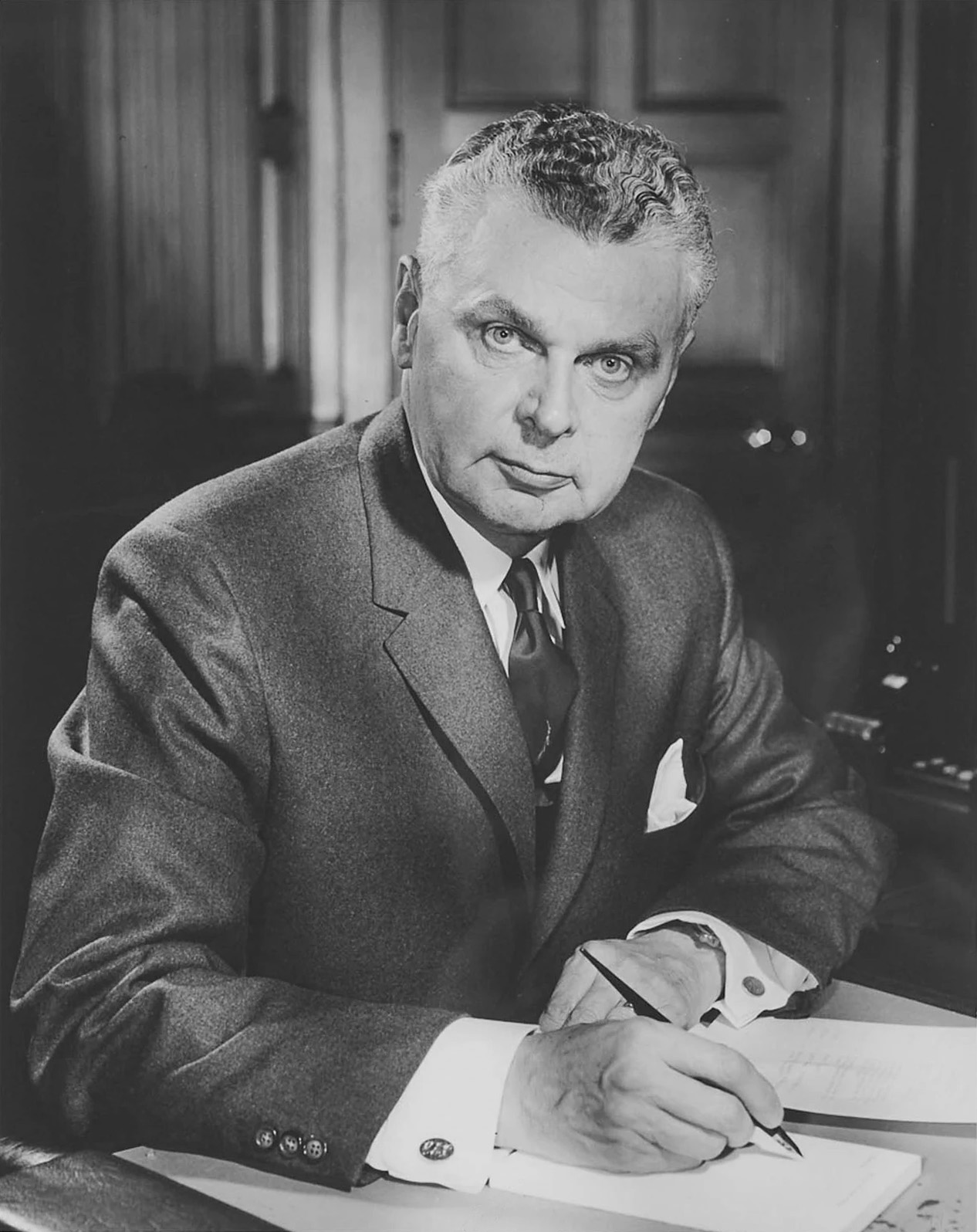
John Diefenbaker

- Adam Beck – politician and hydroelectricity advocate
- Henry Eilber – early Ontario businessman and political figure, born to a German father
- John Diefenbaker – 13th Prime Minister of Canada
- Ralph Klein – 12th premier of Alberta
- Hugo Kranz – member of parliament for Waterloo North, mayor of Berlin, Ontario, born at Lehrbach, Hesse
- John Motz – mayor of Berlin, Ontario, 1880–1881. Co-founder of Berliner Journal newspaper.
- William Steeves – merchant, lumberman, and politician; Father of Canadian Confederation

== Sportspeople ==
- Sven Butenschön – ice hockey player and coach born in Itzehoe
- Sven Habermann – soccer player, former member of the Canada men's national soccer team, born in West Berlin
- Hermann Kerckhoff – slalom canoeist born in Berlin
- Brock Lesnar – American born professional wrestler and former MMA fighter, obtained Canadian citizenship during the 2010s
- Jahkeele Marshall-Rutty – professional soccer player
- Heinz Poenn – slalom canoeist born in Fürth, Bavaria
- Alfred Wurr – wrestler who competed for Canada in the 1972 Summer Olympics, member of the Manitoba Sports Hall of Fame, born in Hamburg
