= Zlatan Ibrahimbegović =

Yugoslav canoeist (1948–2026)

Zlatan Ibrahimbegović

Zlatan Ibrahimbegović (18 March 1948 – 27 July 2026) was a Yugoslav slalom canoeist who competed from the late 1960s to the late 1970s. He finished 29th in the K-1 event at the 1972 Summer Olympics in Munich. He lived in Western Australia and taught canoe slalom classes at Swan Canoe Club and Ascot Kayak Club in Perth after his retirement until his death.

Ibrahimbegovic died in Perth on 27 July 2026, at the age of 78.

== Sources ==
- Sports-reference.com profile
