= Georg Naumann =

German scientist and trapper

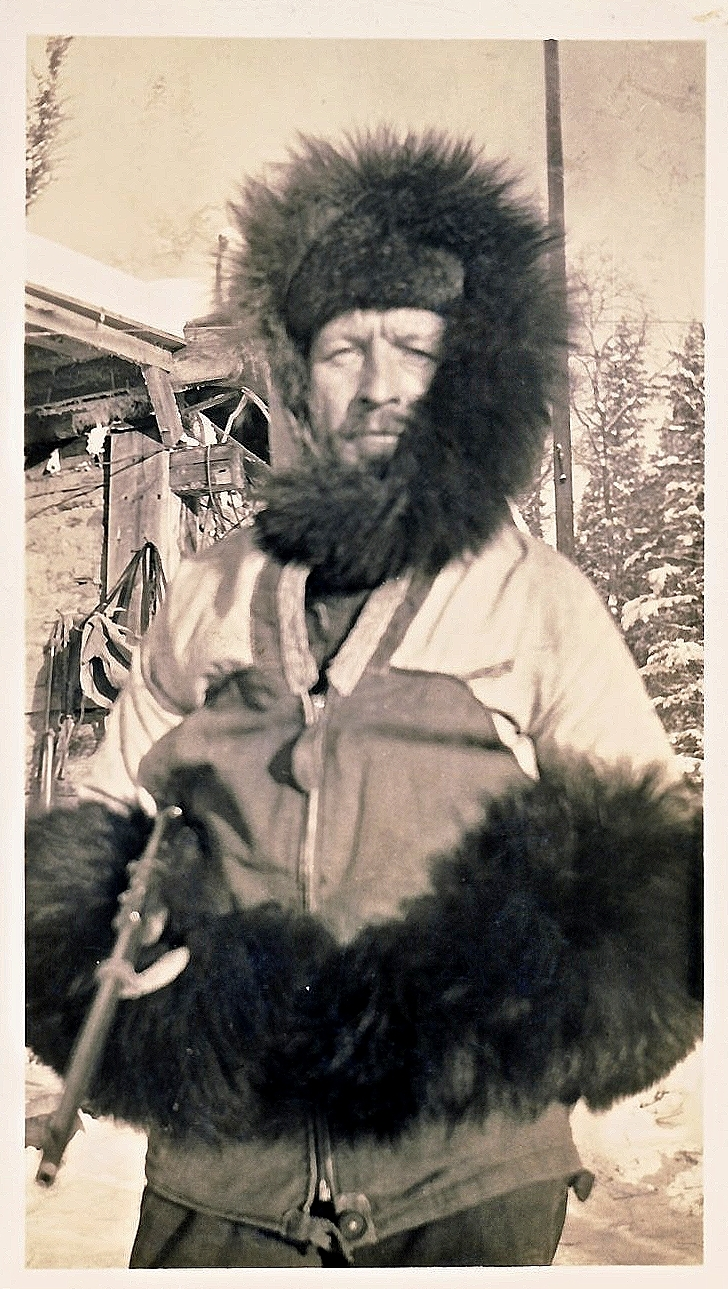
- Born: November 10, 1901; Radeberg, Germany
- Died: June 6, 1978 (aged 76); Athabasca, Alberta, Canada
- Resting place: Upper Wells / Athabasca, Alberta
- Citizenship: Canadian, documented in 1938
- Scientific career
- Fields: scientist, trapper and pioneer of the early local exploration and use of oil wells and natural gas deposits

Kurt Georg Naumann (1901–1978) was a German scientist, trapper and pioneer of the early local exploration and use of oil wells and natural gas deposits in the northern catchment area of Athabasca River in Canada.

== Biography ==
Georg Naumann was the eldest son of the Radeberg factory worker August Otto Naumann (1874–1922) and his wife Anna, née Berger (1876–1966), who had another five children (four sons and one daughter). After the early death of his father, the responsibility for the supporting of the family fell on Georg's – the eldest son's – shoulders. That was difficult, all the more so, as the family's basis means of subsistence were at risk after the Great War and the following years. After being a schoolboy in Lotzdorf, he trained to be a miller, a baker and a sawmiller at Liegauer Grundmühle. In his free time he worked in the field of science and self-studied, taking advantage of the offers of the German group Kosmos Gesellschaft der Naturfreunde. The family lived on the outskirts of the town of Radeberg near Dresdner Heide (a large forest area). In this way it was convenient for him to occupy himself with forestry and hunting from early childhood. At the beginning of the 1920s he became unemployed as a result of the recession and depression in the economy and he wanted to join the many emigrants to the United States, Canada, Brazil or Australia.

The taxidermist and naturalist Max Hinsche (1896–1939) from Radeberg was looking for a partner for his expedition to the northwest of Canada when he met Naumann. A research assignment for a several years' expedition to the northwest of Canada had been given to Max Hinsche by the Staatlichen Museen für Tierkunde und Völkerkunde Dresden. He chose Naumann as his companion. In Max Hinsche's book "Kanada wirklich erlebt", which was published in 1938, Naumann is documented as "Partner N". Almost without means they both started their expedition. On May 27, 1926, they embarked the steam turbine-powered ship Empress of France from Hamburg to Quebec. In Canada they worked on a farm near Winnipeg in order to earn the money for food and equipment for their expedition. After that they travelled by Canadian National Railway via Edmonton northwards to Athabasca Landing. From there they took a boat and went ca. 250 km downstream (northwards) along Athabasca River towards their aimed destination, the primeval forests of Athabasca River, near the ancient Indian landing place Pelican Portage. Here they built their first log cabin, later they built a second cabin near House River.

In their first Canadian winter Naumann's and Hinsche's living conditions were dramatic. They suffered from hunger and severe frost (frostbite). Boat trips on the unpredictable Athabasca River nearly ended in disaster. Once Max Hinsche was suffering from a dangerous gunshot wound when Naumann together with Indians of Plains Cree (Paskwa Wi Iniwak) was able to save his companion's life. After the first winter they parted from each other for economic reasons. Naumann started his own way of life near Athabasca River 10 km downstream. In the summer months he lived on fishing, hunting and growing of arable crop, in winter on being a trapper and selling skins. He ran a trap line of up to a hundred kilometers. Naumann's Canadian citizenship was documented in 1938.

Naumann was not married. He had 15 children in several intimate relations, who were descended from the Plains Cree family line Cardinal. After the separation from the women he brought up five of his children as a single father in his log cabin in Pelican Portage: George, Hazel, Garry, Rose Mary and Jerry Naumann. Naumann died on June 6, 1978, at the age of 76 years in Athabasca, Canada – without ever returning to Germany. He is buried in the cemetery in Athabasca.

== Work ==
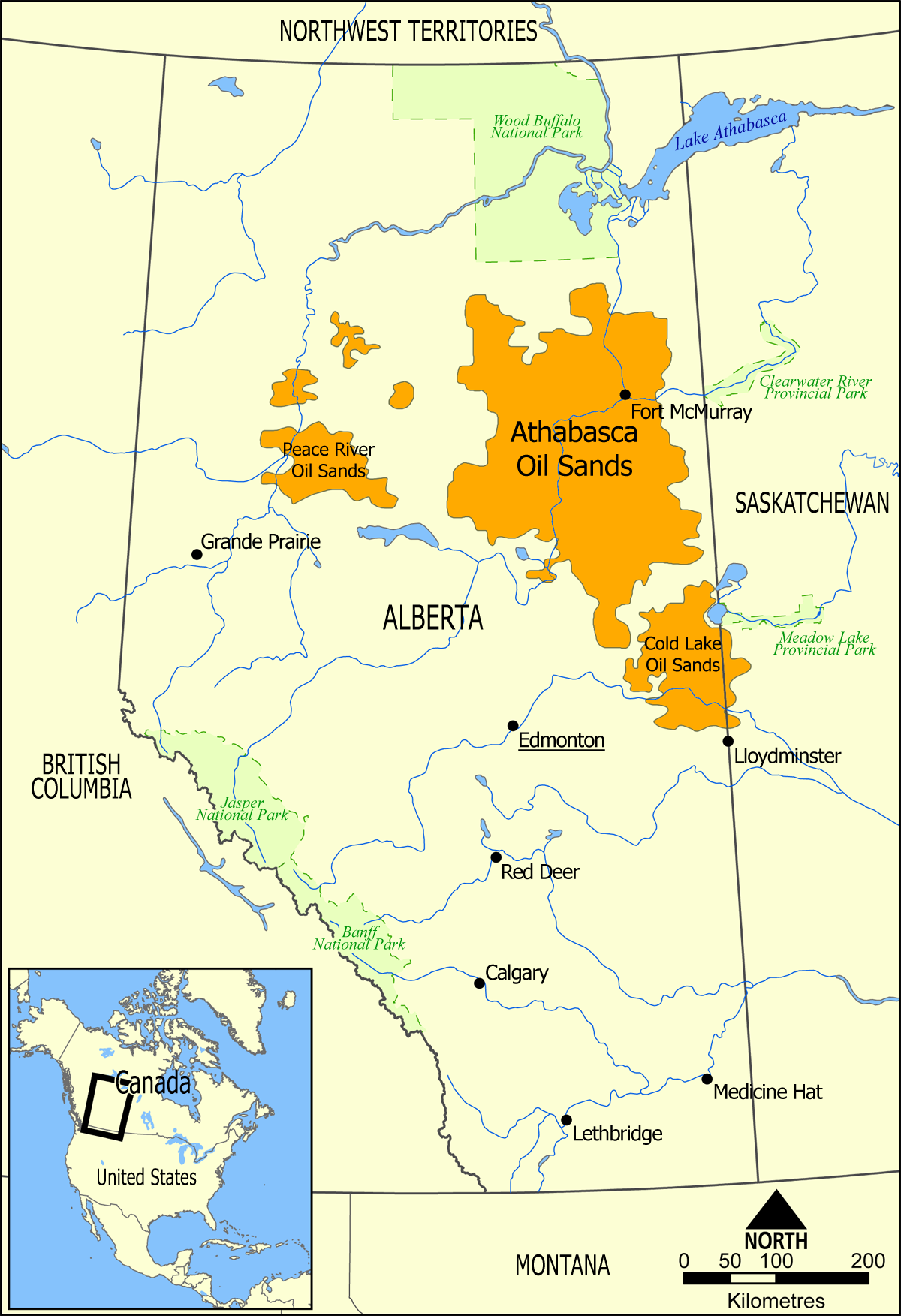
Athabasca – oil sand regions; Pelican Portage is situated in the centre of the Athabasca Oil Sands Region

Naumann noticed some constant escape of natural gas in the vicinity of his settlement. That had never been described before. His tests indicated gas resources from oil deposits, which were still unknown then. At that time Naumann covered long distances because he worked as a postmaster in the district of Athabasca/Alberta from 1949. His area of responsibility as a postmaster of the post office "Pelican Portage – Settlement" included – aside from correspondence and accountancy – the delivery of the mail by motor boat to the trappers and native inhabitants. Going about his daily work he discovered new leakage of gas time after time. There seemed to be rich deposits of oil in the ground layers. Being self-taught he did his researches empirically. For a long period he carried out his systematic analyses and structured tests from the catchment areas of the Athabasca River to the Fort McMurray decades before the boom in the oil business in Alberta in the 1970s. In this way he concluded from the constant leakage of gas that there had to be rich deposits of oil. At the same time used his pioneering work for his own needs.

Naumann's settlement was situated in the centre of the then unknown huge Athabasca-Oil sand deposits. He had put his discovery into practice already in the 1930s using it for his own needs in the first place. He put pipes vertically into the soil around his yard at Athabasca River. Then he set fire to the gases that were coming out of the soil containing oil sand. Using the warmth of the constant flames, he succeeded in growing rich crops in the cold climate of Canada. In this way he was not only able to grow vegetables and potatoes but even tomatoes and cucumbers, which were not growing otherwise there in the open. The authors David Halsey and Diana Landau, who were his guests during a tour of Canada in 1977/78, recorded that even potatoes and cabbage were even growing in late fall in Dick's unique garden, where they were protected against the cold by natural gas flames. They supported this fact with a photo of the flames. Because of his discoveries he got a special name in Alberta: "Dick Naumann of Upper Wells", whose property in the wildness at the Athabasca River could be seen from far away because of the flames, and whose hospitality for exhausted travellers was widely known as exceptional.

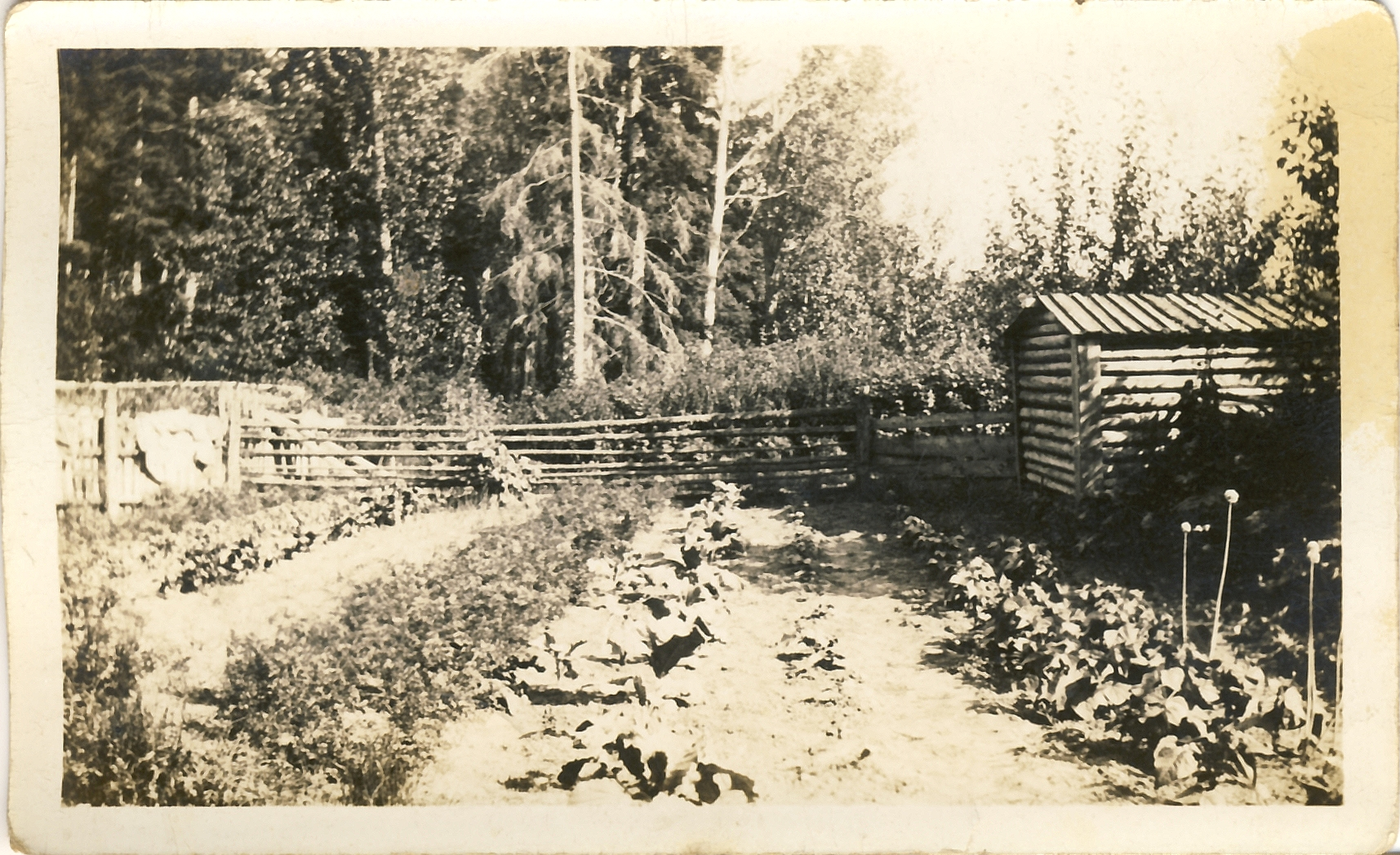
Naumann's first yard c. 1930, in the picture you can see his first "Natural gas flames" for heating, on the right

Later, when he was working as a sawmill manager, with a logging camp belonging to it, and as an owner of his own stores, he introduced that easy technique of gas production and its use. In this way he worked as a pioneer in this field. His new technique of using the natural gas allowed him not only to provide himself and his family with potatoes and vegetables but also to produce them in large amounts for the canteen of the sawmill and logging camp professionally. After the systematic extension of the gas exploitation the gas was used for all the engines, even for the washing machines. Naumann also used the natural gas for the production of warmth and electric energy. His invention didn't go unnoticed, and it laid the foundation for further scientific researches and tests carried out by the University of Calgary (Prof. V. Geist and his team). The scientists did geological and ecological fieldwork in that territory, which finally resulted in the extensive research and tapping of the many deposits of oil in Alberta. Naumann also worked as a cartographer, because the territory along the northern Athabasca River had been almost uninhabited and unexplored before. He played a leading role in working out exact maps for his work as a naturalist and for the further development of "Pelican Settlement" as well.

== See also ==
- Athabasca oil sands
- List of German Canadians
