= Harald Gimpel =

Medal record

Men's canoe slalom

Representing East Germany

Olympic Games
| Bronze medal – third place | 1972 Munich | K-1 |

World Championships
| Bronze medal – third place | 1975 Skopje | K-1 |
| Bronze medal – third place | 1975 Skopje | K-1 team |

Harald Gimpel (born 6 September 1951 in Wallendorf, Saxony-Anhalt) is a former East German slalom canoeist who competed in the 1970s. He won the bronze medal in the K-1 event at the 1972 Summer Olympics in Munich.

Gimpel also won two bronze medals at the 1975 ICF Canoe Slalom World Championships in Skopje in the K-1 event and the K-1 team event.
