= Jacob Gaukel Stroh =

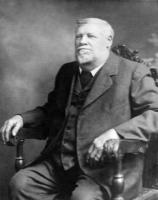
- Born: September 25, 1848; Berlin, Canada West
- Died: May 23, 1935 (aged 86); Waterloo, Ontario, Canada
- Burial place: Mount Hope Cemetery, Kitchener, Ontario, Canada
- Occupation(s): Tanner, historian
- Spouse: Elisabeth Seiler
- Children: 8
- Parents: Henry Stroh (father); Susannah Gaukel (mother)

Jacob Gaukel Stroh (25 September 1848 – 23 May 1935) was a local historian of Waterloo County, Ontario.

== Personal life ==
Jacob Gaukel Stroh was born in Berlin, Canada West on 25 September 1848 to Henry Stroh and Susannah Gaukel. His father, Henry Stroh, was from Hessen in what would become the Federal Republic of Germany. Henry moved to Waterloo Township by 1840, where he began to work as a shoemaker. Later, he became a local councillor for the growing town of Berlin, which would evolve into the present-day Kitchener, Ontario. Jacob's mother, Susannah, was born in Berlin in 1824. She was the daughter of Friedrich Gaukel, a prominent innkeeper and early landowner in Waterloo Township who was originally from Württemberg, which is now also a part of Germany.

On 7 May 1870, Jacob Stroh married Elisabeth Seiler, with whom he had eight children: Ida, Ella, Edward, Edgar, Edna, Olivia, Albertha and Nathaniel. He was a lifelong Swedenborgian who was associated with the Church of the New Jerusalem, which was located at the northeast corner of King Street West and Water Street North in Berlin.

== Professional life ==
Stroh grew up close to Gaukel's Hotel (later named the Walper Hotel) an establishment owned by his grandfather, Friedrich Gaukel. As a boy, Stroh would watch ceremonial dances performed by Mohawk patrons at the hotel, which subsequently spurred a lifelong interest in indigenous culture and local history.

In 1880, Stroh discovered a ruined fort north of the city of Waterloo, used by the local aboriginals. Stroh described it as containing 50 to 100 separate campsites each surrounded by a ditch. The fort, covering several acres, held hundreds of relics which were given to the Doon Pioneer Village.

In 1890, Stroh donated a grindstone used by natives to sharpen stone tools. Found at Gelennie's Springs, north of Conestogo, it weighed between 1000 and 1500 pounds. It was placed near an old log building in the park, which was the first schoolhouse in the town of Waterloo.

A tanner by trade, Stroh worked for the Breithaupt tannery in Guelph and the Lang tannery in Waterloo. Ultimately, he established his own tannery in Waterloo in 1911. During that time, Stroh would trade goods and services to local farmers who brought him artifacts found their fields.

Later in 1923 he donated another grindstone used by the natives to grind food. Found at Suraras Springs, south of Mannheim, it weighed approximately 2000 pounds. This stone was placed near the first donated stone, by the old schoolhouse.

Stroh also served as a member of the Waterloo Library Board for forty years and wrote articles for the eighteenth, nineteenth and twentieth annuals of the Waterloo Historical Society, both concerning the early history of Berlin, now Kitchener. Stroh also served as a member of a board that managed the financial affairs of the Carmel Church School.

== Bibliography ==
- "Biography: Frederick Gaukel". Sixteenth Annual Report of the Waterloo Historical Society (PDF) (Report). Waterloo, Ontario: Chronicle Press. 1928. pp. 86–89.
