= Hermann Kerckhoff =

Canoeist (1937–2023)

Hermann Walter Kerckhoff (December 27, 1937 – April 29, 2023) was a slalom canoeist who competed in the early 1970s. He finished 37th in the K-1 event at the 1972 Summer Olympics in Munich.

Born in Berlin, Germany, Kerckhoff immigrated to Canada in 1955. Along with his wife, he created Canada's first whitewater paddling school, Madawaska Kanu Centre, and OWL Rafting. His daughter, Claudia, is a 10-time Canadian slalom champion.

== See also ==
- List of German Canadians
