= Mario Di Stazio =

Italian canoeist (born 1951)

Mario Di Stazio (born 25 May 1951 in Edolo) is an Italian retired slalom canoeist who competed from the late 1960s to the mid-1970s. He finished 17th in the K-1 event at the 1972 Summer Olympics in Munich.
