= Edi (given name) =

Edi is a given name. Notable people with the given name include:

- Edi Angelillo (born 1961), Italian actress
- Edi Buro (born 1987), Bosnian-American soccer player
- Edi Çajku (born 1982), Albanian footballer
- Edi Dadić (born 1993), Croatian cross country skier
- Edi Danilo Guerra (born 1987), Guatemalan footballer
- Edi Gathegi (born 1979), American actor
- Edi Federer (1955–2012), Austrian ski jumper
- Edi Fitzroy (1955–2017), Jamaican reggae singer
- Edi Hafid (born 1983), Indonesian footballer
- Edi Heiz (born 1947), Swiss canoeist
- Edi Hrnic (born 2003), Danish taekwondo practitioner
- Edi Kurnia (born 1983), Indonesian footballer
- Edi Kurniawan (born 1988), Indonesian weightlifter
- Edi Maia (born 1987), Portuguese pole vaulter
- Edi Mall (1924–2014), Austrian alpine skier
- Edi Martini (born 1975), Albanian football manager and player
- Edi Orioli (born 1962), Italian motorcycle racer
- Edi Paloka (born 1965), Albanian politician
- Edi Patterson, American actress
- Edi Ponoš (born 1976), Croatian javelin thrower
- Edi Rama (born 1964), Albanian politician
- Edi Schild (born 1919), Swiss cross-country skier
- Edi Scholdan (c. 1911–1961), Austrian figure skater
- Edi Sinadinović (born 1988), Serbian basketball player
- Edi Stecher, Austrian Righteous Among the Nations
- Edi Stöhr (born 1956), German football manager and player
- Edi Subaktiar (born 1994), Indonesian badminton player
- Edi Ziegler (born 1930), German road racing cyclist
