= Marián Havlíček =

Slovak slalom canoeist

Personal information
- Nationality: Slovak
- Born: 19 April 1953 Zvolen, Czechoslovakia
- Died: 30 December 1972 (aged 19) Prašivá, Czechoslovakia
- Height: 1.81 m (5 ft 11 in)
- Weight: 83 kg (183 lb)

Sport
- Country: Czechoslovakia
- Sport: Canoe slalom
- Event: K1

Marián Havlíček (19 April 1953 – 30 December 1972) was a Slovak slalom canoeist who competed internationally for Czechoslovakia from 1971 until his death in 1972.

He appeared in his first international competition at the age of 18, when he finished 17th in the K1 event and 5th in the K1 team event at the 1971 World Championships. He then competed at the 1972 Summer Olympics in Munich, where he finished sixth in the K1 event.

He died at the age of 19 in an accident after falling on the ice on Prašivá, a mountain in the Low Tatras.
