= Yusuke Okada =

Yusuke Okada may refer to:

- Yusuke Okada (basketball)
- Yusuke Okada (wrestler)
