= Shoken Okada =

Japanese canoeist (born 1947)

Shoken Okada (岡田 昌憲, Okada Shōken; born July 30, 1947) is a Japanese retired slalom canoeist who competed in the early 1970s. He finished 36th in the K-1 event at the 1972 Summer Olympics in Munich.
