= Edi Heiz =

Swiss canoeist (born 1947)

Eduard "Edi" Heiz (born 10 March 1947) is a Swiss retired slalom canoeist who competed from the late 1960s to the early 1970s. He finished 13th in the K-1 event at the 1972 Summer Olympics in Munich.
