= Giuseppe D'Angelo (slalom canoeist) =

Italian canoeist (born 1951)

Giuseppe D'Angelo (born 17 November 1951) is an Italian retired slalom canoeist who competed in the early-to-mid 1970s. He finished 18th in the K-1 event at the 1972 Summer Olympics in Munich. He was born in Ivrea.
