= Dubravko Mataković (canoeist) =

Yugoslav slalom canoeist (1942–2019)

Dubravko Mataković (18 January 1942 – 15 October 2019) was a Yugoslav slalom canoeist who competed from the mid-1960s to the early 1980s. He finished 25th in the K-1 event at the 1972 Summer Olympics in Munich.
