= Roberto D'Angelo =

Italian canoeist (born 1945)

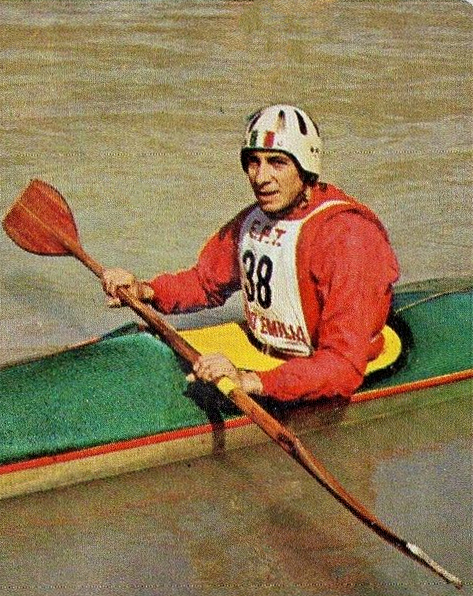

Personal information
- Born: 21 June 1945 (age 81) Bollengo, Italy
- Height: 1.70 m (5 ft 7 in)
- Weight: 64 kg (141 lb)

Sport
- Sport: Slalom canoeing

Roberto D'Angelo (born 21 June 1945) is a retired Italian slalom canoeist who competed from the mid-1960s to the mid-1970s. He finished 12th in the K-1 event at the 1972 Summer Olympics in Munich.
