= Pelican Portage, Alberta =

Settlement in northern Alberta, Canada

Coordinates: 55.80025°N 112.61673°W

Location of Pelican Portage in Alberta

Pelican Portage is a settlement in northern Alberta, Canada within the Municipal District of Opportunity No. 17.

It is located on the Athabasca River, approximately 128 kilometers (80 mi) southwest of Fort McMurray. It has an elevation of 550 meters (1,800 ft).

It is near Pelican Rapids, where the Pelican and Athabasca Rivers converge.

In 1894, a government-sponsored drilling project discovered a reservoir of natural gas. The gas pouring from this well was uncontrolled and continued to blow wild for twenty one years, sometimes igniting. This made it a popular tourist attraction.

From 1927, Georg Naumann served as the postmaster for Pelican Portage as part of his work for the District of Athabasca / Alberta with private office.

== See also ==
- List of communities in Alberta
- List of settlements in Alberta
