= Yuki Okada =

Yuki Okada may refer to:

- Yuki Okada (footballer, born 1983) (岡田 佑樹), Japanese footballer
- Yuki Okada (footballer, born 1996) (岡田 優希), Japanese footballer

== See also ==
- Yūki Okada (悠希 岡田) (born 2000)
