= Rottenmann =

Rottenmann Rottnmau
- Municipality
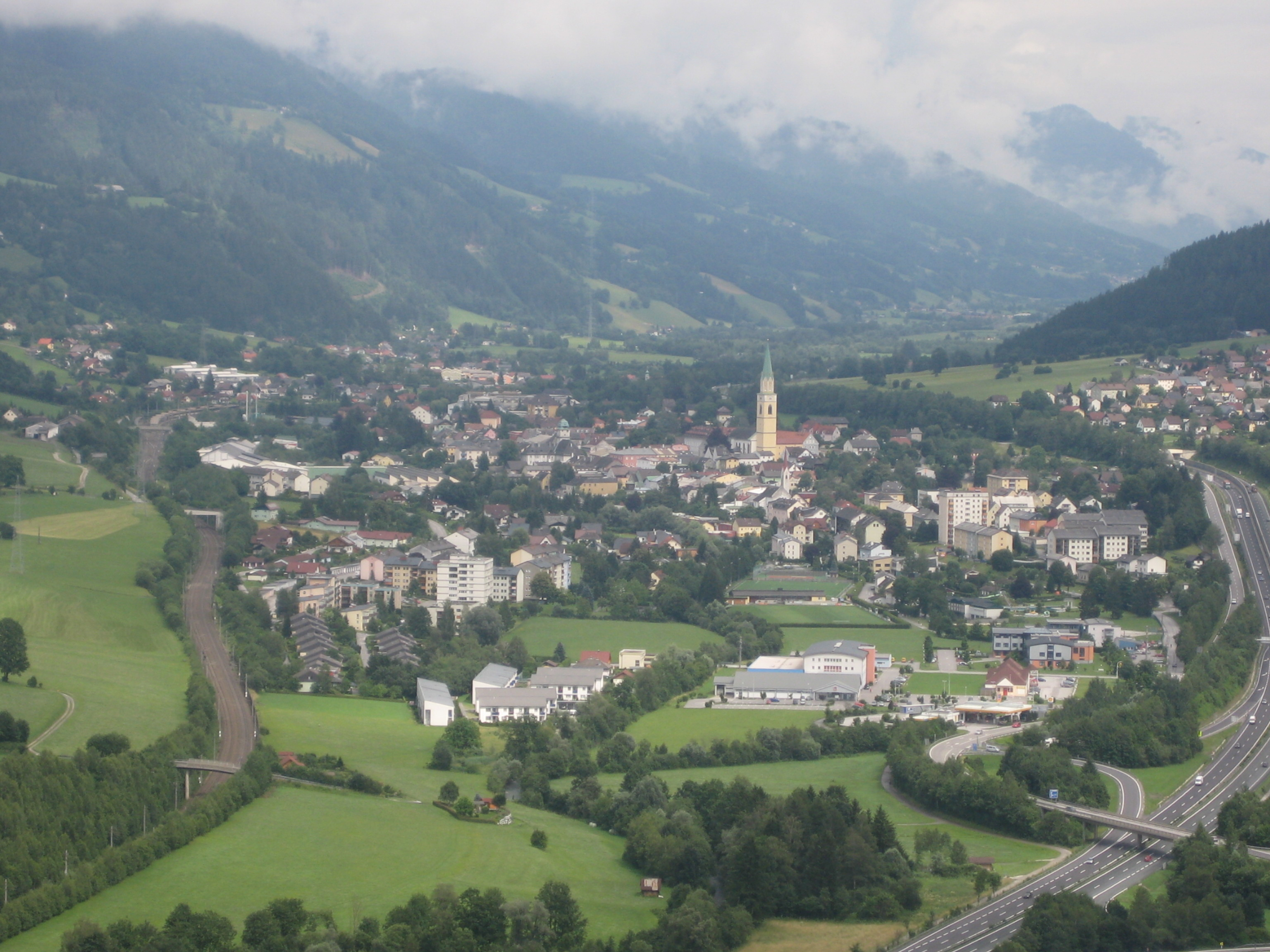
- Rottenmann seen from the Strechau Castle

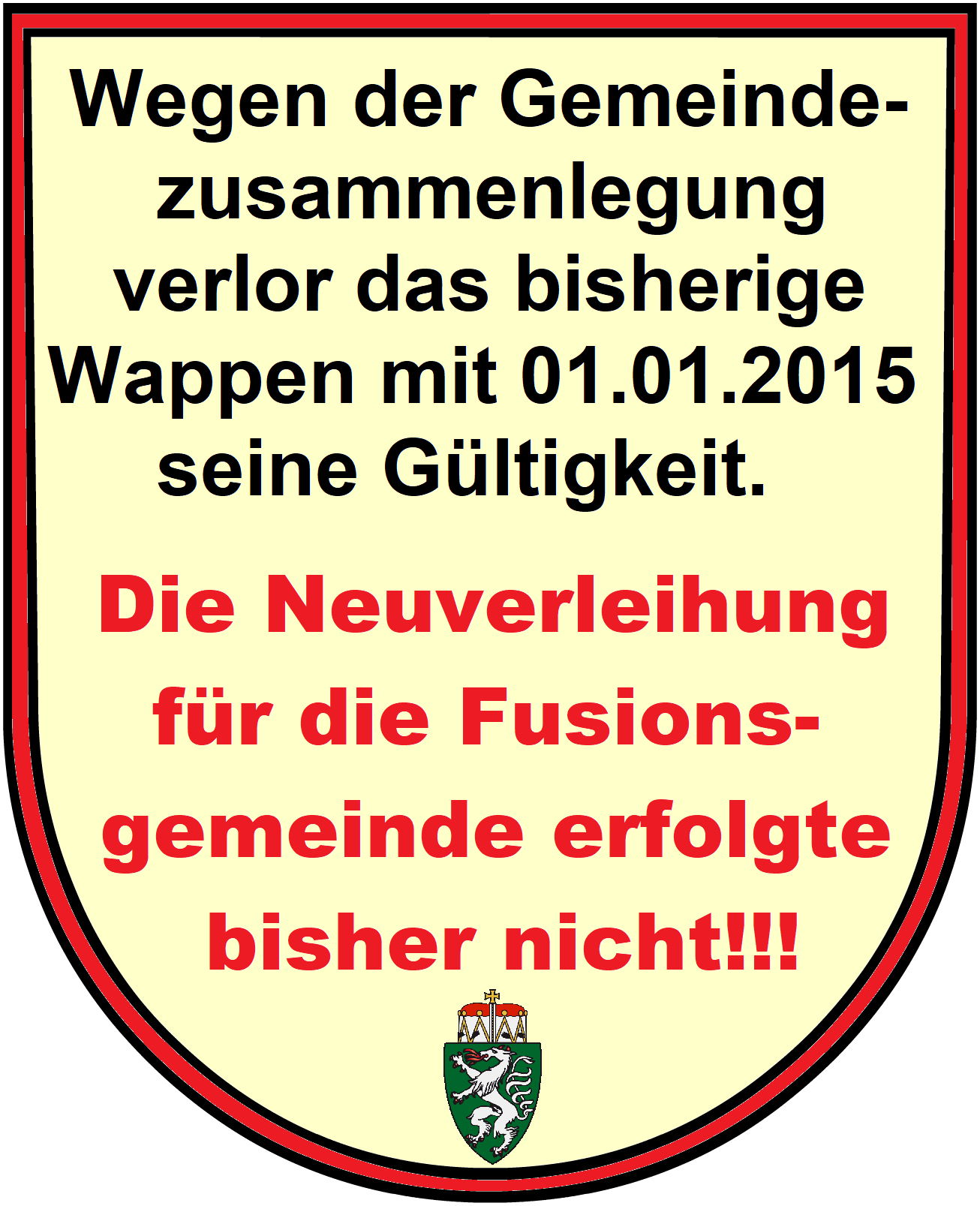
- Coat of arms

- Location within Austria
- Coordinates: 47°31′36″N 14°21′21″E
- Country: Austria
- State: Styria
- District: Liezen

Government
  - Mayor: Günter Gangl (ÖVP)

Area
  - Total: 205.48 km^{2} (79.34 sq mi)
- Elevation: 681 m (2,234 ft)

Population (2018-01-01)
  - Total: 5,232
  - Density: 25.46/km^{2} (65.95/sq mi)
- Time zone: UTC+1 (CET)
  - Summer (DST): UTC+2 (CEST)
- Postal code: 8786
- Area code: +43 3614
- Vehicle registration: LI
- Website: rottenmann.at

Rottenmann (German: [ˈʁotn̩.man]; Central Bavarian: Rottnmau) is a town in Styria in Austria, near the Rottenmanner Tauern. Rottenmann was first referred to in a document in 927. It received its town charter in 1279 from King Rudolf von Habsburg.

== Name ==
The name Rottenmann is a semi-translation of old Slavic *čьrmьn′ane, ultimately derived from the adjective *čьrmьnъ 'red' (cf. German rot 'red'). The place name was recorded in 1048 as Cirminah, derived from the hydronym *Čьrmьna 'red (river)'.

== Population ==
Historical population
Year	Pop.	±%
1869	3,080	—
1880	3,114	+1.1%
1890	3,069	−1.4%
1900	3,790	+23.5%
1910	4,630	+22.2%
1923	4,749	+2.6%
1934	4,971	+4.7%
1939	4,678	−5.9%
1951	4,858	+3.8%
1961	4,896	+0.8%
1971	5,588	+14.1%
1981	5,420	−3.0%
1991	5,431	+0.2%
2001	5,489	+1.1%
2011	5,154	−6.1%
2021	5,111	−0.8%
