= Weight loss coaching =

Helping persons to reach their weight goals

Coaches are professional tutors who have expertise in their preferred area of study. Weight loss coaches, specifically, have clientele within the health and fitness industry.

A weight loss coach’s job is commonly described as a personal trainer. They fulfill the needs of individuals in order to help them reach their weight (or fitness) goals. This may include, but is not limited to, exercise and meal preparation.

== Early days ==
Back in the early 1800s is when the slang “coaching” came into play. Before, these individuals were just known as tutors. The early definition of a coach was someone who “carries” another person through tasks. Originally used in reference to schoolwork, the definition broadened into the various coaches we are familiar with today.

William Banting was a funeral director and a coffin maker from the early 19th century. He is well known for being the author of a booklet called Letter on Corpulence, Addressed to the Public. This booklet contained some of the earliest knowledge of weight loss dieting. This letter is like a journal that includes all the different regimes Banting tried until finding one that worked. From all the fails, came the low-carb diet breakthrough which is still heavily researched and used today.

In 1978 Susie Orbach published her book Fat is a Feminist Issue. One of the first texts to highlight the relationship between behavior, culture and weight gain. In her book Susie looks at how food becomes associated with love, comfort and nurture and how this can manifest in overeating behaviors. For a long time, it has been recognized that attitude can have an impact upon the maintenance of a healthy weight.

=== Methods ===
Coaches use many techniques. Borrowing the concept of modeling from NLP, a weight loss coach will identify the behaviors associated with those of normal weight individuals and help the overweight individual to adopt many of these behaviors for themselves. The process will involve establishing which of the behaviors will serve the individual best and how to make it easier to follow such helpful behaviors.

A coach will also work with the individual to establish what their original beliefs, values and behaviors associated with food and their diet are. These can be explored with a view to adopting adaptations of these beliefs and behaviors that will be beneficial to the individual, whilst losing those that are not beneficial. The coach can also help to motivate with their desire to lose weight.

These professionals help set realistic goals for weight loss and develop a plan to attain the goals. This plan can include actions, research and education. The plan is also driven by the individual, so it is tailored to them and not a "one size fits all" plan. The coach will help to consolidate all the ideas of the individual into steps which take them towards losing weight.

Alongside food, key factors of weight loss are exercise. This includes many forms of cardio, and strength training.

Coaches chose to work in a variety of methods. The most common is one-to-one coaching, either by telephone or face to face. Some coaches work in groups running classes and workshops. Less common is e-coaching, which is working via email, webinars and instant messaging. Some coaches are beginning to launch on line courses, where email support and exercises are given to the individual for them to work on in their own time.

== Not just food ==
Weight loss coaching recognizes that it is not just food that leads to weight gain. Exercise has long been associated with weight management but less known associations like sleep, particularly in teenagers, and stress, have also been shown to affect the body's ability to lose weight.

== Research ==
Interactive health coaching interventions have been studied for their effect on weight loss in obese adult employees and has shown to be effective. E-coaching for weight loss has also been studied and has been shown to be effective. Findings from a 2014 systematic review suggest counseling, either in-person or by phone, by trained medical interventionists may also be effective in inducing weight loss in patients. Weight loss and malnutrition in COVID-19 patients found connected in the research. According to the Journal of Medical Internet Research, experiments were done with real individuals to see the effects of coaching in relation to weight loss. Julie Kennel talk about a similar topic in her article called Health and Wellness Coaching Improves Weight and Nutrition Behaviors.
