= List of ICF Canoe Slalom World Championships medalists in mixed canoe =

This is a list of medalists from the ICF Canoe Slalom World Championships in mixed canoe.

== C2 ==
Debuted: 1955. Not held: 1979. Reinstated: 1981. Discontinued: 1981. Reinstated: 2017.

Championships	Gold	Silver	Bronze
1955 Tacen	Czechoslovakia; Dana Martanová; Jiří Pecka	France; Simone Gavinet; René Gavinet	Czechoslovakia; Jarmila Pacherová; Miroslav Čihák
1957 Augsburg	East Germany; Brigitte Schmidt; Manfred Glöckner	East Germany; Ellen Krügel; Siegfried Seidemann	East Germany; Waltraud Schale; Rudolf Seifert
1959 Geneva	East Germany; Rita Behrend; Manfred Merkel	East Germany; Margitta Troger; Günther Merkel	East Germany; Ellen Krügel; Siegfried Seidemann
1961 Hainsberg	Czechoslovakia; Vratislava Nováková; Karel Novák	East Germany; Edith Nickel; Willi Landers	Czechoslovakia; Jarmila Pacherová; Václav Nič
1963 Spittal	Yugoslavia; Alenka Bernot; Borut Justin	East Germany; Margitta Krüger; Werner Lempert	Czechoslovakia; Vratislava Nováková; Karel Novák
1965 Spittal	Czechoslovakia; Ludmilla Sirotková; Václav Janoušek	Czechoslovakia; Jiřina Šedivcová; Josef Šedivec	East Germany; Erika Schönfeld; Horst Wängler
1967 Lipno	Czechoslovakia; Jaroslava Krčálová; Milan Svoboda	East Germany; Erika Uhlig; Horst Wängler	East Germany; Edith Grabo; Uwe Franz
1969 Bourg St.-Maurice	Czechoslovakia; Jitka Traplová; Milan Svoboda	France; Jarka Lutz; Claude Lutz	Czechoslovakia; Hana Křížková; Jiří Koudela
1971 Meran	Czechoslovakia; Hana Koudelová; Jiří Koudela	Czechoslovakia; Jitka Legatová; Milan Svoboda	Czechoslovakia; Ludmilla Sirotková; Jiří Krejza
1973 Muotathal	United States; Carol Knight; Dave Knight	United States; Barbara Holcombe; Norman Holcombe	Netherlands; Ria van Stipdonk; Peter van Stipdonk
1975 Skopje	United States; Marietta Gillman; Chuck Lyda	United States; Rasa Dentremont; George Lhota	United States; Mikki Piras; Steve Draper
1977 Spittal	United States; Marietta Gillman; Chuck Lyda	United States; Linda Aponte; John Kennedy	Australia; Kym Purdy; Stuart Dry
1981 Bala	United States; Elizabeth Hayman; Fritz Haller	United States; Barbara McKee; John Sweet	United States; Karen Marte; Brett Sorensen
2017 Pau	France; Margaux Henry; Yves Prigent	Italy; Niccolo Ferrari; Stefanie Horn	Czech Republic; Veronika Vojtová; Jan Mašek
2018 Rio de Janeiro	Poland; Marcin Pochwała; Aleksandra Stach	France; Yves Prigent; Margaux Henry	Czech Republic; Veronika Vojtová; Jan Mašek
2019 La Seu d'Urgell	Czech Republic; Tereza Fišerová; Jakub Jáně	Poland; Aleksandra Stach; Marcin Pochwała	Czech Republic; Jan Mašek; Veronika Vojtová

- Medal table

Rank	Nation	Gold	Silver	Bronze	Total
1	Czechoslovakia	6	2	5	13
2	United States (USA)	4	4	2	10
3	East Germany	2	5	4	11
4	France (FRA)	1	3	0	4
5	Poland (POL)	1	1	0	2
6	Czech Republic (CZE)	1	0	3	4
7	Yugoslavia	1	0	0	1
8	Italy (ITA)	0	1	0	1
9	Australia (AUS)	0	0	1	1
9	Netherlands (NED)	0	0	1	1
Totals (10 entries)		16	16	16	48

== C2 team ==
Debuted: 1957. Not held: 1959–63. Reinstated: 1965. Not held: 1967. Reinstated: 1969. Discontinued: 1969.

Championships	Gold	Silver	Bronze
1957 Augsburg	East Germany; Waltraud Schale & Rudolf Seifert; Margot Seidler & Helmut Schmieder; Brigitte Schmidt & Manfred Glöckner	France; Bonnaud & Thezier; Henriette Guette & Jean Olry; E. Spahr & M. Spahr	–
1965 Spittal	East Germany; Edith Grabo & Werner Lempert; Monika Lehmann & Rolf Müller; Erika Schönfeld & Horst Wängler	Czechoslovakia; Milada Absolonová & Antonín Absolon; Ludmilla Sirotková & Václav Janoušek; Jiřina Šedivcová & Josef Šedivec	France; Simone Blanc & Gérard Ghidini; Michele Olry & Michel Berthenet; Henriette Guette & Jean Olry
1969 Bourg St.-Maurice	Czechoslovakia; Jitka Traplová & Milan Svoboda; Hana Křížková & Jiří Koudela; Alena Prouzová & Petr Horyna	France; Françoise Labarelle & Ernest Labarelle; Jarka Lutz & Claude Lutz; Marie-France Curtil & Daniel Curtil	United States; Louise Wright & Paul Liebman; Nancy Southworth & Tom Southworth; Gay Fawcett & Mark Fawcett

- Medal table

Rank	Nation	Gold	Silver	Bronze	Total
1	East Germany	2	0	0	2
2	Czechoslovakia	1	1	0	2
3	France (FRA)	0	2	1	3
4	United States (USA)	0	0	1	1
Totals (4 entries)		3	3	2	8
