= Philadelphia Canoe Club =

U.S. non-profit paddling club

Coordinates: 40.013598°N 75.207506°W

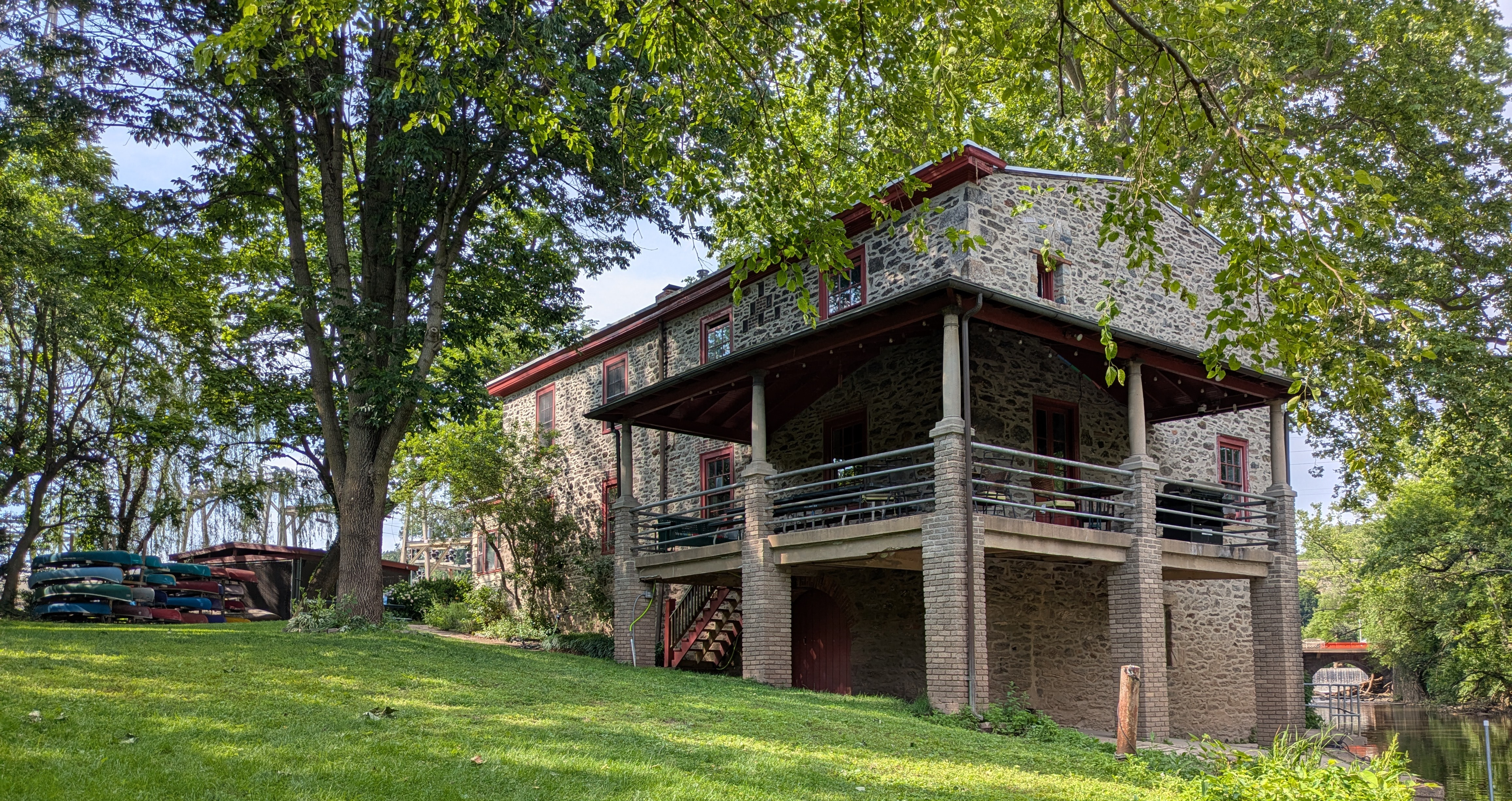
- The clubhouse and grounds
- Formation: 1905
- Purpose: promoting paddle sports
- Location: 4900 Ridge Avenue, Philadelphia, United States
- Members: approx. 250
- Commodore: Todd Zielinski (2025)
- Affiliations: American Canoe Association
- Award: ACA Stroke of Achievement Award (2005, 2000)
- Website: philacanoe.org

The Philadelphia Canoe Club (PCC), founded in 1905, is one of the oldest paddling organizations in the United States. Headquartered in a 17th-century mill at the confluence of the Wissahickon Creek and Schuylkill River in Manayunk, Philadelphia, PCC counts among its members more than 200 canoeists, kayakers, and stand-up paddleboarders. The nonprofit club offers classes in all these disciplines at a variety of levels and styles.

== Activities ==
PCC is a nonprofit organization with a mission of promoting recreational and competitive paddle sports by allowing more people to improve their skills and safety in paddling. All of the club's activities are open to members and nonmembers alike.

PCC offers classes in paddling canoes, kayaks, and stand-up paddleboards in whitewater as well as flat and gently moving water. The classes are taught by volunteers, and the club's training stresses technique and safety. The instructors are trained by the American Canoe Association (ACA) and certified in wilderness first aid. The club's training program won recognition from the ACA, which awarded it its Stroke of Achievement Award for superior performance and program development in 2000 and 2005. The Class II whitewater section of the Schuylkill between Flat Rock Dam and the club is used for whitewater training and practice.

Members organize paddling trips, both official club trips that are advertised to the public, and unofficial pick-up trips. In the winters, the club organizes pool sessions, where paddlers can practice rolling, with or without the help of an instructor. Social events at the club include an annual open house, featuring a barbecue, music, boat rides, and a used boat and gear sale, and an annual square dance and dinner around Thanksgiving. The club partners with other organizations to clean up trash from Philadelphia's waterways.

== History ==
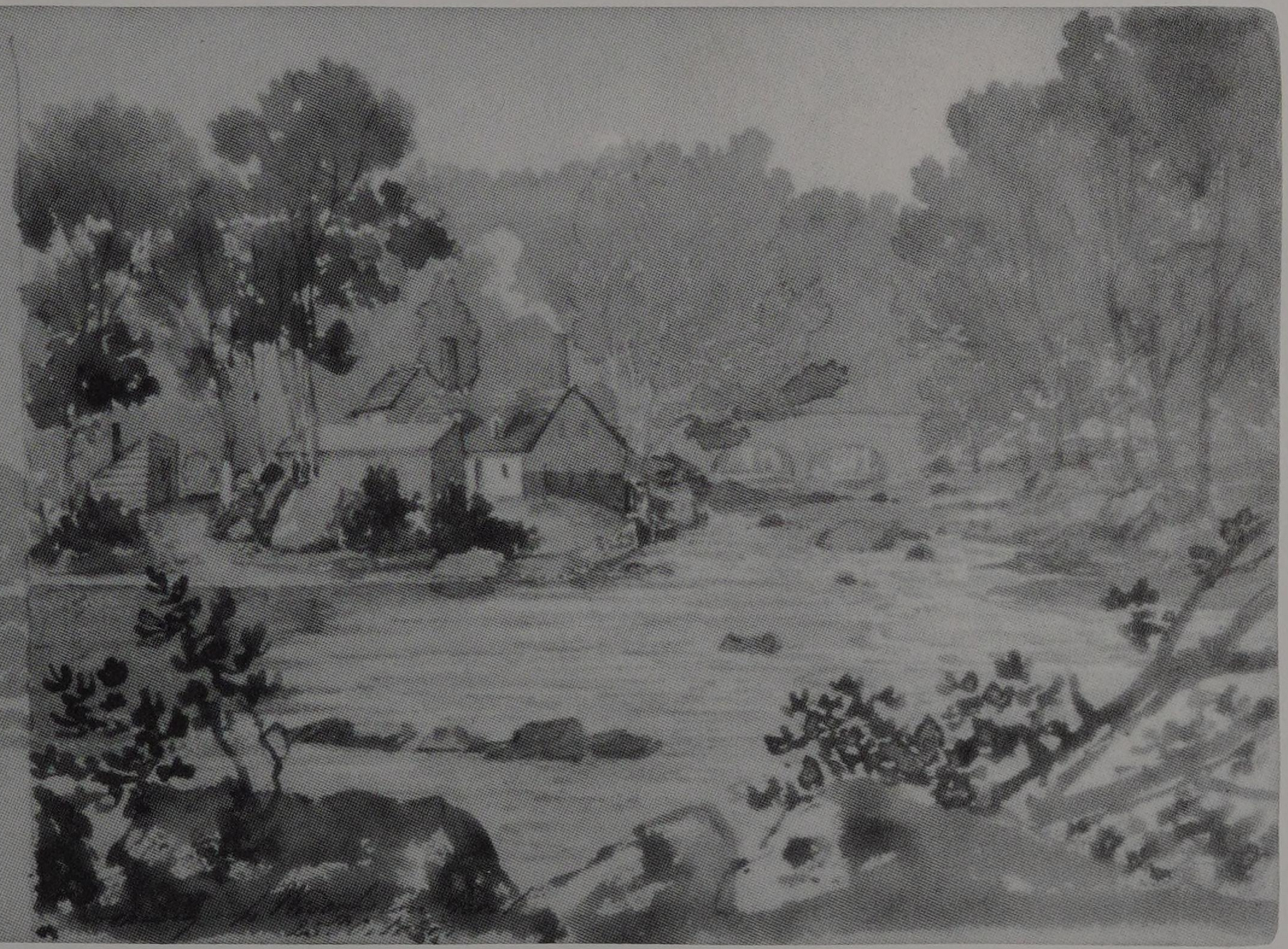
The Robeson rolling mill in 1815

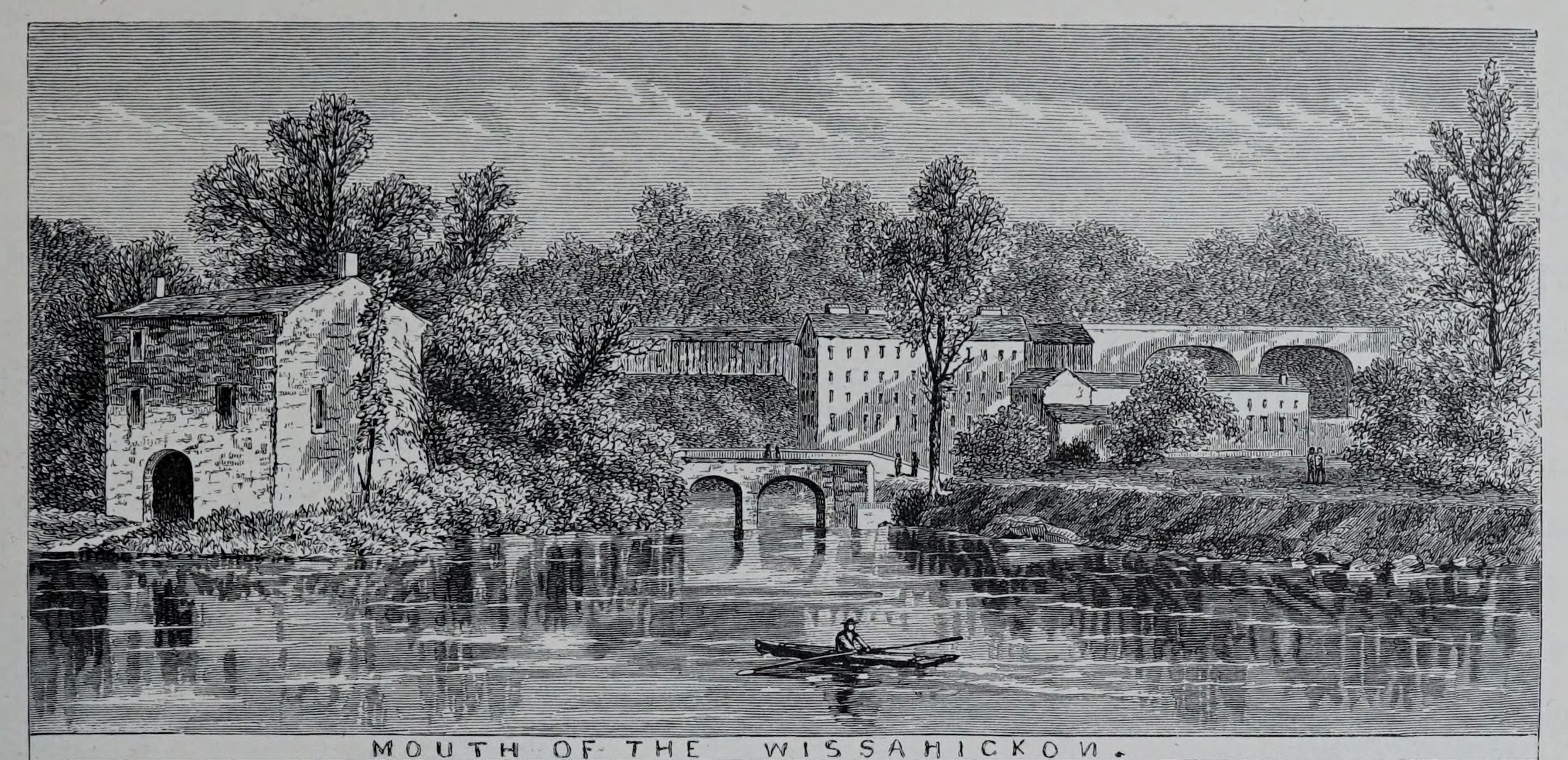
The mill (left) circa 1872

The mill building currently serving as the home of PCC was probably erected by 1690 as a grist mill. It was part of a complex of mills built on a 500-acre parcel called Shoomac Park, operated initially by Andrew Robeson. Shoomac Park remained in the Robeson family for 150 years. Around 1800, the grist mill was converted to a rolling mill and later was used to mill logwood for dyes. In the 1869, Fairmount Park acquired the mill, as it later did with all mills along the Wissahickon. In 1876 the building was leased to the State in Schuylkill and served as its clubhouse until 1887. The State in Schuylkill abandoned their lease in 1902 after a flood inundated the building. The clubhouse is still commonly referred to as Colony Castle even long after its affiliation with the Colony in Schuylkill (another name used by the State in Schuylkill). Since 1905 Fairmount Park has leased the building to the Canoe Club. The club pays nominal rent of $1 a year but is responsible for the maintenance of the historic building and grounds. Of the dozens of mills that were once in operation along Wissahickon Creek, the PCC clubhouse is the only one still standing.

The clubhouse is full of markers of the club's long history: from the 34-foot Old Town war canoe hanging from the rafters, built in 1911 and which the club still paddles annually at its June meeting, to the high-water lines of various flood that inundated the building over the years, marked on the center pillar of the main room. The focus of the club has shifted over the years to reflect members' interests, most notably, under the influence of Paul Liebman, who, in the 1970s revitalized the club's commitment to paddlesport education and instruction and initiated the club's involvement in whitewater paddling. In those days, with no commercial whitewater kayaks available, PCC members would build their own fiber glass boats from molds at the club.

== Prominent Members ==
=== Olympians ===
- Russ McNutt, competed in the 1936 Summer Olympics
- Robert Graf, competed in the 1936 Summer Olympics
- Frank Krick, competed in the 1952 and 1956 Summer Olympics
- John Haas, competed in the 1952 and 1956 Summer Olympics
- Tom Southworth, competed in the 1972 Summer Olympics
- John Burton, competed in the 1972 Summer Olympics

=== ICF Canoe Slalom World Championships medalists ===
- Paul Liebman, Louise Wright, Nancy Southworth, Carol Knight, Dave Knight, and Linda Harrison.
