= Šedivec (surname) =

Šedivec (feminine: Šedivcová) is a Czech surname. Notable people with the surname include:

- Jaroslav Šedivec (born 1981), Czech footballer
- Jiřina Šedivcová (born 1940), Czechoslovak-American canoeist
- Josef Šedivec, Czechoslovak-American canoeist
