= Trenchant =

Trenchant may refer to:

== People ==
- Michel Trenchant (born 1945), French slalom canoeist
- Jean Trenchant (fl. 1570), French mathematician

== Companies ==
- The cybersecurity and surveillance technology division of L3Harris

== See also ==
- HMS Trenchant, several ships of the Royal Navy
