= Curtil =

Curtil may refer to:

== People ==
- Daniel Curtil, French canoeist
- Emmanuel Curtil, French actor
- Marie-France Curtil, French canoeist

== Places ==
- Curtil-Saint-Seine, Côte-d'Or department, France
- Curtil-Vergy, Côte-d'Or department, France
- Curtil-sous-Buffières, Bourgogne-Franche-Comté, France
- Curtil-sous-Burnand, Bourgogne-Franche-Comté, France
