= Olry =

Olry may refer to:

- Jean-Claude Olry (born 1949), French slalom canoeist who competed in the late 1960s and early 1970s
- Jean-Louis Olry (born 1946), French slalom canoeist who competed in the late 1960s and early 1970s
- Olry Terquem (1782–1862), French mathematician who proved Feuerbach's theorem about the nine-point circle of a triangle
- Port Olry, Francophone town (population 1300) on Espiritu Santo island in the Sanma Province of Vanuatu
- René Olry CLH (1880–1944), French general and commander of the Army of the Alps during the Battle of France of World War II
