= Villeneuve (surname) =

Villeneuve is a French surname based on a toponym that means New City or New Town. Variations include: de Villeneuve or Devilleneuve, which means from New City / from New Town.

== People ==
Persons with this surname include:

- Andrew Villeneuve, founder and executive director the Northwest Progressive Institute in the U.S.
- Anne Villeneuve (illustrator) (born 1966), Canadian writer and illustrator
- Anne Villeneuve (scientist), American geneticist
- Annie Villeneuve (born 1983), singer from Quebec, Canada
- Arnaud de Ville-Neuve (1240–1311), also known as Arnaldus de Villa Nova, a physician and religious reformer
- Carel de Villeneuve (1897–1974), Dutch lawyer and public servant in Indonesia
- Denis Villeneuve (born 1967), film director
- Francine Villeneuve (born 1964), Canadian horse racing pioneer and thoroughbred jockey
- Gabrielle-Suzanne Barbot de Villeneuve (1695–1755), French writer
- Gilles Villeneuve (1950–1982), former Formula One driver
- Jacques Villeneuve (born 1971), racing driver, son of Gilles
- Jacques Villeneuve (racing driver, born 1953), racing driver and world champion snowmobile racer, brother of Gilles
- Jean-Marie-Rodrigue Villeneuve (1883–1947), Canadian Cardinal, Archbishop of Quebec
- Jérôme Pétion de Villeneuve (1756–1794), French writer and politician
- Julien Vallou de Villeneuve (1795–1866), French photographer
- Justin de Villeneuve, 1960s British celebrity, boyfriend and manager of the model Twiggy
- Louis Villeneuve, Canadian politician
- Louis Devilleneuve, French canoeist
- Moe Villeneuve (born 1932), American politician
- Noble Villeneuve (born 1938–2018), Canadian politician
- Pierre Devilleneuve, French canoeist
- Pierre-Charles Villeneuve (1763–1806), French admiral during the Napoleonic Wars
- Raymond Villeneuve (born 1943), political activist in Canada

== See also ==
- Christian de Villeneuve-Esclapon (1852–1931), French politician
- Christophe de Villeneuve-Bargemon (1771–1829), French public official
- Villeneuve (disambiguation)
