= Žitnik =

Žitnik (Slovenia) or Žitník (Czech Republic) is a surname. Notable people with the surname include:

- Boštjan Žitnik (born 1971), Slovene canoer
- Franc Žitnik (born 1941), Yugoslav canoeist
- Leon Žitnik (born 1937), Yugoslav canoeist
- Tilen Žitnik (born 1991), Slovene tennis player
