= Janez Andrejašič =

Yugoslav slalom canoeist (born 1943)

Medal record

Men's canoe slalom

Representing Yugoslavia

World Championships
Silver medal – second place	1965 Spittal	C-2 team

Janez Andrejašič (born 26 March 1943 in Ljubljana) is a retired Yugoslav slalom canoeist of Slovenian nationality who competed from the early 1960s to the mid-1970s. He won a silver medal in the C-2 team event at the 1965 ICF Canoe Slalom World Championships in Spittal with Jože Gerkman, and finished sixth in the C-2 event at the 1972 Summer Olympics in Munich with Peter Guzelj.
