= Raymond Calverley =

British canoeist (born 1951)

Medal record

Men's slalom canoeing

Representing Great Britain

World Championships
Silver medal – second place	1969 Bourg St.-Maurice	K-1 team

Raymond R. "Ray" Calverley (born 3 April 1951 in Haslingden) is a British retired slalom canoeist who competed from the late 1960s to the mid-1970s. He won a silver medal in the K-1 team event at the 1969 ICF Canoe Slalom World Championships in Bourg St.-Maurice.

Calverley finished 32nd in the K-1 event at the 1972 Summer Olympics in Munich.

Calverley was a graduate of Fitzwilliam College, Cambridge.
