= Rosener =

Rosener is a surname. Notable people with the surname include:

- Ann Rosener (1914–2012), American photojournalist
- George Rosener (1884–1945), American actor
- Jason Rosener (born 1975), American alpine skier
- Werner Rosener, West German canoeist

== See also ==
- Rosner
- Rossner
