= Uhlich =

Uhlich is a surname. Notable people with the surname include:

- Leberecht Uhlich (1799–1872), German clergyman
- Rhys Uhlich (born 1983), Australian male model

== See also ==
- Ulich
- Uhlig
