= Claude Baux =

French retired slalom canoeist

Medal record

Men's canoe slalom

Representing France

World Championships
Bronze medal – third place	1969 Bourg St.-Maurice	C-1 team

Claude Baux (born 27 August 1945) is a French retired slalom canoeist who competed in the 1960s and 1970s. He won a bronze medal in the C-1 team event at the 1969 ICF Canoe Slalom World Championships in Bourg St.-Maurice. Baux also finished 15th in the C-1 event at the 1972 Summer Olympics in Munich.

== Bibliography ==
- Sports-reference.com profile
