= Alain Colombe =

French retired slalom canoeist

Medal record

Men's slalom canoeing

Representing France

World Championships
Gold medal – first place	1969 Bourg St.-Maurice	K-1 team

Alain Colombe (born 13 September 1949) is a French retired slalom canoeist who competed in the 1960s and the 1970s. He won a gold medal in the K-1 team event at the 1969 ICF Canoe Slalom World Championships in Bourg St.-Maurice.

Colombe also finished 21st in the K-1 event at the 1972 Summer Olympics in Munich.
