= Mark Fawcett =

Mark Fawcett may refer to:

- Mark Fawcett (canoeist)
- Mark Fawcett (snowboarder)
