= Milan Kalas =

Canoe slalom racer

Medal record

Men's canoe slalom

Representing Czechoslovakia

World Championships
| Gold medal – first place | 1965 Spittal | C-2 team |

Milan Kalas is a former Czechoslovak slalom canoeist who competed in the 1960s. He won a gold medal in the C-2 team event at the 1965 ICF Canoe Slalom World Championships in Spittal.
