= Manfred Hausmann =

Austrian canoeist

Medal record

Men's canoe slalom

Representing Austria

World Championships
Bronze medal – third place	1965 Spittal	K-1 team

Manfred Hausmann is an Austrian retired slalom canoeist who competed in the mid-to-late 1960s. He won a bronze medal in the K-1 team event at the 1965 ICF Canoe Slalom World Championships in Spittal.
