= François Bonnet =

French canoeist

Medal record

Men's canoe slalom

Representing France

World Championships
| Bronze medal – third place | 1969 Bourg St.-Maurice | C-1 team |

François Bonnet (born 11 November 1947) is a French retired slalom canoeist who competed in the 1960s and the 1970s. He won a bronze medal in the C-1 team event at the 1969 ICF Canoe Slalom World Championships in Bourg St.-Maurice. Bonnet also finished 18th in the C-1 event at the 1972 Summer Olympics in Munich.
