= Uli Raysz =

Medal record

Men's slalom canoeing

Representing West Germany

World Championships
Bronze medal – third place	1965 Spittal	K-1

Uli Raysz is a retired West German slalom canoeist who competed in the mid-1960s. He won a bronze medal in the K-1 event at the 1965 ICF Canoe Slalom World Championships in Spittal.
