= Leon Žitnik =

Yugoslav slalom canoeist

Medal record

Men's canoe slalom

Representing Yugoslavia

World Championships
| Silver medal – second place | 1965 Spittal | C-2 team |

Leon Žitnik is a retired Yugoslav slalom canoeist who competed from the late 1950s to the mid-1960s. He won a silver medal in the C-2 team event with his brother Franc at the 1965 ICF Canoe Slalom World Championships in Spittal.
