= Brigitte Schwack =

West German slalom canoeist

Medal record

Women's canoe slalom

Representing West Germany

World Championships
Gold medal – first place	1969 Bourg St.-Maurice	K-1 team

Brigitte Schwack is a former West German slalom canoeist who competed in the 1960s.

She won a gold medal in the K-1 team event at the 1969 ICF Canoe Slalom World Championships in Bourg St.-Maurice.
