= John MacLeod (canoeist) =

British retired slalom canoeist (born 1947)

Medal record

Men's slalom canoeing

Representing Great Britain

World Championships
| Silver medal – second place | 1969 Bourg St.-Maurice | K-1 team |

John Arthur Torquil G. MacLeod (born 31 March 1947) is a British retired slalom canoeist who competed in the 1960s and the 1970s. He won a silver medal in the K-1 team event at the 1969 ICF Canoe Slalom World Championships in Bourg St.-Maurice.

MacLeod finished 30th in the K-1 event at the 1972 Summer Olympics in Munich.

Having coached Junior athletes for two years John very successfully coached senior GB team kayaks from 1979 to 1981 followed by two years as senior GB team chief coach culminating in 7 medals being won by GB Team at the 1983 World Championships. In 1989 John was appointed Manager to the senior team and worked through to the Barcelona Olympic Games and beyond, all voluntary. By 1999 he had left teaching and was appointed as paid full-time Manager to GB teams, later focusing on senior and Olympic teams management. Within his coaching and management years 8 world championship gold medals have been awarded to GB team. In 2009 he was appointed as Canoe Manager for the London 2012 Olympic Games, responsible for both Canoe Sprint and Canoe Slalom, both events being extremely successful. John has been a key player in design and commissioning of both Nottingham (1987) and Lee Valley (2011) canoe slalom courses.
