= Milan Vidmar (canoeist) =

Slovenian canoeist

Medal record

Men's canoe slalom

Representing Yugoslavia

World Championships
Silver medal – second place	1965 Spittal	C-2 team

Milan Vidmar (born 1942) is a Slovenian retired slalom canoeist who competed for Yugoslavia in the 1960s. He won a silver medal in the C-2 team event at the 1965 ICF Canoe Slalom World Championships in Spittal.
