= Heide Boikat =

West German slalom canoeist

Medal record

Women's canoe slalom

Representing West Germany

World Championships
| Bronze medal – third place | 1965 Spittal | K-1 team |

Heide Boikat is a retired slalom canoeist who competed for West Germany in the mid-1960s. She won a bronze medal in the K-1 team event at the 1965 ICF Canoe Slalom World Championships in Spittal.
