= Fernand Götz =

Swiss canoeist

Medal record

Men's canoe slalom

Representing Switzerland

World Championships
Bronze medal – third place	1965 Spittal	C-2

Fernand Götz is a Swiss retired slalom canoeist who competed from the mid-1950s to the late 1960s. He won a bronze medal in the C-2 event at the 1965 ICF Canoe Slalom World Championships in Spittal an der Drau.
