= Horst Dieter Engelke =

West German slalom canoeist

Medal record

Men's canoe slalom

Representing West Germany

World Championships
Gold medal – first place	1965 Spittal	K-1 team

Horst Dieter Engelke is a former West German slalom canoeist who competed in the 1960s. He won a gold medal in the K-1 team event at the 1965 ICF Canoe Slalom World Championships in Spittal.
