= Jaroslav Brejcha =

Medal record

Men's canoe slalom

Representing Czechoslovakia

World Championships
Gold medal – first place	1965 Spittal	C-2 team

Jaroslav Brejcha is a former slalom canoeist who competed for Czechoslovakia in the 1960s. He won a gold medal in the C-2 team event at the 1965 ICF Canoe Slalom World Championships in Spittal.
