= Ulich =

Ulich is a surname. Notable people with the surname include:

- David C. Ulich, American film producer and attorney
- Eleonora Constantia Ulich (fl. 1737), German stage actress and theater actor-manager director
- Ivo Ulich (born 1974), Czech footballer
- Johann Ulich, German organist and composer
- Max Ulich (1896–1964), Generalmajor in the Wehrmacht during World War II

== See also ==
- Uhlich
- Uhlig
