= Kenneth Langford =

British slalom canoeist

Medal record

Men's canoe slalom

Representing Great Britain

World Championships
| Silver medal – second place | 1969 Bourg St.-Maurice | K-1 team |

Kenneth Langford is a British retired slalom canoeist who competed from the mid-1960s to the mid-1970s. He won a silver medal in the K-1 team event at the 1969 ICF Canoe Slalom World Championships in Bourg St.-Maurice.
