= Rolf Müller =

Rolf Müller may refer to:

- Rolf-Dieter Müller (born 1948), German historian
- Rolf Müller (actor) (1904-1988), German actor
- Rolf Müller (molecular biologist) (born 1953), German biochemist
- Rolf Müller (bobsleigh) (born 1961), German bobsledder
- Rolf Müller (canoeist), German slalom canoer
- Rolf Müller (designer) (1940–2015), German graphic designer
