= Christian Kaufmann =

Christian Kaufmann may refer to:

- Christian Kaufmann (bef. 1830 – bef. 1885), Swiss mountain guide from Grindelwald; first ascendant of the Mönch
- Christian Kaufmann (alpine guide) (1872–1939), Swiss mountain guide from Grindelwald active in Canada
- Christian Kaufmann (canoeist) (born c. 1940), West German slalom canoeist
- Christian Kaufmann (skier) (born 1976), Swiss Olympic skier
