= Wolfgang Klingebiel =

Medal record

Men's canoe slalom

Representing Switzerland

World Championships
Bronze medal – third place	1965 Spittal	C-2

Wolfgang Klingebiel is a retired Swiss slalom canoeist who competed in the mid-to-late 1960s. He won a bronze medal in the C-2 event at the 1965 ICF Canoe Slalom World Championships in Spittal.
