= Schmieder =

Schmieder is a surname. Notable people with the surname include:

- Eduard Schmieder (born 1948), German violinist and teacher
- Günther Schmieder (born 1957), German Nordic combined skier
- Heinrich Schmieder (1970-2010), German actor
- Helmut Schmieder, German canoeist
- Oskar Schmieder (1891–1980), the namesake of Schmiederite
- Robert Schmieder (born 1941), American scientist and explorer
- Werner Schmieder (born 1926), German politician
- Wolfgang Schmieder (1901-1990), German musicologist
