= Alain Duvivier =

French canoeist

Medal record

Men's slalom canoeing

Representing France

World Championships
Bronze medal – third place	1969 Bourg St.-Maurice	C-2 team

Alain Duvivier is a French retired slalom canoeist who competed in the late 1960s and the early 1970s. He won a bronze medal in the C-2 team event at the 1969 ICF Canoe Slalom World Championships in Bourg St.-Maurice.
