= Gusenbauer =

Gusenbauer is a surname. Notable people with the surname include:

- Alfred Gusenbauer (born 1960), Austrian politician
- Ilona Gusenbauer (born 1947), Austrian high jumper

== See also ==
- Carl Gussenbauer (1842–1903), Austrian surgeon
