= Zdeněk Sklenář =

Medal record

Men's canoe slalom

Representing Czechoslovakia

World Championships
Silver medal – second place	1969 Bourg St.-Maurice	C-2 team

Zdeněk Sklenář is a retired Czechoslovak slalom canoeist who competed in the late 1960s. He won a silver medal in the C-2 team event at the 1969 ICF Canoe Slalom World Championships in Bourg St.-Maurice.
