= Claude Lutz =

French retired slalom canoeist

Medal record

Men's canoe slalom

Representing France

World Championships
Silver medal – second place	1969 Bourg St.-Maurice	Mixed C-2
Silver medal – second place	1969 Bourg St.-Maurice	Mixed C-2 team
Bronze medal – third place	1967 Lipno	K-1 team

Claude Lutz is a French retired slalom canoeist who competed in the mid-to-late 1960s. With his wife Jarka Lutz (née Jaroslava Krčálová), he won two silver medals at the 1969 ICF Canoe Slalom World Championships in Bourg St.-Maurice (mixed C-2 event and mixed C-2 team event). He also won a bronze medal at the 1967 ICF Canoe Slalom World Championships in Lipno.
