= Michel Berthenet =

Slalom canoeist

Medal record

Men's canoe slalom

Representing France

World Championships
Bronze medal – third place	1965 Spittal	Mixed C-2 team

Michel Berthenet is a French retired slalom canoeist who competed in the mid-1960s. He won a bronze medal in the mixed C-2 team event with Michele Olry at the 1965 ICF Canoe Slalom World Championships in Spittal.
