= Monika Lehmann =

East German slalom canoeist

Medal record

Women's canoe slalom

Representing East Germany

World Championships
Gold medal – first place	1965 Spittal	Mixed C-2 team

Monika Lehmann is a former East German slalom canoeist who competed in the 1960s. She won a gold medal in the mixed C-2 team event at the 1965 ICF Canoe Slalom World Championships in Spittal.
