= Rosner =

Rosner is a surname. Notable people with the surname include:

- Arnold Rosner (1945–2013), American composer
- Eddie Rosner (1910–1976), Polish jazz musician
- Fred Rosner (21st century), American physician
- Heinz Rosner (born 1939), motorcycle road racer
- Henry J. Rosner (1909–1982), American policy researcher
- Mina Rosner (1913–1997), Canadian writer
- Richard G. Rosner
- Rick Rosner (born 1941), American television writer
- Robert Rosner (21st century), American astrophysicist
- Shalom Rosner (21st century), Israeli rabbi
- Shmuel Rosner (21st century), Israeli journalist
- Simon Rösner (21st century), German squash player

== See also ==
- 117439 Rosner, a main-belt asteroid
- Saidye Rosner Bronfman (1897–1995), namesake of the Saidye Bronfman Centre for the Arts
- Rosener
