= Gérard Ghidini =

French canoeist

Medal record

Men's canoe slalom

Representing France

World Championships
| Bronze medal – third place | 1965 Spittal | Mixed C-2 team |

Gérard Ghidini (June 8, 1943 – September 14, 2012) was a French slalom canoeist who competed in the mid-1960s. He won a bronze medal in the mixed C-2 team event at the 1965 ICF Canoe Slalom World Championships in Spittal.
