= Milada Absolonová =

Medal record

Women's canoe slalom

Representing Czechoslovakia

World Championships
Silver medal – second place	1965 Spittal	Mixed C-2 team

Milada Absolonová is a retired slalom canoeist who competed for Czechoslovakia in the mid-to-late 1960s. She won a silver medal in the mixed C-2 team event at the 1965 ICF Canoe Slalom World Championships in Spittal.
