= Erika Schönfeld =

Medal record

Women's canoe slalom

Representing East Germany

World Championships
| Gold medal – first place | 1965 Spittal | Mixed C-2 team |
| Bronze medal – third place | 1965 Spittal | Mixed C-2 |

Erika Schönfeld is a retired East German slalom canoeist who competed in the mid-1960s. She won two medals at the 1965 ICF Canoe Slalom World Championships in Spittal, with a gold in the Mixed C-2 team event and a bronze in the Mixed C-2 event.
