= 1969 ICF Canoe Slalom World Championships =

The 1969 ICF Canoe Slalom World Championships were held in Bourg St.-Maurice, France under the auspices of International Canoe Federation. It was the 11th edition. The mixed C2 team event returned for the third and final time after not being held at the previous championships. East Germany, having one medal at every occasion since 1951, didn't take part because of political reasons.

== Note ==
Only two teams completed the course in the women's K1 team event.

== Medal summary ==
=== Men's ===
==== Canoe ====
Event	Gold	Points	Silver	Points	Bronze	Points
C1	Wolfgang Peters (FRG)	364.32	Reinhold Kauder (FRG)	386.90	Zbyněk Puleč (TCH)	390.61
C1 team	West Germany; Wolfgang Peters; Harald Cuypers; Reinhold Kauder	609.71	Czechoslovakia; František Kadaňka; Zbyněk Puleč; Petr Sodomka	722.32	France; Claude Baux; François Bonnet; Michel Trenchant	793.31
C2	France; Jean-Claude Olry; Jean-Louis Olry	363.53	Czechoslovakia; Zdeněk Měšťan; Ladislav Měšťan	380.73	Czechoslovakia; Zdeněk Valenta; Miroslav Stach	383.72
C2 team	West Germany; Hermann Roock & Norbert Schmidt; Manfred Heß & Wolfgang Wenzel; Karl-Heinz Scheffer & Heinz-Jürgen Steinschulte	604.38	Czechoslovakia; Zdeněk Valenta & Miroslav Stach; Jiří Dejl & Zdeněk Sklenář; Zdeněk Měšťan & Ladislav Měšťan	711.53	France; Jean-Claude Olry & Jean-Louis Olry; Alain Duvivier & Dominique Duvivier; Louis Devilleneuve & Pierre Devilleneuve	755.69

==== Kayak ====
Event	Gold	Points	Silver	Points	Bronze	Points
K1	Claude Peschier (FRA)	272.92	Werner Zimmermann, Jr. (SUI)	284.17	Werner Rosener (FRG)	285.14
K1 team	France; Patrick Maccari; Claude Peschier; Alain Colombe	341.02	United Kingdom; Kenneth Langford; Raymond Calverley; John MacLeod	420.82	West Germany; Ulrich Peters; Jürgen Gerlach; Werner Rosener	466.26

=== Mixed ===
==== Canoe ====
Event	Gold	Points	Silver	Points	Bronze	Points
C2	Czechoslovakia; Milan Svoboda; Jitka Traplová	342.56	France; Jarka Lutz; Claude Lutz	360.57	Czechoslovakia; Jiří Koudela; Hana Křížková	360.70
C2 team	Czechoslovakia; Jiří Koudela & Hana Křížková; Milan Svoboda & Jitka Traplová; Alena Prouzová & Petr Horyna	563.21	France; Jarka Lutz & Claude Lutz; Françoise Labarelle & Ernest Labarelle; Marie-France Curtil & Daniel Curtil	1133.12	United States; Nancy Southworth & Tom Southworth; Gay Fawcett & Mark Fawcett; Louise Wright & Paul Liebman	1345.20

=== Women's ===
==== Kayak ====
Event	Gold	Points	Silver	Points	Bronze	Points
K1	Ludmila Polesná (TCH)	314.18	Ulrike Deppe (FRG)	365.20	Jana Zvěřinová (TCH)	369.45
K1 team	West Germany; Bärbel Körner; Ulrike Deppe; Brigitte Schwack	691.44	Czechoslovakia; Bohumila Kapplová; Jana Zvěřinová; Ludmila Polesná	875.86	–	

== Medals table ==
Rank	Nation	Gold	Silver	Bronze	Total
1	West Germany (FRG)	4	2	2	8
2	Czechoslovakia (TCH)	3	4	4	11
3	France (FRA)	3	2	2	7
4	Great Britain (GBR)	0	1	0	1
4	Switzerland (SUI)	0	1	0	1
6	United States (USA)	0	0	1	1
Totals (6 entries)		10	10	9	29
