= Françoise Labarelle =

French slalom canoeist

Medal record

Women's canoe slalom

Representing France

World Championships
| Silver medal – second place | 1969 Bourg St.-Maurice | Mixed C-2 team |

Françoise Labarelle is a retired French slalom canoeist who competed in the late 1960s. She won a silver medal in the mixed C-2 team event at the 1969 ICF Canoe Slalom World Championships in Bourg St.-Maurice.
