= 1965 ICF Canoe Slalom World Championships =

Canoe slalom event in Spittal an der Drau, Austria

The 1965 ICF Canoe Slalom World Championships were held in Spittal an der Drau, Austria under the auspices of International Canoe Federation for the second time in a row after hosting the event previously in 1963. It was the 9th edition. It also marked some changes in which the folding kayak events were replaced by standard kayaks for the men's and women's events. Additionally, the mixed C2 team event returned for the first time since 1957.

== Medal summary ==
=== Men's ===
==== Canoe ====
Event	Gold	Points	Silver	Points	Bronze	Points
C1	Gert Kleinert (GDR)	335.5	Luděk Beneš (TCH)	374.0	Manfred Schubert (GDR)	383.3
C1 team	Czechoslovakia; Jiří Vočka; Luděk Beneš; Bohuslav Pospíchal	472.8	West Germany; Christian Kaufmann; Heiner Stumpf; Otto Stumpf	517.9	East Germany; Jochen Förster; Gert Kleinert; Manfred Schubert	537.9
C2	East Germany; Günther Merkel; Manfred Merkel	369.7	Czechoslovakia; Jiří Dejl; Zdeněk Fifka	432.3	Switzerland; Fernand Götz; Wolfgang Klingebiel	446.9
C2 team	Czechoslovakia; Ladislav Měšťan & Zdeněk Měšťan; Emil Pollert & Jaroslav Pollert; Jaroslav Brejcha & Milan Kalas	1040.2	Yugoslavia; Janez Andrejašič & Jože Gerkman; Milan Vidmar & Borut Justin; Franc Žitnik & Leon Žitnik	1231.7	West Germany; Friedrich Bohry & Walter Gehlen; Hermann Roock & Norbert Schmidt; Wolf Dieter Seller & Günther Tuchel	1322.7

==== Kayak ====
Event	Gold	Points	Silver	Points	Bronze	Points
K1	Kurt Presslmayr (AUT)	276.7	Eberhard Gläser (GDR)	277.4	Uli Raysz (FRG)	277.7
K1 team	West Germany; Manfred Vogt; Eugen Weimann; Horst Dieter Engelke	493.5	East Germany; Eberhard Gläser; Fritz Lange; Rolf Luber	519.2	Austria; Robert Fabian; Manfred Hausmann; Kurt Presslmayr	565.8

=== Mixed ===
==== Canoe ====
Event	Gold	Points	Silver	Points	Bronze	Points
C2	Czechoslovakia; Ludmilla Sirotková; Václav Janoušek	475.4	Czechoslovakia; Jiřina Šedivcová; Josef Šedivec	494.1	East Germany; Erika Schönfeld; Horst Wängler	532.4
C2 team	East Germany; Edith Grabo & Werner Lempert; Monika Lehmann & Rolf Müller; Erika Schönfeld & Horst Wängler	747.2	Czechoslovakia; Milada Absolonová & Antonín Absolon; Ludmilla Sirotková & Václav Janoušek; Jiřina Šedivcová & Josef Šedivec	843.8	France; Simone Blanc & Gérard Ghidini; Michele Olry & Michel Berthenet; Henriette Guette & Jean Olry	2117.5

=== Women's ===
==== Kayak ====
Event	Gold	Points	Silver	Points	Bronze	Points
K1	Ursula Gläser (GDR)	310.7	Lia Merkel (GDR)	345.5	Bärbel Körner (FRG)	381.3
K1 team	East Germany; Ursula Gläser; Bärbel Richter; Lia Merkel	420.5	Czechoslovakia; Bohumila Kapplová; Renata Knýová; Ludmila Polesná	592.7	West Germany; Heide Boikat; Bärbel Körner; Kirsten Schmidt	722.2

== Medals table ==
Rank	Nation	Gold	Silver	Bronze	Total
1	East Germany (GDR)	5	3	3	11
2	Czechoslovakia (TCH)	3	5	0	8
3	West Germany (FRG)	1	1	4	6
4	Austria (AUT)	1	0	1	2
5	Yugoslavia (YUG)	0	1	0	1
6	France (FRA)	0	0	1	1
6	Switzerland (SUI)	0	0	1	1
Totals (7 entries)		10	10	10	30
