= Simone Blanc =

French canoeist

Medal record

Women's canoe slalom

Representing France

World Championships
Bronze medal – third place	1965 Spittal	Mixed C-2 team

Simone Blanc is a French retired slalom canoeist who competed in the mid-1960s. She won a bronze medal in the mixed C-2 team event at the 1965 ICF Canoe Slalom World Championships in Spittal.
