= German Football Association (GDR) =

Association football governing body of East Germany between 1958 and 1990

German Football Association of the GDR
UEFA
- Short name: DFV
- Founded: 17–18 May 1958; 68 years ago in East Berlin
- Folded: 20 November 1990; 35 years ago
- FIFA affiliation: 1952–1990
- UEFA affiliation: 1954–1990

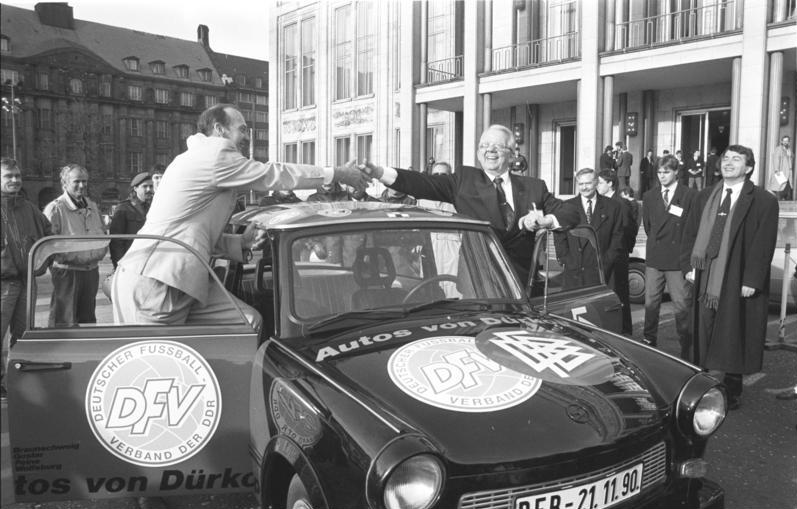
November 1990: Hans-Georg Moldenhauer, president of the NOFV, a subdivision of the DFV, receives a Trabant from DFB president Hermann Neuberger on the occasion of the DFV joining the DFB. The car is adorned with both logos.

The German Football Association of the GDR (German: Deutscher Fußball-Verband der DDR; DFV) was from 1958 the football association of the German Democratic Republic (GDR), fielding the East Germany national football team until 1990 before rejoining its counterpart, the German Football Association (DFB), which had been founded in 1900. The DFV was dissolved on 20 November 1990 in Leipzig and in its place the North East German Football Association was formed and joined the German Football Association on the same day and at the same location, a few weeks after East Germany itself had ceased to exist with the German reunification on 3 October 1990.

== Presidents and General secretaries ==
=== Presidents ===
No.	Name	Period	Notes
1	(East Germany) Fritz Gödicke	1952–1953	
2	(East Germany) Heinz Schöbel	1953–1958	
3	(East Germany) > (East Germany) Kurt Stoph	1958–1961	
4	(East Germany) Helmut Riedel	1961–1976	
5	(East Germany) Günter Schneider	1976–1983	
6	(East Germany) Günter Erbach	1983–1990	
7	(East Germany) Hans-Georg Moldenhauer	1990	

=== General Secretaries ===
No.	Name	Period	Notes
1	(East Germany) Erich Jahnsmüller	1952–1957	
2	(East Germany) > (East Germany) Josef Kamm	1957–1961	
3	(East Germany) Kurt Michalski	1961–1968	
4	(East Germany) Günter Schneider	1968–1973	
5	(East Germany) Werner Lempert	1974–1983	
6	(East Germany) Karl Zimmermann	1983–1987	
7	(East Germany) Wolfgang Spitzner	1988–1990	
8	(East Germany) Klaus Petersdorf	1990	

== See also ==
- Football in East Germany
