= Christian Kaufmann (canoeist) =

German canoeist

Medal record

Men's canoe slalom

Representing West Germany

World Championships
| Silver medal – second place | 1965 Spittal | C-1 team |

Christian Kaufmann is a retired slalom canoeist who competed for West Germany in the mid-1960s. He won a silver medal in the C-1 team event at the 1965 ICF Canoe Slalom World Championships in Spittal.
