= Paul Liebman =

American canoeist

Medal record

Men's canoe slalom

Representing United States

World Championships
Bronze medal – third place	1969 Bourg St.-Maurice	Mixed C-2 team

Paul Liebman is a retired American slalom canoeist who competed in the late 1960s. He won a bronze medal in the mixed C-2 team event at the 1969 ICF Canoe Slalom World Championships in Bourg St.-Maurice. He served as the commodore of the Philadelphia Canoe Club from 1969 to 1972. Paul & Louise Wright also won the C-2 Mixed Wildwater National Championship title in 1969.

In 1973, Paul and Leena Mela placed 2nd in C2 Mixed World Championships in Muotathal, Switzerland and 3rd in 1975 C2 Mixed World Championships in Skopje (YUG)
