= Zbyněk Pulec =

Czechoslovak retired slalom canoeist (born 1948)

Medal record

Men's canoe slalom

Representing Czechoslovakia

World Championships
Silver medal – second place	1969 Bourg St.-Maurice	C-1 team
Bronze medal – third place	1969 Bourg St.-Maurice	C-1
Bronze medal – third place	1971 Meran	C-1 team

Zbyněk Pulec (born 5 February 1948) is a Czechoslovak retired slalom canoeist who competed in the late 1960s and the early 1970s. He won three medals at the ICF Canoe Slalom World Championships, with a silver (C-1 team: 1969) and two bronzes (C-1: 1969, C-1 team: 1971).

Pulec also finished ninth in the C-1 event at the 1972 Summer Olympics in Munich.
