= Ernest Labarelle =

French slalom canoeist

Medal record
Ernest Labarelle
Medal record
Men's canoe slalom
Representing France
World Championships
Silver medal – second place	1969 Bourg St.-Maurice	Mixed C-2 team

Ernest Labarelle is a retired French slalom canoeist who competed from the early 1960s to the early 1970s. He won a silver medal in the mixed C-2 team event at the 1969 ICF Canoe Slalom World Championships in Bourg St.-Maurice.
