= Werner Rosener =

Medal record

Men's slalom canoeing

Representing West Germany

World Championships
Bronze medal – third place	1969 Bourg St.-Maurice	K-1
Bronze medal – third place	1969 Bourg St.-Maurice	K-1 team

Werner Rosener is a West German retired slalom canoeist who competed in the late 1960s and the early 1970s. He won two bronze medals at the 1969 ICF Canoe Slalom World Championships in Bourg St.-Maurice, earning them in the K-1 and K-1 team events.
