= Václav Janoušek =

Medal record

Men's canoe slalom

Representing Czechoslovakia

World Championships
Gold medal – first place	1965 Spittal	Mixed C2
Silver medal – second place	1965 Spittal	Mixed C2 team

Gabriel Janoušek is a Czechoslovak retired slalom canoeist who competed in the 1960s. He won two medals at the 1965 ICF Canoe Slalom World Championships in Spittal with a gold in the Mixed C2 event and a silver in the Mixed C2 team event.
