= Jože Gerkman =

Yugoslav slalom canoeist

Medal record

Men's canoe slalom

Representing Yugoslavia

World Championships
| Silver medal – second place | 1965 Spittal | C-2 team |

Jože Gerkman is a retired slalom canoeist who competed for Yugoslavia from the mid-to-late 1960s. He won a silver medal in the C-2 team event at the 1965 ICF Canoe Slalom World Championships in Spittal.
