= Jean-Claude Olry =

French retired slalom canoeist (born 1949)

Medal record

Men's canoe slalom

Representing France

Olympic Games
Bronze medal – third place	1972 Munich	C-2

World Championships
Gold medal – first place	1969 Bourg St.-Maurice	C-2
Bronze medal – third place	1969 Bourg St.-Maurice	C-2 team

Jean-Claude Patrice Jacques Bernard Olry (born 28 December 1949 in Boves, Somme) is a French retired slalom canoeist who competed in the late 1960s and early 1970s. He won a bronze in the C-2 event at the 1972 Summer Olympics in Munich.

Olry also won two medals at the 1969 ICF Canoe Slalom World Championships in Bourg St.-Maurice with a gold in the C-2 event and a bronze in the C-2 team event.

He won all his medals while partnering his brother Jean-Louis.
