= Porcia, Friuli-Venezia Giulia =

Porcia
- Comune
- Città di Porcia
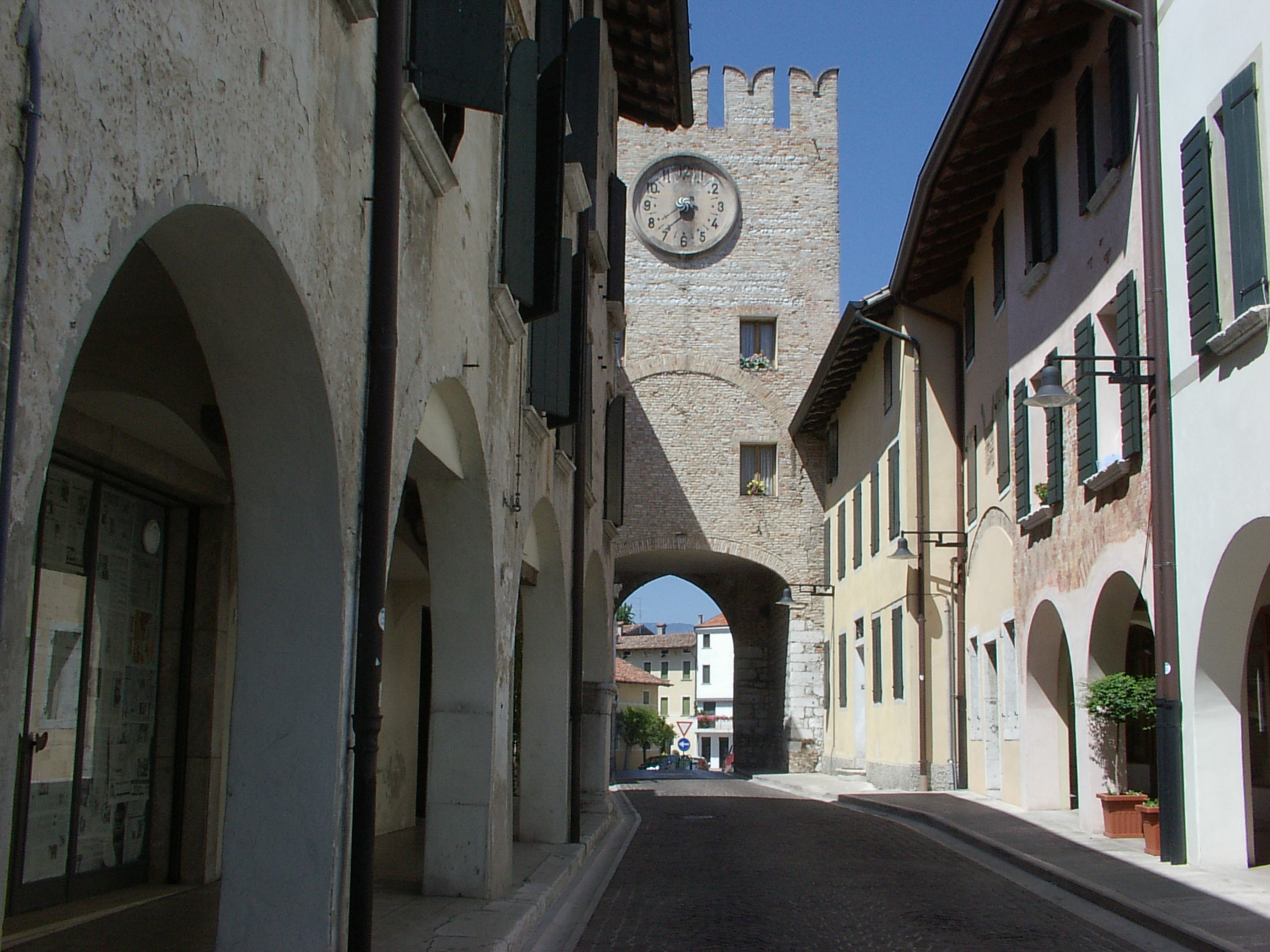
- Clock tower in Porcia

- Coat of arms

- Location within Italy Location within Friuli-Venezia Giulia
- Coordinates: 45°58′N 12°37′E
- Country: Italy
- Region: Friuli-Venezia Giulia
- Province: Pordenone (PN)
- Frazioni: Palse, Pieve, Rondover, Rorai Piccolo, Sant'Antonio, Spinazzedo, Talponedo

Government
  - Mayor: Marco Sartini

Area
  - Total: 29.5 km^{2} (11.4 sq mi)
- Elevation: 29 m (95 ft)

Population (30 April 2008)
  - Total: 15,142
  - Density: 513/km^{2} (1,330/sq mi)
- Demonym: Purliliesi
- Time zone: UTC+1 (CET)
  - Summer (DST): UTC+2 (CEST)
- Postal code: 33080
- Dialing code: 0434
- Patron saint: St. George
- Saint day: April 23
- Website: Official website

Porcia (pronounced [porˈtʃiːa]) is a comune (municipality) in the Regional decentralization entity of Pordenone, in the Italian region of Friuli-Venezia Giulia, located about 100 kilometres (62 mi) northwest of Trieste and about 3 kilometres (1.9 mi) west of Pordenone.

== Main sights ==
- The castle, residence from the 12th century of the Porcia family (Counts, later Princes)
- Torre dell'Orologio ("Watch Tower")
- Villa Correr-Dolfin (late 17th – early 18th centuries)
- Church of St. George, known from 1262. It has a 44-metre (144 ft) standing unfinished bell tower.

== Twin towns ==
Porcia is twinned with:

- Spittal an der Drau, Austria
- Berettyóújfalu, Hungary
