= Louis Devilleneuve =

French canoeist

Medal record

Men's slalom canoeing

Representing France

World Championships
Bronze medal – third place	1969 Bourg St.-Maurice	C-2 team

Louis Devilleneuve is a retired French slalom canoeist who competed from the late 1960s to the mid-1970s. He won a bronze medal in the C-2 team event at the 1969 ICF Canoe Slalom World Championships in Bourg St.-Maurice.
