= Petr Horyna =

Czechoslovak slalom canoeist

Medal record

Men's canoe slalom

Representing Czechoslovakia

World Championships
Gold medal – first place	1969 Bourg St.-Maurice	Mixed C-2 team

Petr Horyna is a former Czechoslovak slalom canoeist who competed in the 1960s.

He won a gold medal in the mixed C-2 team event at the 1969 ICF Canoe Slalom World Championships in Bourg St.-Maurice.
