= Jarka Lutz =

Medal record

Women's canoe slalom

World Championships

Representing Czechoslovakia
Gold medal – first place	1967 Lipno	Mixed C-2

Representing France
Silver medal – second place	1969 Bourg St.-Maurice	Mixed C-2
Silver medal – second place	1969 Bourg St.-Maurice	Mixed C-2 team

Jaroslava "Jarka" Lutz (née Krčálová) is a Czechoslovak-French slalom canoeist who competed in the late 1960s. She won a gold medal in the mixed C-2 event at the 1967 ICF Canoe Slalom World Championships in Lipno nad Vltavou, representing Czechoslovakia. She married French slalom canoeist Claude Lutz in December 1967 and continued competing with him in C-2 Mixed (male/female double canoe). Together they won two silver medals at the 1969 ICF Canoe Slalom World Championships in Bourg St.-Maurice (one individual and one in the team event).
