= Michel Trenchant =

French retired slalom canoeist (born 1945)

Medal record

Men's canoe slalom

Representing France

World Championships
Bronze medal – third place	1969 Bourg St.-Maurice	C-1 team

Michel Trenchant (born 1 February 1945) is a French retired slalom canoeist who competed in the 1960s and 1970s. He won a bronze medal in the C-1 team event at the 1969 ICF Canoe Slalom World Championships in Bourg St.-Maurice. Trenchant also finished 12th in the C-1 event at the 1972 Summer Olympics in Munich.
