= Jitka Legatová =

Czech slalom canoeist

Medal record

Women's canoe slalom

Representing Czechoslovakia

World Championships
Gold medal – first place	1969 Bourg-Saint-Maurice	Mixed C-2
Gold medal – first place	1969 Bourg-Saint-Maurice	Mixed C-2 team
Silver medal – second place	1971 Meran	Mixed C-2

Jitka Legatová (née Traplová; born 11 March 1944) is a Czech retired slalom canoeist who competed for Czechoslovakia in the 1960s and 1970s.

== Life ==
Legatová was born on 11 March 1944. She lives in Chomutov. She is a daughter of Jindřich Trapl, a canoeist who founded the club SC Vodní stavby Chomutov. She married the canoeist Viktor Legat. She is a co-founder and member of the SC80 Chomutov canoeing club, for which she was awarded the Ústí nad Labem Region Governor's Award in 2024.

== Career ==
She won gold medals in the mixed C-2 event and the mixed C-2 team event at the 1969 ICF Canoe Slalom World Championships in Bourg-Saint-Maurice. She won a silver medal in the mixed C-2 event at the 1971 ICF Canoe Slalom World Championships in Meran.
