= Kurt Presslmayr =

Austrian slalom canoeist (1943–2025)

Personal information
- Born: 6 February 1943 Steyr, Austria
- Died: 28 November 2025 (aged 82)
- Height: 172 cm (5 ft 8 in)
- Weight: 70 kg (154 lb)
Medal record
Men's slalom canoeing
Representing Austria
World Championships
Gold medal – first place	1965 Spittal	K-1
Gold medal – first place	1971 Meran	K-1 team
Bronze medal – third place	1965 Spittal	K-1 team

Kurt Presslmayr (6 February 1943 – 28 November 2025) was an Austrian slalom canoeist who competed from the mid-1960s to the early 1970s. He won three medals at the ICF Canoe Slalom World Championships, with two golds (K-1: 1965, K-1 team: 1971) and a bronze (K-1 team: 1965). Presslmayr also finished tenth in the K-1 event at the 1972 Summer Olympics in Munich. He was named Austrian Sportsman of the Year in 1965. He was born in Steyr and died on 28 November 2025, aged 82.
