= Jiřina Valenta =

Personal information
- Born: Jiřina Bořilova; October 31, 1940 (age 85) Prague, Protectorate of Bohemia and Moravia
- Occupations: Whitewater Canoeist; Foreign Trade Buyer; Respiratory Therapist; Real Estate Agent; Medical Office Manager
- Spouses: Josef Šedivec (m. 1963; div. 1973); Lubomir Jan-Vaclav Valenta (m. 1979; died 2012)
Medal record
C2 Mixed Slalom & Wildwater
Representing Czechoslovakia
Wildwater World Championships
Silver medal – second place	1965 Spittal	C2 Mixed Downriver
Gold medal – first place	1965 Spittal	C2 Mixed Team Downriver
Slalom World Championships
Silver medal – second place	1965 Spittal	C2 Mixed Slalom
Silver medal – second place	1965 Spittal	C2 Mixed Team Slalom

Jiřina Valenta (born Jiřina Bořilova; October 31, 1940) is a retired Czechoslovak-American wildwater and slalom canoeist who competed from the early 1960s to the early 1970s with then-husband Josef Šedivec under the last name Šedivcová. She won two silver medals at the 1965 ICF Canoe Slalom World Championships in Spittal, earning them in the C2 Mixed and C2 Mixed Team events. She also won a silver medal in the individual C2 Mixed Whitewater Downriver (Classic Race) event and a gold medal in the C2 Mixed Team Whitewater Downriver (Classic Race) event at the 1965 ICF Wildwater Canoeing World Championships, likewise held in Spittal.

Jiřina's career began in then Czechoslovakia and ended in the United States. She is credited with being the first woman to steer a whitewater canoe in slalom competitions as part of a two-person, mixed-gender team. Until that time, conventional wisdom held that women, by nature of their gender, were somehow likely incapable of directing a boat through a course of gates set up over river rapids.

== Early life ==
Jiřina was the eldest of three children born into a modest household. Extremely active in sports, she participated in track and field, gymnastics, and competitive swimming, particularly breaststroke. She also sang first string for her elementary school choir and excelled at her studies, including physics. Watercolor painting was a beloved hobby.

An engineer, her father suffered injuries to his hands that rendered him incapable of carrying on his profession. Her mother, a small business owner, was labeled a "capitalist" and forcibly placed in a factory by the occupying Soviets a few years after the conclusion of WWII. The private store she ran was confiscated by the communist political presence during the 1948 nationalization of private enterprises.

During her childhood, she cared for her family and the home. From the age of 8, Jiřina's household duties consisted of preparing meals, doing laundry, making beds, scrubbing floors, washing dishes, and cleaning windows. The family often struggled to feed itself and Jiřina and her two younger brothers, Otto and Mirek, frequently attended school without packed lunches.

As a teenager, Jiřina studied foreign relations in a secondary education program which would prepare her for work placement later on. Otherwise, chaperoned by her mother, she attended dance classes and events, such as debutante balls, beginning at age 16. They occupied much of her free time.

== Employment & higher education years ==
Any Czechoslovak citizen who had completed secondary education was assigned a national employer for a period of 2–3 years. The import/export company Artia received Jiřina in 1958. Shortly thereafter, she began university correspondence courses in economics.

On NYE 1961, she met her soon-to-be first husband, Josef Šedivec, on a ski slope.

== Early training & competitions ==
Josef invited Jiřina to begin training with him and eventually they formed a C2 mixed team for a club in Prague. He had lost his former steering partner over personality conflicts.

In the spring of 1962, they began competing. During the period from 1962-1964, they continued winning domestic downriver and slalom events.

On November 23, 1963, the two married and began racing under the names Šedivcová-Šedivec. Their grueling practices of five hours in total split between mornings and afternoons six days a week, regardless of the season, included time in the waters of the Vltava, even in the dead of winter with the river partially frozen over.

== Later competitions ==
They first journeyed to Austria to do some sightseeing and run several of the country's rivers in 1964. As unknowns, they participated in an international slalom race on the Drava River outside of Spittal while there.

With the international whitewater community looking on, Jiřina and Josef defeated the standing C2 mixed world champions from East Germany. Their surprise victory resonated throughout the racing community and tales of the upset appeared in local sports magazines.

Upon their return home, they were made members of the Czechoslovak national whitewater team.

They represented then Czechoslovakia at the 1965 ICF world championship in Spittal and won silver in the individual C2 Mixed Slalom, silver in the team C2 Mixed Slalom, silver in the individual C2 Mixed Whitewater Downriver (Classic Race), and gold in the team C2 Mixed Whitewater Downriver (Classic Race) competitions.

Jiřina and Josef continued to dominate the Czechoslovak national race circuit until they left the country in 1968, frequently placing first.

== Emigration & first years in the United States ==
In August 1968, Jiřina and Josef left Czechoslovakia given the intensification of the Russian occupation. After spending several months in Eindhoven, Netherlands, they emigrated to California, United States, via Brussels, Belgium, in March 1969.

== Later years ==
...
