= Marietta Gillman =

American canoeist

Medal record

Women's canoe slalom

Representing United States

World Championships
Gold medal – first place	1975 Skopje	Mixed C-2
Gold medal – first place	1977 Spittal	Mixed C-2

Marietta Gillman is a former American slalom canoeist who competed in the mid-to-late 1970s. She won two gold medals in the mixed C-2 event at the ICF Canoe Slalom World Championships, earning them in 1975 and 1977.
