= Marie-France Curtil =

French slalom canoeist

Medal record

Women's canoe slalom

Representing France

World Championships
Silver medal – second place	1969 Bourg St.-Maurice	Mixed C-2 team

Marie-France Curtil is a French retired slalom canoeist who competed in the late 1960s. She won a silver medal in the mixed C-2 team event at the 1969 ICF Canoe Slalom World Championships in Bourg St.-Maurice.
