= Rolf Müller (canoeist) =

East German canoeist

Medal record

Men's canoe slalom

Representing East Germany

World Championships
Gold medal – first place	1965 Spittal	Mixed C-2 team

Rolf Müller is a former East German slalom canoeist who competed in the 1960s. He won a gold medal in the mixed C-2 team event at the 1965 ICF Canoe Slalom World Championships in Spittal.
