= Horst Wängler =

Medal record

Men's canoe slalom

Representing East Germany

World Championships
| Gold medal – first place | 1961 Hainsberg | Folding K-1 team |
| Gold medal – first place | 1965 Spittal | Mixed C-2 team |
| Silver medal – second place | 1967 Lipno | Mixed C-2 |
| Bronze medal – third place | 1965 Spittal | Mixed C-2 |

Horst Wängler is an East German retired slalom canoeist who competed in the 1960s. He won four medals at the ICF Canoe Slalom World Championships with two golds (Folding K-1 team: 1961, Mixed C-2 team: 1965), a silver (Mixed C-2: 1967) and a bronze (Mixed C-2: 1965).
