= Siegfried Seidemann =

Medal record

Men's canoe slalom

Representing East Germany

World Championships
Silver medal – second place	1957 Augsburg	Mixed C-2
Bronze medal – third place	1959 Geneva	Mixed C-2

Siegfried Seidemann is a retired East German slalom canoeist who competed in the late 1950s. He won two medals in the mixed C-2 event at the ICF Canoe Slalom World Championships with a silver in 1957 and a bronze in 1959.
