= Milan Svoboda =

Medal record

Men's canoe slalom

Representing Czechoslovakia

World Championships
Gold medal – first place	1967 Lipno	Mixed C-2
Gold medal – first place	1969 Bourg St.-Maurice	Mixed C-2
Gold medal – first place	1969 Bourg St.-Maurice	Mixed C-2 team
Silver medal – second place	1971 Meran	Mixed C-2

Milan Svoboda (22 August 1939 – 22 July 2004 in Prague) was a Czechoslovak slalom canoeist who competed in the late 1960s and the early 1970s. He won four medals at the ICF Canoe Slalom World Championships with three golds (Mixed C-2: 1967, 1969; Mixed C-2 team: 1969) and a silver (Mixed C-2: 1971).
