= Jean Olry =

Medal record

Men's canoe slalom

Representing France

World Championships
Silver medal – second place	1957 Augsburg	Mixed C-2 team
Bronze medal – third place	1965 Spittal	Mixed C-2 team

Jean Olry is a French retired slalom canoeist who competed from the late 1950s to the mid-1960s. He won two medals in the mixed C-2 team event at the ICF Canoe Slalom World Championships with a silver in 1957 and a bronze in 1965.
