= Brigitte Schmidt =

East German canoeist

Medal record

Women's canoe slalom

Representing East Germany

World Championships
Gold medal – first place	1957 Augsburg	Mixed C-2
Gold medal – first place	1957 Augsburg	Mixed C-2 team

Brigitte Schmidt is a retired East German slalom canoeist who competed in the mid-to-late 1950s. She won two gold medals at the 1957 ICF Canoe Slalom World Championships in Augsburg, earning them in the mixed C-2 event and the mixed C-2 team event.
