= Simone Gavinet =

French canoeist

Medal record

Women's canoe slalom

Representing France

World Championships
Silver medal – second place	1955 Tacen	Mixed C-2

Simone Gavinet is a French retired slalom canoeist who competed in the mid-1950s. She won a silver medal in the mixed C-2 event at the 1955 ICF Canoe Slalom World Championships in Tacen.
