= Werner Lempert =

East German canoeist

Medal record

Men's canoe slalom

Representing East Germany

World Championships
Gold medal – first place	1965 Spittal	Mixed C-2 team
Silver medal – second place	1963 Spittal	Mixed C-2

Werner Lempert is a retired East German slalom canoeist who competed in the 1960s. He won two medals at the ICF Canoe Slalom World Championships with a gold in 1965 (Mixed C-2 team) and a silver in 1963 (Mixed C-2). Lempert also served as the general secretary of the German Football Association of the GDR (DFV) between 1974 and 1983.
