= Uhlig =

The surname Uhlig may refer to the following people:

- Alexander Uhlig (1919–2008), German soldier
- Erika Uhlig, German slalom canoeist
- Florian Uhlig (born 1974), German pianist
- Frank Uhlig (born 1955), German footballer
- Herbert H. Uhlig (1907–1993), American physical chemist, famous for studying corrosion
- Katrin Uhlig (born 1982), German politician
- Max Uhlig (born 1937), German painter
- Oskar Uhlig, German figure skater
- Petra Uhlig (born 1954), German handball player
- Theodor Uhlig (1822–1853), German musician, writer, and friend of Richard Wagner
