= Jean Trenchant =

French 15th century mathematician

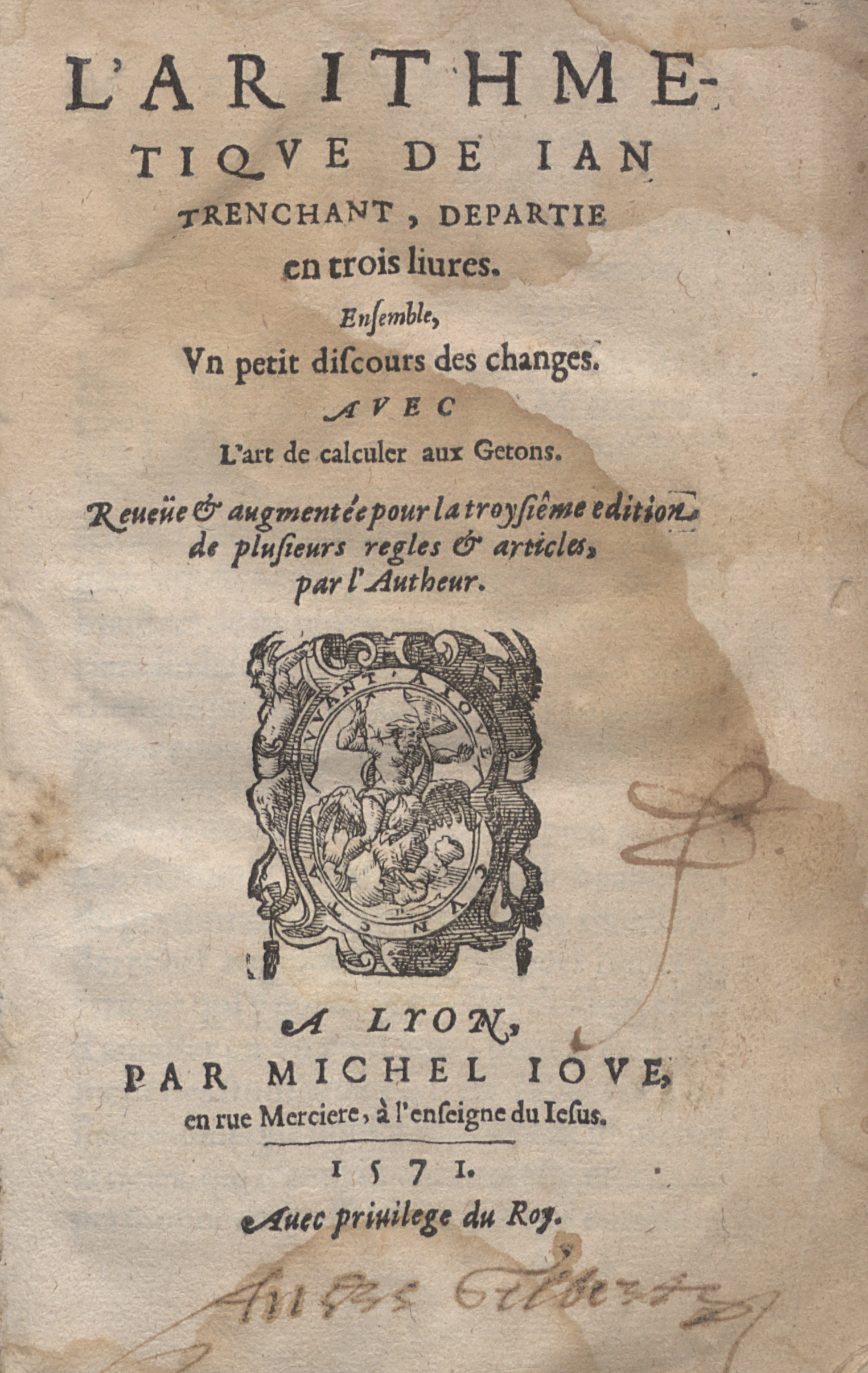
Arithmetique, 1571

Jean Trenchant (... – 15th-century) was a French mathematician

L'aritmetique departie en trois livres was used as a reference by Simon Stevin in the preface of Tafelen van Interest.

== Works ==
- Trenchant, Jean (1561). L'aritmetique de Jan Trenchant departie en trois livres, ensemble un petit discours des changes. Avec l'art de calculet aux Getons (in French). Lyon: Jove.
- Trenchant, Jean (1571). Arithmetique (in French). A Lyon: Michel Jouve, Pierre Roussin.
