= Jean-Louis Olry =

French retired slalom canoeist (born 1946)

Medal record

Men's canoe slalom

Representing France

Olympic Games
Bronze medal – third place	1972 Munich	C-2

World Championships
Gold medal – first place	1969 Bourg St.-Maurice	C-2
Bronze medal – third place	1967 Lipno	K-1 team
Bronze medal – third place	1969 Bourg St.-Maurice	C-2 team

Jean-Louis René Olry (born 6 August 1946 in Montrouge) is a French retired slalom canoeist who competed from the mid-1960s to the early 1970s. He won a bronze medal in the C-2 event at the 1972 Summer Olympics in Munich.

Olry also won three medals at the ICF Canoe Slalom World Championships with one gold (C-2: 1969) and two bronzes (K-1 team: 1967, C-2 team: 1969).

He partner in the C-2 boat was his brother Jean-Claude.
