= Ludmilla Sirotková =

Medal record

Women's canoe slalom

Representing Czechoslovakia

World Championships
Gold medal – first place	1965 Spittal	Mixed C-2
Silver medal – second place	1965 Spittal	Mixed C-2 team
Bronze medal – third place	1971 Meran	Mixed C-2

Ludmilla Sirotková is a Czechoslovak retired slalom canoeist who competed from the mid-1960s to the early 1970s. She won three medals at the ICF Canoe Slalom World Championships with a gold (Mixed C-2: 1965) and two bronzes (Mixed C-2: 1971, Mixed C-2 team: 1965).
