= Waltraud Schale =

Medal record

Women's canoe slalom

Representing East Germany

World Championships
| Gold medal – first place | 1957 Augsburg | Mixed C-2 team |
| Bronze medal – third place | 1957 Augsburg | Mixed C-2 |

Waltraud Schale is a retired East German slalom canoeist who competed in the late 1950s. She won two medals at the 1957 ICF Canoe Slalom World Championships in Augsburg with a gold in the mixed C-2 team event and a bronze in the mixed C-2 event.
