= Rudolf Seifert =

East German slalom canoeist

Medal record

Men's canoe slalom

Representing East Germany

World Championships
Gold medal – first place	1957 Augsburg	Mixed C-2 team
Gold medal – first place	1959 Geneva	C-2 team
Gold medal – first place	1963 Spittal	C-2 team
Bronze medal – third place	1957 Augsburg	Mixed C-2

Rudolf Seifert is a retired East German slalom canoeist who competed in the 1950s and the 1960s. He won four medals at the ICF Canoe Slalom World Championships with three golds (C-2 team: 1959, 1963; Mixed C-2 team: 1957) and a bronze (Mixed C-2: 1957).
