= Margitta Troger =

Medal record

Women's canoe slalom

Representing East Germany

World Championships
Silver medal – second place	1959 Geneva	Mixed C-2

Margitta Troger is a retired East German slalom canoeist who competed in the late 1950s. She won a silver medal in the mixed C-2 event at the 1959 ICF Canoe Slalom World Championships in Geneva.
