= Mark Fawcett (canoeist) =

American slalom canoeist

Medal record

Men's canoe slalom

Representing United States

World Championships
Bronze medal – third place	1969 Bourg St.-Maurice	Mixed C-2 team

Mark Fawcett is an American retired slalom canoeist who competed in the mid-to-late 1960s. He won a bronze medal in the mixed C-2 team event at the 1969 ICF Canoe Slalom World Championships in Bourg St.-Maurice.
