= Edith Grabo =

East German slalom canoeist

Medal record

Women's canoe slalom

Representing East Germany

World Championships
Gold medal – first place	1965 Spittal	Mixed C-2 team
Bronze medal – third place	1967 Lipno	Mixed C-2

Edith Grabo is a retired slalom canoeist who competed for East Germany in the 1960s. She won two medals at the ICF Canoe Slalom World Championships, with a gold in 1965 (Mixed C-2 team) and a bronze in 1967 (Mixed C-2).
