= Tom Southworth =

American canoeist

Medal record

Men's canoe slalom

Representing United States

World Championships
Bronze medal – third place	1969 Bourg St.-Maurice	Mixed C-2 team

Thomas Roy Southworth (April 12, 1944 – February 16, 2019) was an American slalom canoeist who competed in the 1960s and 1970s. He won a bronze medal in the mixed C-2 team event at the 1969 ICF Canoe Slalom World Championships in Bourg St.-Maurice. Southworth also finished 12th in the C-2 event at the 1972 Summer Olympics in Munich. He was born in Washington, D.C..
