= Nancy Southworth =

American canoeist

Medal record

Women's canoe slalom

Representing United States

World Championships
Bronze medal – third place	1969 Bourg St.-Maurice	Mixed C-2 team

Nancy Southworth is a retired American slalom canoeist who competed in the late 1960s and the early 1970s. She won a bronze medal in the mixed C-2 team event at the 1969 ICF Canoe Slalom World Championships in Bourg St.-Maurice.
