= Jiří Koudela =

Czechoslovak retired slalom canoeist

Medal record

Men's canoe slalom

Representing Czechoslovakia

World Championships
Gold medal – first place	1969 Bourg St.-Maurice	Mixed C-2 team
Gold medal – first place	1971 Meran	Mixed C-2
Bronze medal – third place	1969 Bourg St.-Maurice	Mixed C-2

Jiří Koudela is a Czechoslovak retired slalom canoeist who competed in the late 1960s and early 1970s. He won three medals at the ICF Canoe Slalom World Championships with two golds (Mixed C-2: 1971; Mixed C-2 team: 1969) and a bronze (Mixed C-2: 1969).
