= Franc Žitnik =

Yugoslav slalom canoeist

Medal record

Men's canoe slalom

Representing Yugoslavia

World Championships
Silver medal – second place	1965 Spittal	C-2 team

Franc Žitnik (born 8 March 1941) is a Yugoslav retired slalom canoeist who competed from the late 1950s to the mid-1970s. He won a silver medal in the C-2 team event at the 1965 ICF Canoe Slalom World Championships in Spittal. Žitnik also finished 19th in the C-2 event at the 1972 Summer Olympics in Munich.

His son Boštjan represented Slovenia at the 1992 Summer Olympics where he finished 10th in the C-1 event.
