= Vratislava Nováková =

Medal record

Women's canoe slalom

Representing Czechoslovakia

World Championships
Gold medal – first place	1961 Hainsberg	Mixed C-2
Bronze medal – third place	1963 Spittal	Mixed C-2

Vratislava Nováková is a retired Czechoslovak slalom canoeist who competed in the early-to-mid 1960s. She won two medals in the mixed C-2 event at the ICF Canoe Slalom World Championships with a gold in 1961 and a bronze in 1963.
