= Manfred Glöckner =

East German canoeist

Medal record

Men's canoe slalom

Representing East Germany

World Championships
Gold medal – first place	1957 Augsburg	Mixed C-2
Gold medal – first place	1957 Augsburg	Mixed C-2 team
Gold medal – first place	1959 Geneva	C-2 team
Gold medal – first place	1963 Spittal	C-2 team

Manfred Glöckner (18 January 1936 – 8 October 2005) was an East German slalom canoeist who competed in the 1950s and the 1960s. He won four gold medals at the ICF Canoe Slalom World Championships (Mixed C-2: 1957; C-2 team: 1959, 1963; Mixed C-2 team: 1957).

On 14 July 1990, Glöckner was elected President of the newly founded Landes-Kanu-Verbandes Brandenburg (State Canoe Association of Brandenburg), a position he held until 2005. In March 2005, Glöckner was appointed honorary president and died seven months later at the age of 69.
