= Jarmila Pacherová =

Czechoslovak slalom canoeist

Medal record

Women's canoe slalom

Representing Czechoslovakia

World Championships
Bronze medal – third place	1955 Tacen	Mixed C-2
Bronze medal – third place	1961 Hainsberg	Mixed C-2

Jarmila Pacherová is a retired Czechoslovak slalom canoeist who competed from the early 1950s to the early 1960s. She won two bronze medals in the mixed C-2 event at the ICF Canoe Slalom World Championships, earning them in 1955 and 1961.
