= Josef Šedivec =

Czechoslovak-American wildwater and slalom canoeist

Medal record

Men's canoe slalom

Representing Czechoslovakia

World Championships
Silver medal – second place	1965 Spittal	Mixed C-2
Silver medal – second place	1965 Spittal	Mixed C-2 team

Josef Šedivec is a retired Czechoslovak-American wildwater and slalom canoeist who competed from the mid-1960s to the early 1970s. He won two silver medals at the 1965 ICF Canoe Slalom World Championships in Spittal, earning them in the mixed C-2 event and the mixed C-2 team event. He also won a silver medal in the individual C-2 Downriver event and a gold medal in the C-2 team mixed Downriver event at the 1965 Wildwater Canoeing World Championships also in Spittal.
