= Erika Uhlig =

East German slalom canoeist

Medal record

Women's canoe slalom

Representing East Germany

World Championships
Silver medal – second place	1967 Lipno	Mixed C-2

Erika Uhlig is a retired East German slalom canoeist who competed in the late 1960s. She won a silver medal in the mixed C-2 event at the 1967 ICF Canoe Slalom World Championships in Lipno nad Vltavou.
