= Helmut Schmieder =

East German canoeist

Medal record

Men's canoe slalom

Representing East Germany

World Championships
| Gold medal – first place | 1957 Augsburg | Mixed C-2 team |

Helmut Schmieder is a former East German slalom canoeist who competed in the 1950s. He won a gold medal in the mixed C-2 team event at the 1957 ICF Canoe Slalom World Championships in Augsburg.
