= Carl Gussenbauer =

Austrian surgeon (1842–1903)

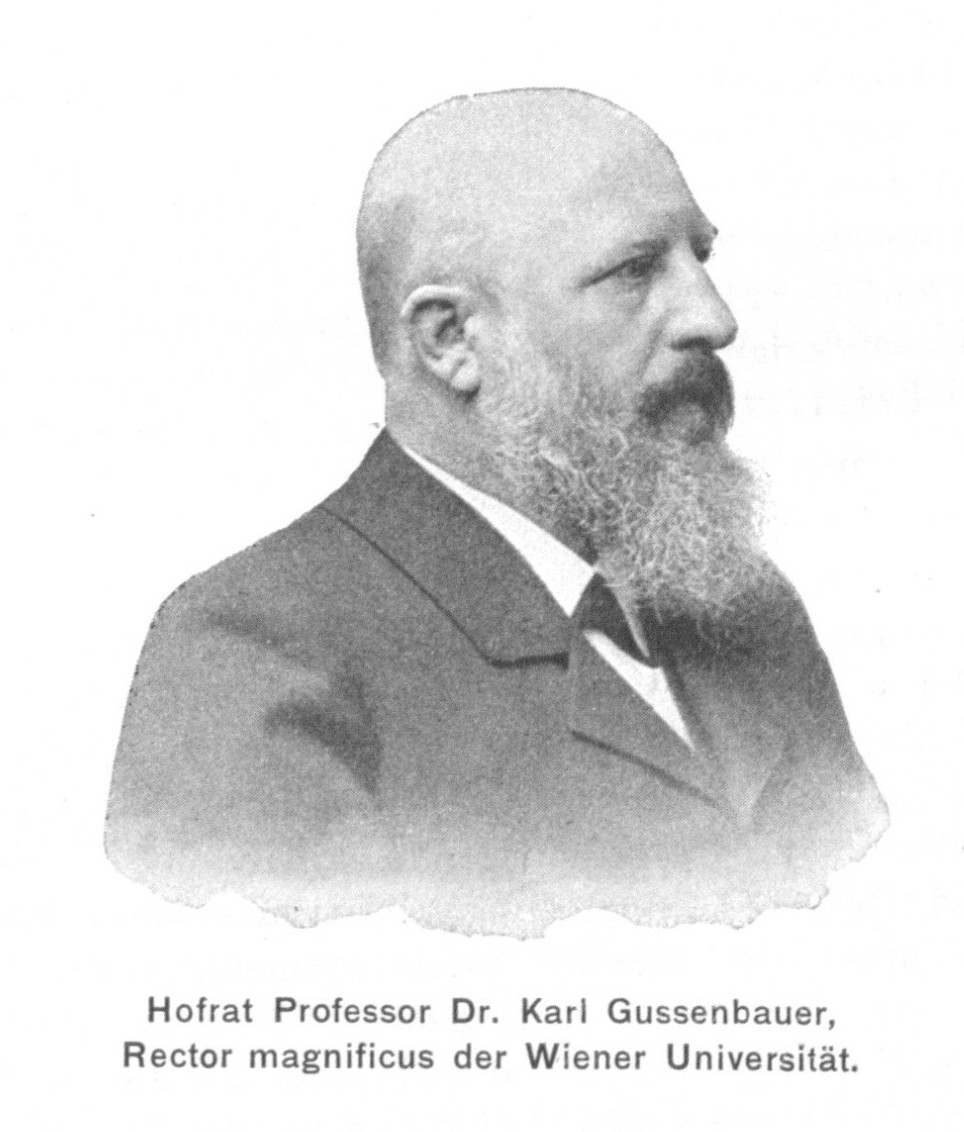
Carl Gussenbauer in 1902

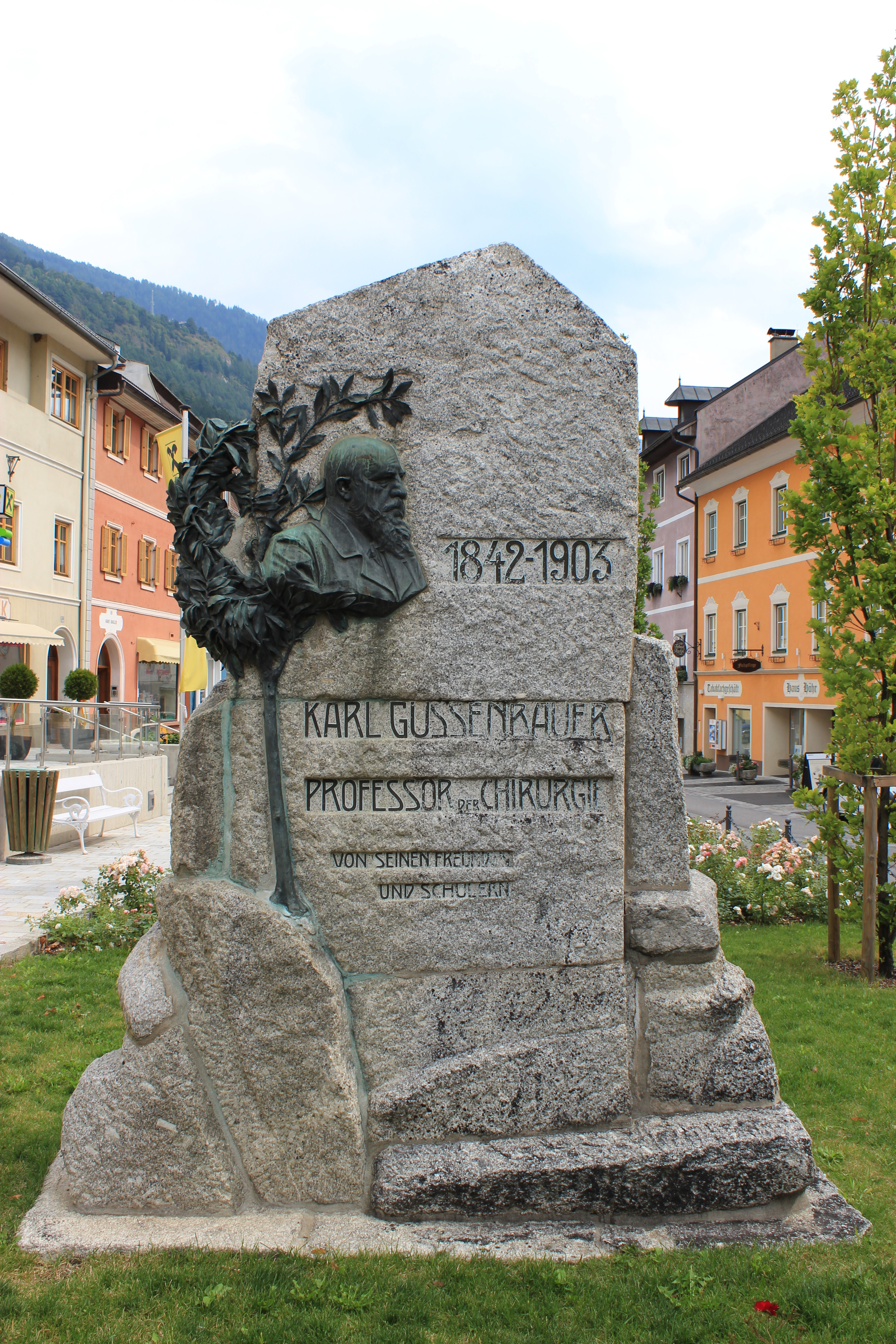
Gussenbauer memorial in Obervellach

Carl Gussenbauer (30 October 1842 – 19 June 1903) was an Austrian surgeon.

== Biography ==
Gussenbauer was a native of Obervellach. He received his medical doctorate in 1867 from the University of Vienna, and after graduation worked as an assistant to Theodor Billroth. Later on, he served as professor at the universities of Liège (from 1875) and Prague (from 1878). In 1894 he returned to Vienna, where he succeeded Billroth as director of the second surgical university clinic.

Gussenbauer was a pioneer of modern pancreatic surgery. In 1882 he performed the first successful operation of a pancreatic cyst via the external drainage technique that he developed. Prior to Gussenbauer's method, attempts at pancreatic surgery yielded negative results. Gussenbauer's external drainage procedure represented the first safe and effective solution for pancreatic cysts, and was widely used until the 1950s.

Following Billroth's first successful laryngectomy on 31 December 1873, Gussenbauer created an external vocal prosthesis (artificial larynx) for the patient. It was a mechanism with a vibrating reed that was inserted into a fistula from a tracheostomy tube to the pharynx. It was reported that the patient spoke with an intelligible voice.

== Principal works ==
- Die traumatischen Verletzungen (1880).
- Sephthämie, Pyohamie, und Pyo-Sephthämie (1882).
- Beitrag zur Extirpation von Beckenknochengeschwülsten (1891).

== Associated eponyms ==
- "Gussenbauer's suture": A figure-of-8 suture used in bowel surgery.
- "Gussenbauer's clamp": A bar of metal for joining the fragments in ununited fracture. Dorland's Medical Dictionary (1938).
- "Gussenbauer's operation": The cutting of an esophageal stricture through an opening above the stricture. Dorland's Medical Dictionary (1938).
