= Spittal an der Drau =

- Municipality
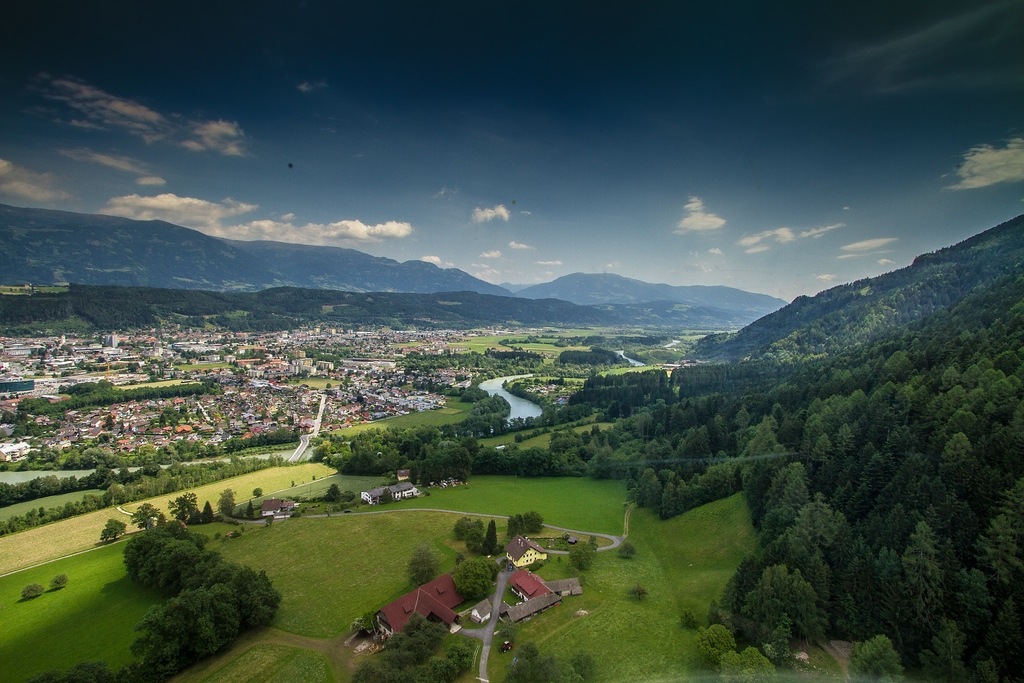
- View from Mt. Goldeck towards the Gurktal Alps

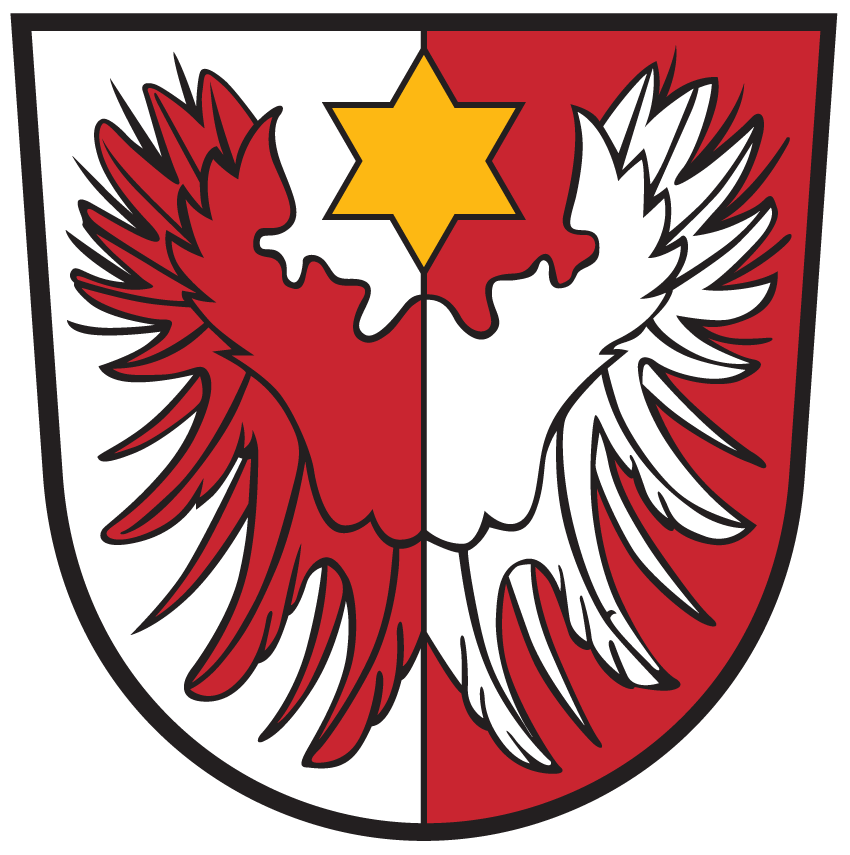
- Coat of arms

- Location within Austria
- Coordinates: 46°47′N 13°29′E
- Country: Austria
- State: Carinthia
- District: Spittal an der Drau

Government
  - Mayor: Gerhard Köfer (Team Kärnten)

Area
  - Total: 48.52 km^{2} (18.73 sq mi)
- Elevation: 560 m (1,840 ft)

Population (2018-01-01)
  - Total: 15,413
  - Density: 317.7/km^{2} (822.7/sq mi)
- Time zone: UTC+1 (CET)
  - Summer (DST): UTC+2 (CEST)
- Postal code: 9800, 9701, 9702
- Area code: 4762
- Website: www.spittal-drau.at

Spittal an der Drau is a town in the western part of the Austrian federal state of Carinthia. It is the administrative centre of Spittal an der Drau District, Austria's second largest district (Bezirk) by area.

== Geography ==
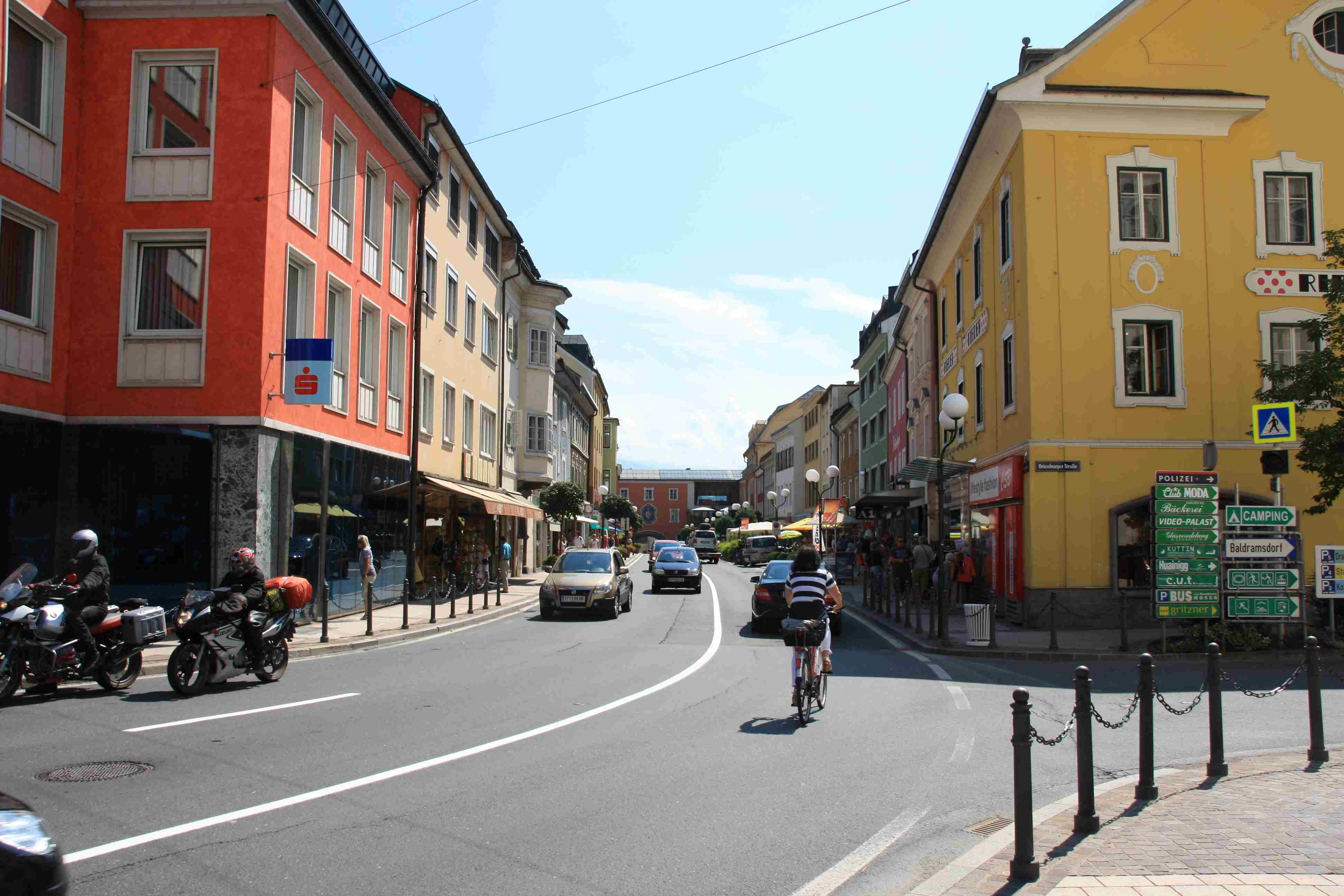
Main square

The town is located on the southern slopes of the Gurktal Alps (Nock Mountains), between the Lurnfeld Basin and the Lower Drau Valley. Despite its name, the historic core of Spittal originated on the banks of the small Lieser tributary, which flows into the Drau at the foot of Mt. Goldeck, a peak of the Gailtal Alps south of the town. Its summit can be reached by cable car.

The municipal area consists of seven Katastralgemeinden: Amlach, Edling, Großegg, Molzbichl, Olsach, Spittal proper, and St. Peter-Edling. In Großegg (incorporated in 1973), the area of Spittal extends to the southern shore of Lake Millstatt.

== History ==
The settlement was first mentioned in an 1191 deed issued by Archbishop Adalbert of Salzburg, when the local Carinthian counts Hermann I and Otto II of Ortenburg had a hospital (Spittl) with a chapel built where the ancient road leading to the Katschberg Pass and Salzburg crossed the Lieser river. The adjacent settlement received market rights in 1242. Together with the Ortenburg estates, Spittal in 1418 was inherited by Count Hermann II of Celje. The Counts of Cilli, raised to immediate Reichsgrafen in 1436, became extinct when Count Ulrich II was killed by the liegemen of László Hunyadi in 1456, after which the Habsburg emperor Frederick III, also Duke of Carinthia, seized his territory.

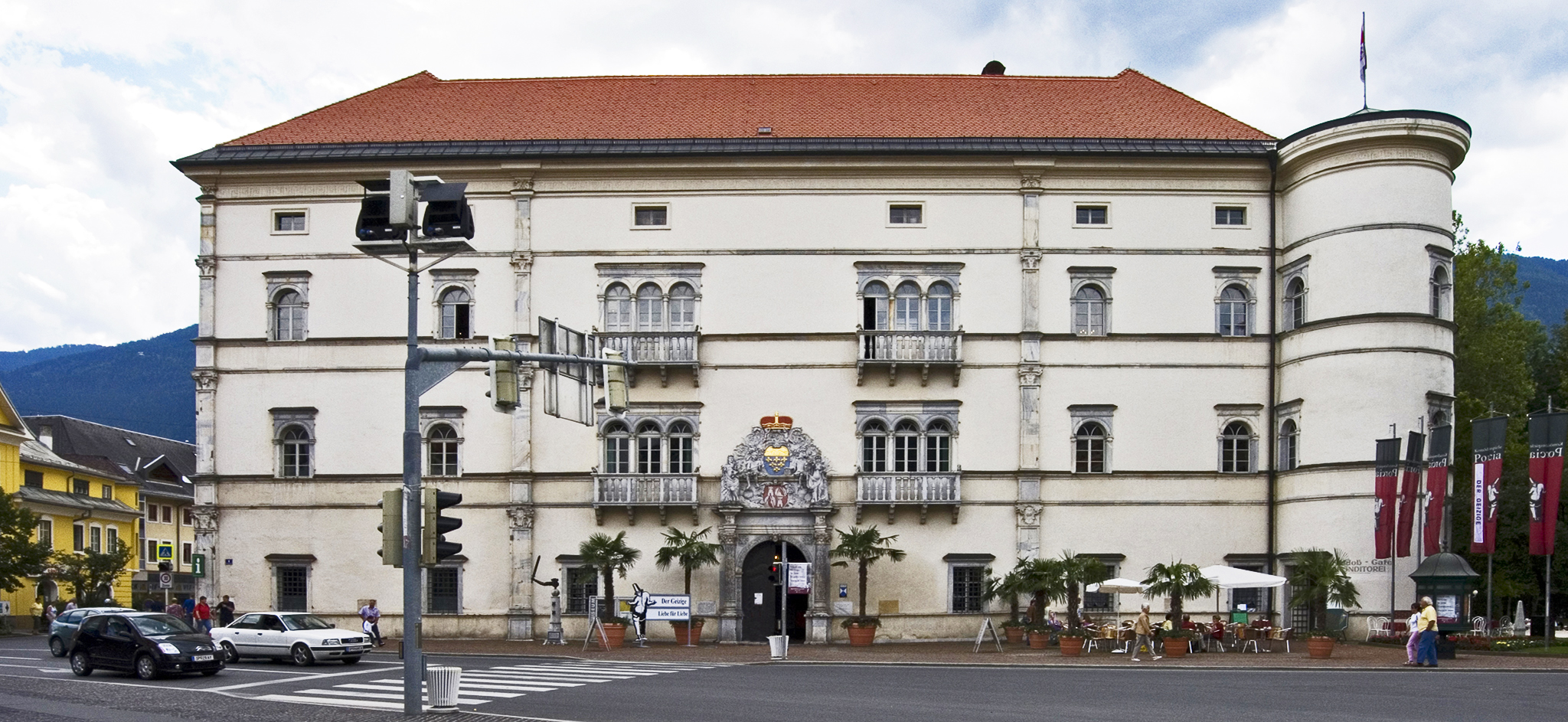
Porcia Castle

Frederick granted the citizens the right to choose their own judge and the council. However, Spittal and the surrounding lands were devastated by Turkish warriors in 1478 and shortly afterwards occupied by the Hungarian troops of Emperor Frederick's long-time rival King Matthias Corvinus. Further ravaged by a peasant's revolt and two fires in 1522 and 1729, the decline continued, until in 1524 Archduke Ferdinand I of Austria entrusted his treasurer Gabriel von Salamanca (1489–1539) with the former Ortenburg county.

From 1533 onwards, the Counts of Salamanca-Ortenburg had Schloss Porcia erected on the main square as their residence. The building in the style of an Italian palazzo is considered one of the most important Renaissance castles in Austria. They also rebuilt the Spittl hospital on the other side of the Lieser River and the late Gothic Catholic parish church of Mary's Annunciation upon Romanesque foundations of the 13th century. In 1662 Spittal passed to the Gorizia Counts of Porcia, owners of Schloss Porcia until 1918. Today the palace hosts an annual festival for classic theatrical comedies (Komödienspiele Porcia) and is also home of a museum of local history. In 1537 the Carinthian Khevenhüller noble family had a residence erected opposite the castle, nowadays serving as the town hall.

In 1797 Spittal was besieged by French troops in the course of the Napoleonic War of the First Coalition, in 1809 it fell with Upper Carinthia to the French Illyrian Provinces according to the Treaty of Schönbrunn. Restored to the Austrian Empire by the 1815 Congress of Vienna, the local economy was decisively promoted, when it gained access to the Austrian Southern Railway network in 1871. During the violent fights against Yugoslav troops before the Carinthian Plebiscite in 1920, Spittal for a short time was the provisional seat of the Carinthian state government, which had fled from Klagenfurt. It formally received town privileges on the occasion of the ten-years-anniversary in 1930. Since 1995 the Spittl has been a seat of the Carinthian Fachhochschule (University of Applied Sciences) for engineering ("Technikum").

== Sights ==
The most iconic sight in Spittal is the Porcia Castle (at. Schloss Porcia) with its park. The city council (at. Gemeinderat) has its seat in the Palace, whereas the mayor and the executive branch of the city government are located in the Gesindehaus opposite of Schloss Porcia, today's city hall.

The roman-catholic parish church of Mariä Verkündigung is the main church in the city and has a long history. The church combines several architectural styles: gothic nave, renaissance/baroque aisles and a modern choir. The main altar picture is a massive mosaic depicting the Annunciation to Mary by the Angel Gabriel. It is a unique piece made by the renowned mosaic-school in Spilimbergo. In and around the church many historic gravestones are located, whereas the crypt is not open to the public. The tower has, according to the inscriptions, been erected in 1899 in gothic style, and is a landmark of the city.

== Molzbichl ==
East of the town, within the Drau Valley lies the village of Molzbichl. Several historic gravestones are located in and around the church. The tower was built according to the inscription in 1899 in gothic style and is a landmark of the city. lzbichl, which is home to the remains of Carinthia's first monastery, established about 780 by Duke Tassilo III of Bavaria and abandoned in the 10th century. A small museum nearby shows several artifacts of Carolingian origin. The foundation of the monastery church is visible south of the present parish church Saint Tiburtius, which itself has an altar including a Roman tombstone of an Early Christian deacon Nonnosus, who died here in 532.

On a slope above the valley, northeast of Molzbichl is Schloss Rothenthurn, in the 11th century called "Red Tower" (Roter Turm), a fiefdom of the Counts of Ortenburg. The present-day palace is a building from the 17th century and serves as a hotel.

== Politics ==
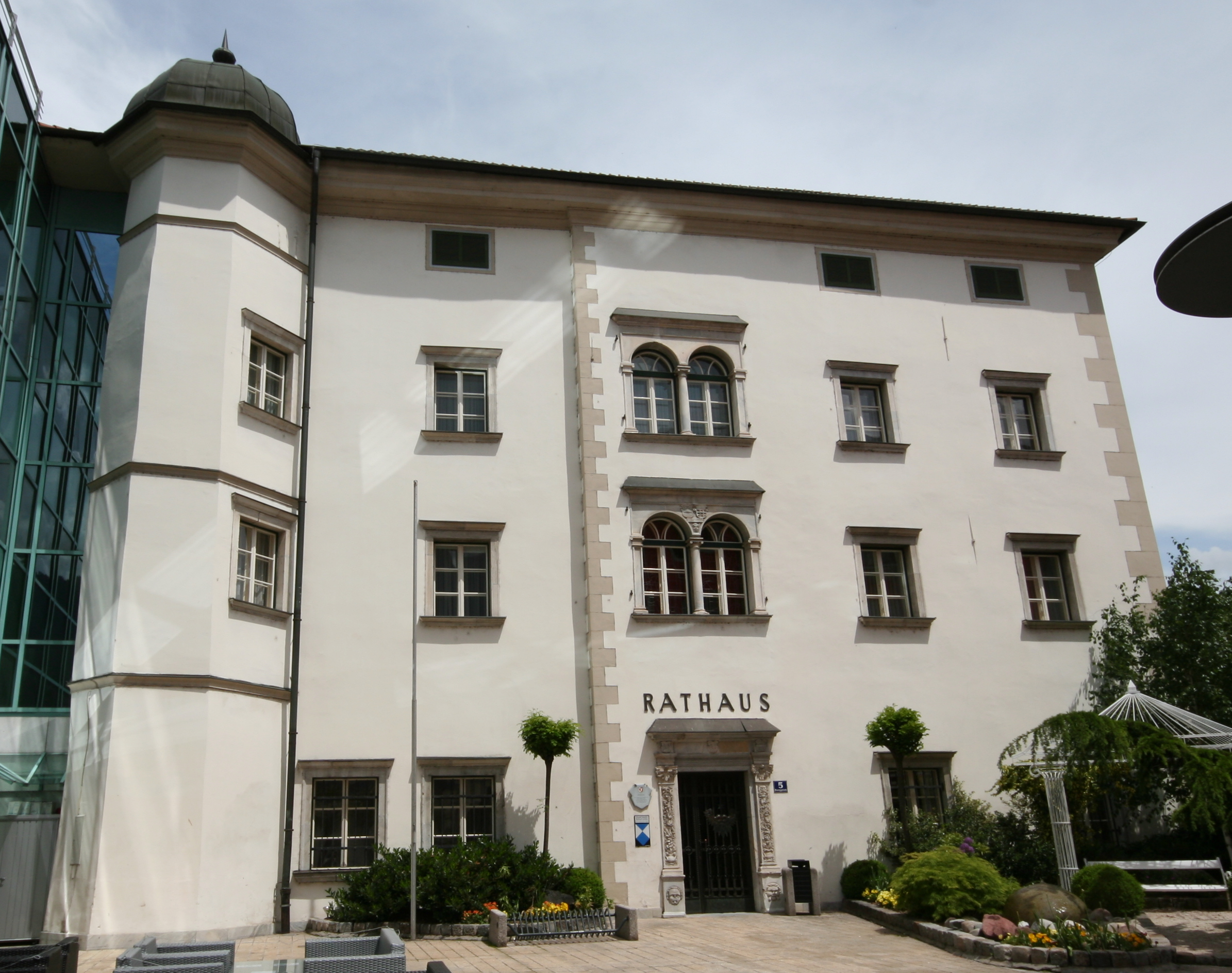
Town hall

The municipal council (Gemeinderat) consists of 31 members. Since the 2021 local elections, it is made up of the following parties:

- Social Democratic Party of Austria (SPÖ): 10 seats
- Team Carinthia - Gerhard Köfer (TK): 10 seats
- Freedom Party of Austria (FPÖ): 5 seats
- Austrian People's Party (ÖVP): 4 seats
- NEOS - The New Austria and Liberal Forum (NEOS): 1 seat
- The Greens - The Green Alternative (GRÜNE): 1 seat

The mayor, Gerhard Köfer (TK), was elected in 2021, defeating incumbent Gerhard Pirih (SPÖ).

== Notable people ==
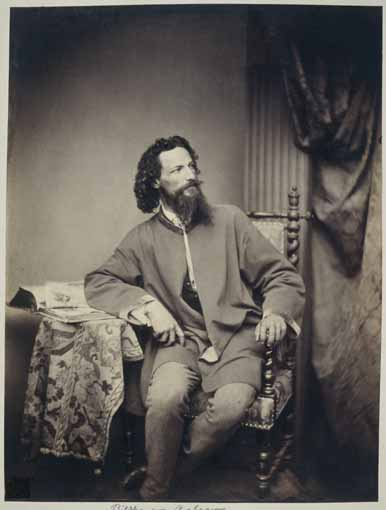
Hanns Gasser

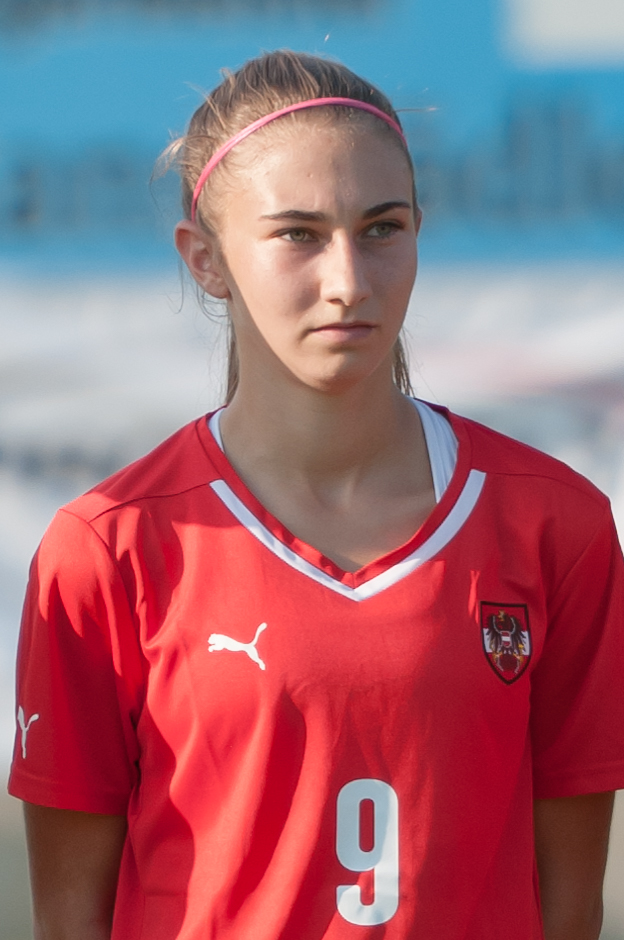
Katharina Naschenweng, 2015

- Virgil von Graben (15th C. — 1507) noble and knight, stadtholder of Lienz and East Tyrol and Regent (captain) and stadtholder of Province of Gorizia (Görz).
- Rosina von Graben von Rain zu Sommeregg, (15th C. in Sommeregg - 1534) noble woman from the House of Graben von Stein a cadet branch of the Meinhardiner dynasty
- David Pacher (1816 in Obervellach – 1902) priest and botanist
- Hans Gasser (1817 in Eisentratten – 1868) painter and sculptor
- Carl Gussenbauer (1842 in Obervellach – 1903) surgeon.
- Gustav Weindorfer (1874 in Spittal – 1932) Australian amateur botanist, lodge-keeper and promoter of the Cradle Mountains National Park in Tasmania
- Max Beier (1903 in Spittal – 1979) arachnologist, entomologist and specialist in pseudoscorpions
- Walter Zellot (1920 in Spittal – 1942) World War II fighter ace
- Herbert Haupt (born 1947 in Seeboden) politician, party chairman Austrian Freedom Party a veterinarian by training,

=== Sport ===
- Eberhard Steinböck (born 1882 in Spittal - 1970) sports shooter in the 1912 Summer Olympics
- Hans Kary (born 1949 in Spittal), former professional tennis player
- Joachim Wendt (born 1962 in Spittal) fencer, competed at five consecutive Summer Olympics from 1984 to 2000
- Roland Kaspitz (born 1981 in Spittal) ice hockey forward who plays for HDD Olimpija Ljubljana
- Thomas Morgenstern (born 1986 in Spittal) former ski jumper who competed from 2002 to 2014 and won three Olympic gold medals
- Lukas Gugganig (born 1995) footballer who has played over 230 games
- Katharina Naschenweng (born 1997 in Spittal) footballer who plays for Bayern Munich and has played 38 games for Austria women

== Transportation ==
The city has a railway station on the Tauernbahn railway line from Villach to Salzburg. It lies also near the A10 Tauern Autobahn as well as on the Bundesstraßen highways B99 Katschberg-Straße leading to the Katschberg Pass and the B100 Drautal-Straße to Lienz in East Tyrol. A cableway runs up to Mount Goldeck (2,142 m).

== Twin towns – sister cities ==
Spittal an der Drau is twinned with:

- Löhne, Germany (1973)
- Pordenone, Italy (1987)
- Porcia, Italy (1987)
- Kočevje, Slovenia (2014)
