= Bourg-Saint-Maurice =

Bourg-Saint-Maurice Bôrg-Sant-Mori (Arpitan)
- Commune
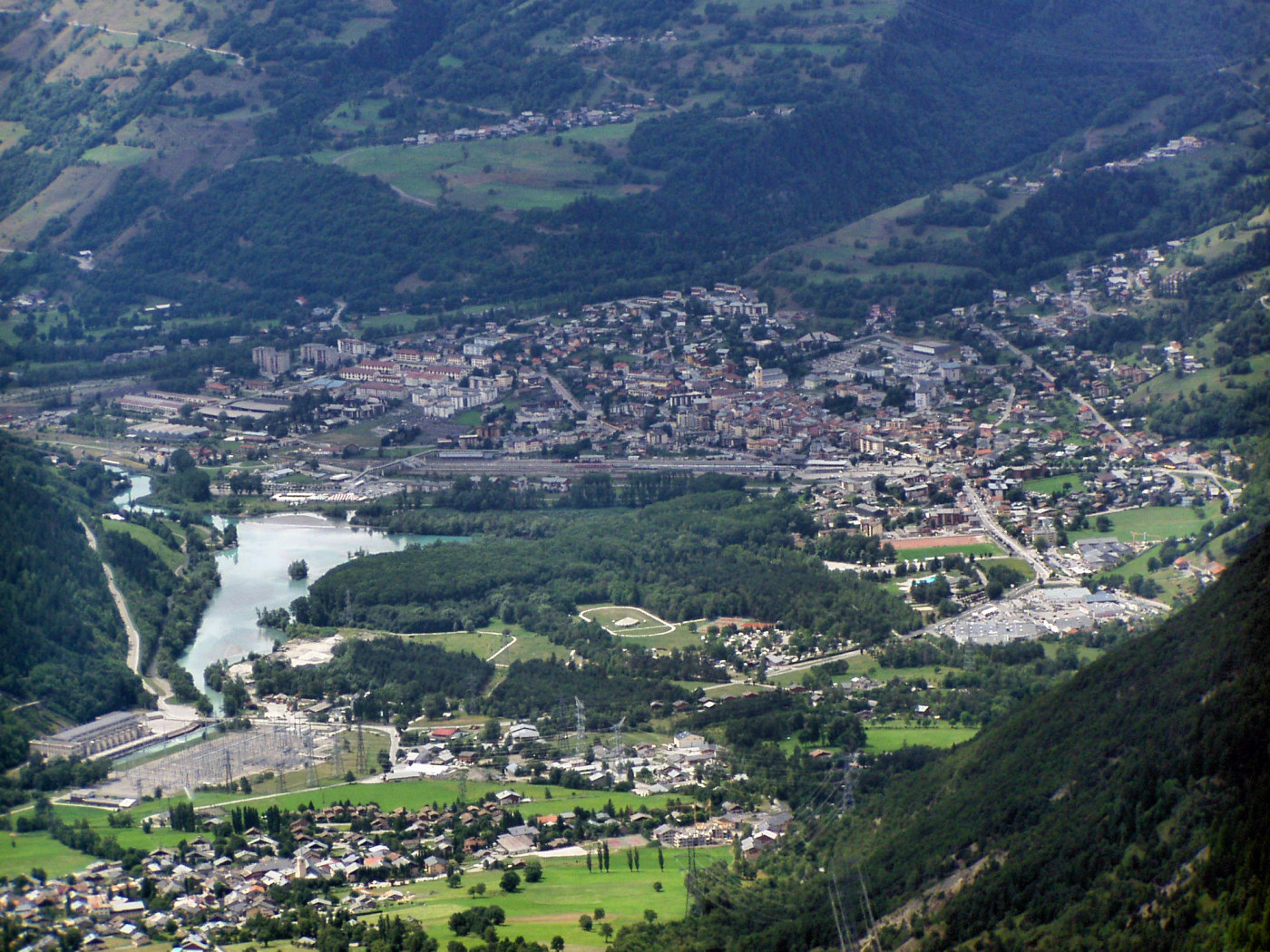
- A general view of Bourg-Saint-Maurice

- Coat of arms
- Location of Bourg-Saint-Maurice
- Location within France Location within Auvergne-Rhône-Alpes
- Coordinates: 45°37′03″N 6°46′10″E
- Country: France
- Region: Auvergne-Rhône-Alpes
- Department: Savoie
- Arrondissement: Albertville
- Canton: Bourg-Saint-Maurice

Government
  - Mayor (2020–2026): Guillaume Desrues
- Area^{1}: 179.07 km^{2} (69.14 sq mi)
- Elevation: 815 m (2,674 ft)
- Highest elevation: 3,823 m (12,543 ft)
- Lowest elevation: 744 m (2,441 ft)
- Population (2023): 7,270
  - Density: 40.6/km^{2} (105/sq mi)
- Time zone: UTC+01:00 (CET)
  - Summer (DST): UTC+02:00 (CEST)
- INSEE/Postal code: 73054 /73700
- ^{1} French Land Register data, which excludes lakes, ponds, glaciers > 1 km^{2} (0.386 sq mi or 247 acres) and river estuaries.

Bourg-Saint-Maurice (French pronunciation: [buʁ sɛ̃ mɔʁis, - moʁ-]; Arpitan: Bôrg-Sant-Mori or simply Le Bôrg), commonly known as Saint-Maurice, is a commune in the Savoie department in the Auvergne-Rhône-Alpes region in south-eastern France. Located on the Italian border south of Chamonix-Mont-Blanc, it serves as a transport hub for the Paradiski ski area, with direct rail travel from London (Connecting in Lille), Brussels and Amsterdam during the winter.

== History ==
Bergintrum was a place on the Gallic side of the pass of the Alpes Graiae, lying on the road marked in the Antonine Itinerary between Mediolanum (modern Milan) and Vienna (modern Vienne, Isère). Jean-Baptiste Bourguignon d'Anville (Notice, etc.) placed it between Axima (modern Aime) and Alpis Graia. The distance from Bergintrum to Axima, marked viiii M. P. The Alpis Graia, is usually identified with a settlement at the watershed on the Pass of the Little Saint Bernard, which divides the waters that flow to the Isère on the French side from those that flow to the Dora Baltea on the Italian side. This is the place D'Anville calls L'Hôpital, on the authority of a manuscript map of the country. D'Anville first proposed the identification of Bergintrum with Bourg-Saint-Maurice; although he acknowledged that xii, the distance in the Table between Bergintrum and Alpis Graia, does not fit the distance between Bourg-Saint-Maurice and L'Hôpital, which is less. Modern scholarship confirms the identification. In the course of the French Revolution, Bourg-Saint-Maurice was briefly renamed Nargue-Sarde between 1794 and 1815.

== Geography ==
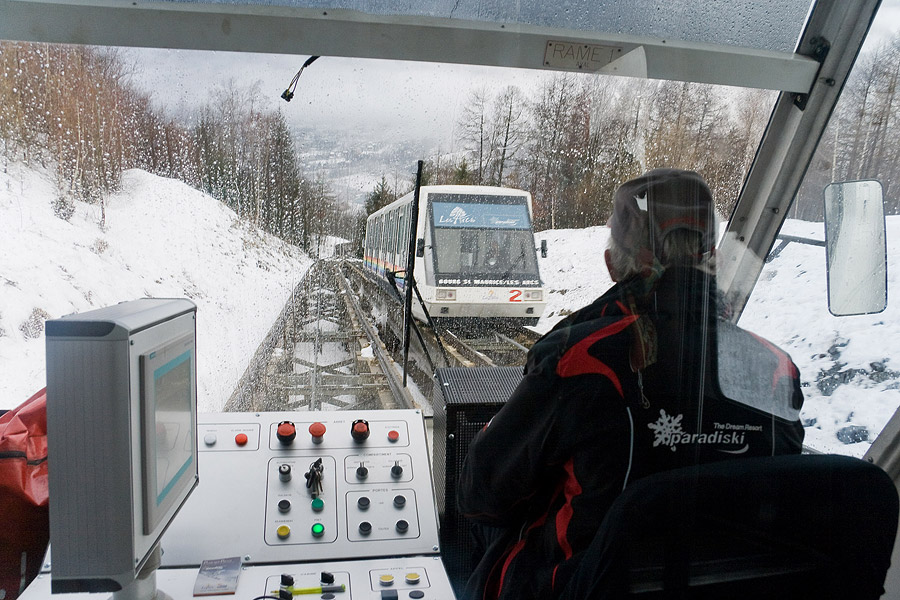
Arc en Ciel funicular railway

Located in the arrondissement of Albertville in the Savoie department in the Auvergne-Rhône-Alpes region, Bourg-Saint-Maurice is the last town along the Tarentaise Valley in the heart of the French Alps.

=== Transport ===
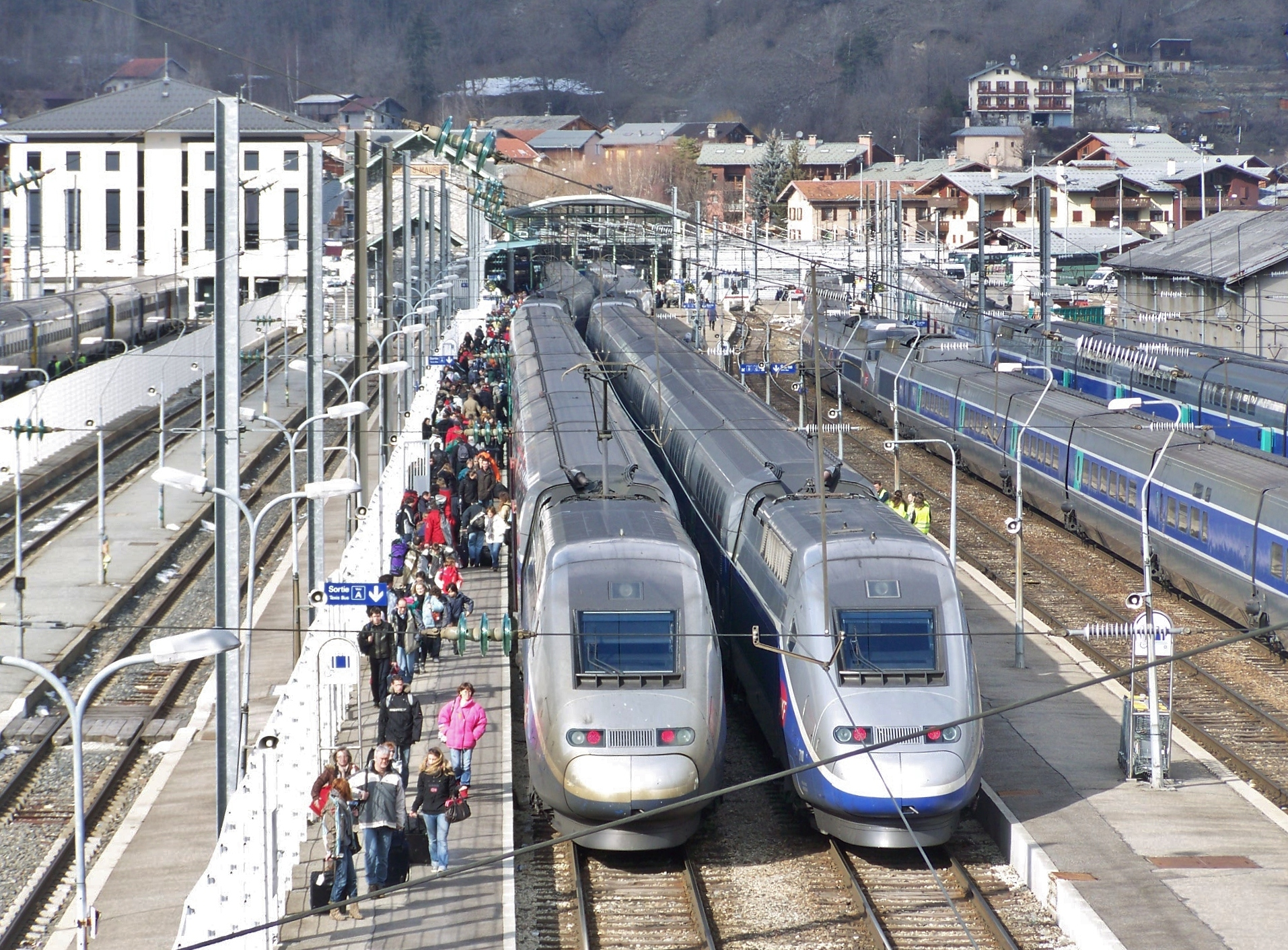
TGVs at Bourg-Saint-Maurice railway station

Bourg-Saint-Maurice station is linked to the TGV network, and has services direct from Lille (Eurostar) and Amsterdam (Thalys) in the winter. The Arc en Ciel funicular railway links the town to the Arc 1600 ski area.

=== Climate ===
Located in the far east of France, Bourg-Saint-Maurice is right on the boundary between the warm-summer humid continental climate (Dfb) and the oceanic climate (Cfb) under the Köppen system. Winters are long, cold, with at least five months of below-freezing temperatures, especially at night. Summers are usually warm and stormy.

Climate data for Bourg-Saint-Maurice (1991−2020 normals, extremes 1946−present)
Month	Jan	Feb	Mar	Apr	May	Jun	Jul	Aug	Sep	Oct	Nov	Dec	Year
Record high °C (°F)	16.0 (60.8)	21.5 (70.7)	25.6 (78.1)	28.6 (83.5)	33.8 (92.8)	37.6 (99.7)	38.4 (101.1)	37.5 (99.5)	33.1 (91.6)	28.7 (83.7)	23.5 (74.3)	17.6 (63.7)	38.4 (101.1)
Mean daily maximum °C (°F)	5.7 (42.3)	7.8 (46.0)	12.8 (55.0)	16.2 (61.2)	20.4 (68.7)	24.5 (76.1)	26.7 (80.1)	26.4 (79.5)	21.9 (71.4)	16.9 (62.4)	10.2 (50.4)	5.7 (42.3)	16.3 (61.3)
Daily mean °C (°F)	1.2 (34.2)	2.5 (36.5)	6.7 (44.1)	10.1 (50.2)	14.2 (57.6)	17.8 (64.0)	19.8 (67.6)	19.5 (67.1)	15.6 (60.1)	11.3 (52.3)	5.6 (42.1)	1.7 (35.1)	10.5 (50.9)
Mean daily minimum °C (°F)	−3.2 (26.2)	−2.8 (27.0)	0.7 (33.3)	4.1 (39.4)	7.9 (46.2)	11.2 (52.2)	12.9 (55.2)	12.6 (54.7)	9.3 (48.7)	5.7 (42.3)	1.1 (34.0)	−2.2 (28.0)	4.8 (40.6)
Record low °C (°F)	−21.3 (−6.3)	−19.6 (−3.3)	−15.1 (4.8)	−7.5 (18.5)	−2.3 (27.9)	0.4 (32.7)	2.9 (37.2)	2.9 (37.2)	−1.2 (29.8)	−6.0 (21.2)	−13.2 (8.2)	−18.1 (−0.6)	−21.3 (−6.3)
Average precipitation mm (inches)	100.8 (3.97)	75.9 (2.99)	73.8 (2.91)	57.3 (2.26)	83.2 (3.28)	82.0 (3.23)	81.2 (3.20)	78.4 (3.09)	67.7 (2.67)	77.7 (3.06)	83.9 (3.30)	113.7 (4.48)	975.6 (38.41)
Average precipitation days (≥ 1.0 mm)	8.9	8.3	8.3	7.6	10.9	10.8	9.5	9.2	8.3	9.3	9.2	9.6	110.0
Mean monthly sunshine hours	109.6	122.0	169.5	176.3	200.0	226.0	249.4	231.6	188.9	142.5	99.2	93.9	2,008.8
Source: Météo-France

== Population ==
Historical population
Year	Pop.	±% p.a.
1968	3,931	—
1975	4,748	+2.73%
1982	5,839	+3.00%
1990	6,056	+0.46%
1999	6,747	+1.21%
2007	7,681	+1.63%
2012	7,741	+0.16%
2017	7,302	−1.16%
2023	7,270	−0.07%
Source: INSEE

== Landmarks ==
Ouvrage Chatelard is a lesser work (petit ouvrage) of the Maginot Line's Alpine extension, the Alpine Line, also known as the Little Maginot Line. Begun in 1938, the ouvrage consists of one infantry block about one kilometre north-east of the town, in the village of Le Chatelard. A short gallery with cross galleries extends into the rock, with an emergency exit and ventilation shaft halfway back. The ouvrage was incomplete in 1940, under the command of Sub-Lieutenant Bochaton.

== Religious sites ==
The Catholic church of St Maurice is on Grande Rue in the centre of town, the Protestant church is on Avenue Maréchal Leclerc to the south.

== Economy ==
Bourg-Saint-Maurice provides accommodation and a transport hub for the Paradiski ski area.

== Notable people ==
The French ski mountaineer Bertrand Blanc was born in Bourg-Saint-Maurice on 29 October 1973. It is also the birthplace of French politician Hervé Gaymard (31 May 1960).

== See also ==
- Communes of the Savoie department
