= Wickliffe Walker =

American canoeist

Wickliffe Wade Walker, also called Wick Walker, (born June 29, 1946 in Washington, D.C.) is an American slalom canoeist, whitewater explorer, soldier, and author. He represented the US in the World Championships of 1965, 1967, and 1971, and he was US National Champion in Men's C-1 Slalom in 1968. He finished 11th in the C-1 event at the 1972 Summer Olympics in Munich.

== Career ==
In the 1960s and early 1970s he and paddling partner Tom McEwan made early pioneering runs of Appalachian whitewater rivers, including the Upper Blackwater (WVA), Lower Meadow (WVA) and the Linville Gorge (NC). In 1975 he, Tom McEwan, and Dan Schnurrenberger made the first known successful descent of the Great Falls of the Potomac, near Washington DC. He and Tom McEwan conducted whitewater expeditions to Bhutan (1981), Newfoundland (1984), Mexico (1985), Quebec (1989) and the Yarlung Tsangpo Grand Canyon in Tibet (1997-1998), frequently accompanied by Tom McEwan's brother Jamie McEwan and by Douglas C. Gordon. Wick Walker, Tom McEwan and Jamie McEwan all attended the Landon School for Boys in Bethesda, Maryland and all three were members of the wrestling team.

=== Military career ===
After graduation from Dartmouth College in 1968 with a degree in geology, he served twenty-one years in the United States Army as a Combat Engineer, Military Intelligence, and Special Forces officer. He retired in 1990 in the rank of lieutenant colonel after overseas service in Vietnam, Thailand, and Germany. He holds the Legion of Merit, the Bronze Star, the Meritorious Service Medal, and the Joint Service Commendation Medal.

=== Writing career ===
He is the author of:

Paddling the Frontier: Guide to Pakistan's Whitewater

Courting the Diamond Sow: A Whitewater Expedition on Tibet's Forbidden River

Goat Game: Thirteen Tales from the Afghan Frontier

He is a National Geographic Society Explorer and a Fellow of The Explorers Club.
