= Michael Webber =

Michael Webber may refer to:

- Michael Webber (engineer) (born 1971), American engineering professor
- Michael Webber (politician) (born 1978), American politician from Michigan
- Michael Webber (priest) (fl. 1950s–1970s), English priest
- Michael Webber (filmmaker) (fl. 2000s–present), American film producer, director, and cinematographer
- Mike Webber, General Hospital character

== See also ==
- Michael Weber (disambiguation)
- Michel Weber (born 1963), Belgian philosopher
- Michel Weber (canoeist) (fl. 1961), Swiss slalom canoeist
