= Predictions of Fire =

- Directed by: Michael Benson
- Written by: Michael Benson
- Starring: Laibach (band); Peter Mlakar; Slavoj Žižek
- Release date: October 2, 1996
- Country: United States
- Language: English

Predictions of Fire or Prerokbe ognja is a 1996 documentary film by American filmmaker Michael Benson about Neue Slowenische Kunst.

== Synopsis ==
In 1991, SR Slovenia's violent secession from SFR Yugoslavia marked the first spark in the Yugoslav Wars that defined the first chapter of the post-cold war era. Using a combination of reportage, dramatization, archival footage, animation and miniatures, Predictions of Fire studies the controversial and internationally acclaimed Slovenian arts collective NSK, as seen through the lens of 20th century Central European history. Shot in Ljubljana, Moscow, New York City, Belgrade, and Athens, the film offers a portrait of a culture suspended between East and West. By documenting NSK, Predictions of Fire holds a mirror up to Europe and the world, analyzing the way nations are brought into conformity with ideology.

In the early 1980s, an industrial rock band named Laibach emerged from SR Slovenia, a Yugoslav constituent republic. Incorporating what many took to be fascist imagery in their performances, they shocked this small Balkan republic and, after signing a recording contract with London's Mute Records label, went on to shock the rest of the world as well. Laibach was soon joined by a painting group, IRWIN, and theater group, Scipion Nasice Sisters Theatre, at the helm of one of the most ambitious and cutting-edge arts collectives in the world. Modeled after a socialist state bureaucracy, and calling themselves Neue Slowenische Kunst (New Slovenian Arts, or NSK), these three groups became the titular heads of a micro-state within the independent republic of Slovenia. NSK recently began issuing its own passports and opened embassies and consulates in Moscow, Berlin, Ghent, Florence, and in the US.

Although Predictions of Fire documents the NSK collective, positioning their work within the history of ex-Yugoslavia, the film emerges as much more than an arts documentary. Predictions of Fire offers surprising insight into the Yugoslav conflict and the ongoing trauma experienced by generations of Eastern Europeans raised in totalitarian regimes.

== Reception ==
Variety wrote that the film "uses a postmodern, quasi-Godardian sensibility to show how politics invades every facet of artistic creation and how integral ideology is to the understanding of the structure and signification of images... An extremely rich tapestry of historical events and their mythic implications in both art and politics unfolds onscreen."

The film won the National Film Board of Canada's Best Documentary Award at the 1996 Vancouver International Film Festival. The jury issued a statement: "Predictions of Fire is intellectual dynamite. It explodes the icons and myths of communism and capitalism. Out of the shattered history of Slovenia, this film constructs a new way of looking at art, politics, and religion."

Predictions of Fire also won the Best Documentary Feature award at the 1996 "Message to Man" St. Petersburg International Film Festival (Russia). The film had a limited North American theatrical release, including a run at New York City's Film Forum art house cinema.

== See also ==
- NSK
- Laibach
- Slavoj Žižek
- St. James's Bridge - a bridge made famous by this documentary
