= Baumruk =

Baumruk is a Czech surname.

Notable people with this surname include:

- Jiří Baumruk, Czech basketball player
- Kellie Baumruk, also known as Kellie Gerardi, American space scientist
- Miroslav Baumruk, Czech basketball player
- Petr Baumruk, Czech handball player
- Zdeněk Baumruk, Czechoslovak canoeist
