= Ute Strompel =

Sport
- Sport: Kayaking
- Event: Folding kayak
Medal record
Women's canoe slalom
Representing East Germany
World Championships
Bronze medal – third place	1961 Hainsberg	Folding K-1

Ute Strompel is a retired East German slalom canoeist who competed in the early 1960s. She won a bronze medal in the K-1 event at the 1961 ICF Canoe Slalom World Championships in Hainsberg.
