= Gernot Bergmann =

East German slalom canoeist

Medal record

Men's canoe slalom

Representing East Germany

World Championships
Gold medal – first place	1961 Hainsberg	C-2 team

Gernot Bergmann is a former East German slalom canoeist who competed in the 1960s. He won a gold medal in the C-2 team event at the 1961 ICF Canoe Slalom World Championships in Hainsberg.
