= St. James's Bridge =

Bridge in Ljubljana, Slovenia

Coordinates: 46°2′45.13″N 14°30′20.12″E

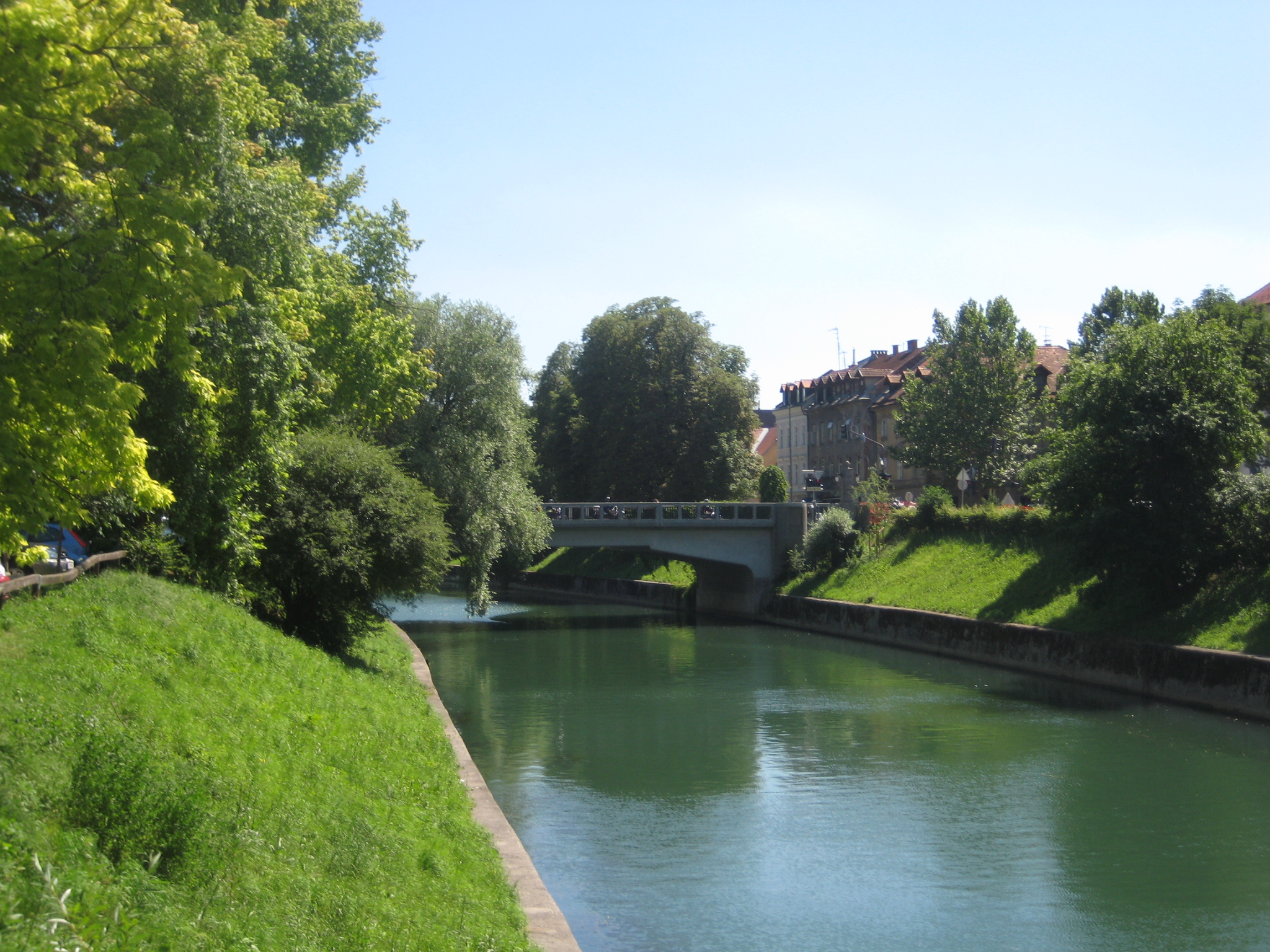
St. James's Bridge in 2009

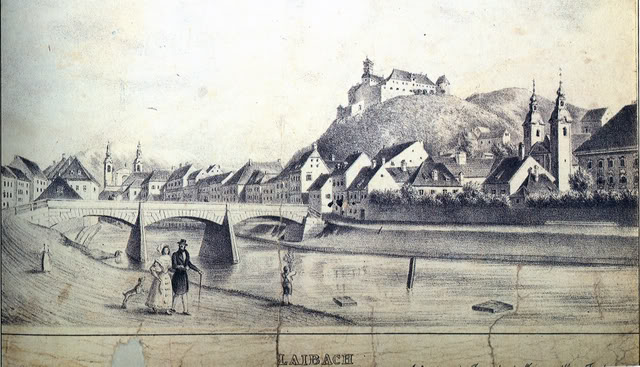
St. James's Bridge in 1836

St. James's Bridge (Slovene: Šentjakobski most) in Ljubljana is a bridge that crosses the Ljubljanica River on the southern end of downtown Ljubljana, next to Zois Manor. It links Zois Street (Zoisova cesta) and Karlovac Street (Karlovška cesta). The most important city traffic artery across the Ljubljanica runs across it.

== Background ==
A wooden bridge was constructed at this place in 1824, later than other bridges of the period, and for a long time it was therefore called the New Bridge (German: Neue Brücke). In 1915, it was replaced by a reinforced concrete corbel bridge by the engineer Alois Král and the architect Alfred Keller. It was described by the art historian Damjan Prelovšek as a "monumental neo-Biedermeier architectural language of late-Secession Vienna."

Since 1954, there has been a plaque with an inscription on the bridge about a 15th-century town watermill, which caused damage to farmers and was destroyed in the 1515 peasant revolt. Four bronze relief plaques depicting scenes from The Water Man, a Ljubljana-related Romantic ballad by the poet France Prešeren, were intended to be put on the fence of the bridge. However, this has been never realised.

The bridge was the backdrop of a notable scene in the 1996 documentary Predictions of Fire, in which Slavoj Žižek stood on it to make the sarcastic claim that the Ljubljanica was the "official geographical border between the Balkans and Central Europe":

"On the other side: horror, Oriental despotism; women get beaten, get raped, and like it. On this side: Europe, civilization; women get beaten, get raped, but don't like it. So, Balkan, Mitteleuropa, dont forget it."
