= John Albert =

John Albert may refer to:

- John I Albert (1459–1501), King of Poland
- Duke John Albert of Mecklenburg (1857–1920)
- John Albert (canoeist) (born 1949), British slalom canoer
- John Albert (fighter) (born 1986), American mixed martial artist
- John Albert (ice hockey) (born 1989), American ice hockey player
- John David Albert (1810–1899), mountain man, born in Hagerstown, Maryland
- John F. Albert (1915–1989), Deputy Chief of Chaplains of the U.S. Air Force
