= Jan Niemiec =

Jan Niemiec may refer to:

- Jan Niemiec (bishop) (1958–2020), Polish-born Ukrainian Roman Catholic bishop
- Jan Niemiec (canoeist) (1941–2017), Polish slalom canoeist
