= Jaroslav Vyhlíd =

Sport
- Sport: Kayaking
- Event: Folding kayak
Medal record
Men's canoe slalom
Representing Czechoslovakia
World Championships
Silver medal – second place	1961 Hainsberg	Folding K-1 team

Jaroslav Vyhlíd is a Czechoslovak retired slalom canoeist who competed in the early 1960s. He won a silver medal in the folding K-1 team event at the 1961 ICF Canoe Slalom World Championships in Hainsberg.
