= 1961 ICF Canoe Slalom World Championships =

Canoe slalom event in Hainsberg, East Germany

The 1961 ICF Canoe Slalom World Championships were held in Hainsberg, East Germany under the auspices of International Canoe Federation. It was the 7th edition. The women's folding K1 team event was not held at these championships after taking place in the previous one.

== Medal summary ==
=== Men's ===
==== Canoe ====
Event	Gold	Points	Silver	Points	Bronze	Points
C1	Manfred Schubert (GDR)	481.4	Bohuslav Pospíchal (TCH)	486.4	Ingo Kirsch (GDR)	487.1
C1 team	Czechoslovakia; Tibor Sýkora; Jaroslav Pollert; Bohuslav Pospíchal	708.4	East Germany; Karl-Heinz Wozniak; Manfred Schubert; Gert Kleinert	735.3	Switzerland; Jean-Claude Tochon; Michel Weber; Marcel Roth	865.3
C2	East Germany; Günther Merkel; Manfred Merkel	408.0	Czechoslovakia; Zdeněk Valenta; Miroslav Stach	413.9	East Germany; Dieter Friedrich; Horst Kleinert	442.9
C2 team	East Germany; Horst Rosenhagen & Gernot Bergmann; Günther Merkel & Manfred Merkel; Dieter Friedrich & Horst Kleinert	546.5	Czechoslovakia; Zdeněk Valenta & Miroslav Stach; Vladimír Lánský & Josef Hendrych; Josef Polák & Zdeněk Baumruk	678.3	Switzerland; Jean Pessina & Robert Zürcher; Charles Dussuet & Jean-Paul Rössinger; Jean Meichtry & Suchet	859.4

==== Kayak ====
Event	Gold	Points	Silver	Points	Bronze	Points
Folding K1	Eberhard Gläser (GDR)	351.5	Roland Hahnebach (GDR)	367.7	Jiří Černý (TCH)	369.9
Folding K1 team	East Germany; Roland Hahnebach; Eberhard Gläser; Horst Wängler	411.0	Czechoslovakia; Zdeněk Košťál; Jiří Černý; Jaroslav Vyhlíd	526.8	Poland; Jan Niemiec; Władysław Piecyk; Eugeniusz Kapłaniak	620.7

=== Mixed ===
==== Canoe ====
Event	Gold	Points	Silver	Points	Bronze	Points
C2	Czechoslovakia; Vratislava Nováková; Karel Novák	527.0	East Germany; Edith Nickel; Willi Landers	541.3	Czechoslovakia; Jarmila Pacherová; Václav Nič	551.5

=== Women's ===
==== Kayak ====
Event	Gold	Points	Silver	Points	Bronze	Points
Folding K1	Ludmila Veberová (TCH)	511.4	Anneliese Bauer (GDR)	574.0	Ute Strompel (GDR)	617.4

== Medals table ==
Rank	Nation	Gold	Silver	Bronze	Total
1	East Germany (GDR)	5	4	3	12
2	Czechoslovakia (TCH)	3	4	2	9
3	Switzerland (SUI)	0	0	2	2
4	Poland (POL)	0	0	1	1
Totals (4 entries)		8	8	8	24
