= Ingo Kirsch =

East German slalom canoeist

Medal record

Men's canoe slalom

Representing East Germany

World Championships
Bronze medal – third place	1961 Hainsberg	C-1

Ingo Kirsch is a retired East German slalom canoeist who competed in the early-to-mid 1960s. He won a bronze medal in the C-1 event at the 1961 ICF Canoe Slalom World Championships in Hainsberg.
