= Hochevar =

Hochevar is a surname, a respelling of Hočevar. Notable people with the surname include:

- Brittany Hochevar (born 1981), American volleyball player
- Luke Hochevar (born 1983), American baseball pitcher
