= Josef Polák =

Medal record

Men's canoe slalom

Representing Czechoslovakia

World Championships
Silver medal – second place	1961 Hainsberg	C-2 team

Josef Polák is a retired Czechoslovak slalom canoeist who competed in the early 1960s. He won a silver medal in the C-2 team event at the 1961 ICF Canoe Slalom World Championships in Hainsberg.
