= Tibor Sýkora =

Czechoslovak slalom canoeist

Medal record

Men's canoe slalom

Representing Czechoslovakia

World Championships
Gold medal – first place	1961 Hainsberg	C1 team

Tibor Sýkora (born 18 September 1938) is a former Czechoslovak slalom canoeist of Slovak nationality who competed in the 1960s. He won a gold medal in the C1 team event at the 1961 ICF Canoe Slalom World Championships in Hainsberg. He also finished 5th in the individual C1 event at the same World Championships.

Sýkora started out as a middle distance runner, but had to change sports after tearing both his achilles heels in 3000m steeplechase run. In 1970 he and another canoeist saved the lives of a man and a four-year old girl after their boat capsized on the Danube, a feat for which they received an award from the Czechoslovak president. However, they were unable to rescue the girl's mother.
