= Edith Nickel =

Medal record

Women's canoe slalom

Representing East Germany

World Championships
Silver medal – second place	1961 Hainsberg	Mixed C-2

Edith Nickel is a retired East German slalom canoeist who competed in the early 1960s. She won a silver medal in the mixed C-2 event at the 1961 ICF Canoe Slalom World Championships in Hainsberg.
