= Meichtry =

Meichtry is a surname. Notable people with the surname include:

- Dominik Meichtry (born 1984), Swiss competitive swimmer
- Ethan Meichtry (born 2005), Swiss footballer
- Jean Meichtry, Swiss slalom canoeist
