= Michael Weber (disambiguation) =

Michael Weber (1966–1999) was an Australian guitarist.

Michael or Mike Weber may also refer to:

- Mike Weber (American football) (born 1997), American football player
- Mike Weber (born 1987), American ice hockey player
- Michael H. Weber (born 1978), American screenwriter and producer
- Michaël Weber (born 1974), French politician
- Michael Weber (magician) (1966–1999), American magician
- Michael J. Weber (1942–2021), American research scientist

== See also ==
- Michael Webber (disambiguation)
- Michel Weber (born 1963), Belgian philosopher
- Michel Weber (canoeist) (fl. 1961), Swiss slalom canoeist
