= East Art Map =

East Art Map (EAM) is a multimedia, archival, and art historical project by the Slovenian artist group IRWIN in 2001.

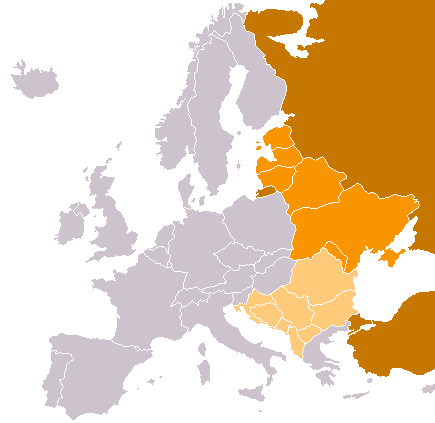
Eastern Europe

The purpose of East Art Map is to create an art history for Eastern Europe after 1945 by identifying modern artists, works, and projects which had a major impact on visual arts in the region.

So far the project's working art critics, historians, curators, and artists have identified over 250 artists to include in the project. Contributors in the artist selection process include representatives from Albania and Kosovo, Bosnia-Herzegovina, Bulgaria, Croatia, Czech Republic, East Germany, Estonia, Hungary, Latvia, Lithuania, Moldova, North Macedonia, Poland, Romania, Russia, Serbia and Montenegro, Slovakia, and Slovenia.

The EAM aims to be a democratized model that does not impose a singular narrative and invites data, and contributions from the public. The project aims to create a referential history in which artists can be connected by their tactics and qualities.

The European Union’s Culture 2000 programme, the Slovenian Minister of Culture supported the first phase of the project.

== See also ==
- IRWIN. 2006. East Art Map: Contemporary Art and Eastern Europe. Afterall Books.
