= Roland Hahnebach =

Sport
- Sport: Kayaking
- Event: Folding kayak
Medal record
Men's slalom canoeing
Representing East Germany
World Championships
Gold medal – first place	1961 Hainsberg	Folding K-1 team
Silver medal – second place	1961 Hainsberg	Folding K-1

Roland Hahnebach is a retired East German slalom canoeist who competed in the early 1960s. He won two medals at the 1961 ICF Canoe Slalom World Championships in Hainsberg with a gold in the folding K-1 team event and a silver in the folding K-1 event.
