= Rowan Osborne =

Rowan Osborne may refer to:

- Rowan Osborne (canoeist)
- Rowan Osborne (rugby union)
