= The Conservation Game =

- Theatrical Release Poster
- Directed by: Michael Webber
- Produced by: Michael Webber
- Starring: Tim Harrison
- Cinematography: Michael Webber
- Production company: NightFly Entertainment
- Distributed by: Cargo Film & Releasing Peacock
- Release date: April 2021 (Santa Barbara International Film Festival)
- Running time: 107 minutes
- Country: United States
- Language: English

The Conservation Game is a 2021 American investigative documentary film directed by Michael Webber. Set against the backdrop of a heated national debate on captive big cats in America, the film follows the story of Tim Harrison, a retired police officer who makes a bombshell discovery while undercover at an exotic animal auction. The film exposes alleged connections between celebrity conservationists and the exotic animal trade, particularly focusing on the use of big cat cubs in television entertainment.

== Plot ==
The film follows retired Ohio police officer Tim Harrison as he makes a discovery while undercover at an exotic animal auction, suspecting that America's television celebrity conservationists may be secretly connected to the exotic pet trade. The documentary investigates what happens to so-called "ambassador animals" that appear with celebrity conservationists on morning and late-night talk shows.

The investigation focuses on exposing what the filmmaker characterizes as a systematic deception of the American public about the true nature and destination of animals used in television entertainment, particularly the practice of using young big cats as "ambassador animals" on television talk shows and their fate after these appearances.

== Production ==
The Conservation Game was the result of a three-year investigation by filmmaker Michael Webber and team, who also directed the documentary The Elephant in the Living Room. Webber was originally drawn to the subject by Tim Harrison's book on his experience with the exotic pet trade. The film was produced by NightFly Entertainment, with Webber maintaining strict verification standards, refusing to include anything in the film that could not be positively verified.

== Release ==
The film had its world premiere at the Santa Barbara International Film Festival in April 2021, where it won a Social Justice Award and Best Director Award. New York-based Cargo Film & Releasing acquired worldwide distribution rights before the premiere.

The film had a limited theatrical release, with special premieres in New York City, Los Angeles and Washington D.C., with the latter highlighting its political implications for animal welfare legislation.

The film secured extensive international distribution through Cargo Film & Releasing. Variety reported on the documentary's successful global sales, reflecting significant international interest in the film's investigative approach and subject matter. In the United States, the film was released on the streaming platform Peacock.

== Cultural context ==
=== Connection to Tiger King ===
The Conservation Game was produced concurrently with the period during which Tiger King was being made. The documentary features prominent involvement from Carole Baskin and Howard Baskin, who would later gain widespread recognition as central figures in Netflix's Tiger King series.

Upon release, the film entered a cultural landscape where public interest in big cat ownership had been heightened. However, unlike Tiger King, which was criticized for its sensational approach, The Conservation Game was recognized for addressing animal welfare issues with journalistic rigor. Carole Baskin actively promoted the film while being highly critical of Tiger King in contrast, preferring the documentary's substantive approach to ethical journalism.

=== Comparisons to other documentaries ===
Critics frequently compared The Conservation Game to influential animal welfare documentaries Blackfish (2013) and The Cove (2009), noting parallels in approach and potential impact. The documentary was characterized as having similar potential for impact on celebrity animal handlers as the landmark documentaries had on marine entertainment facilities. The film was subsequently recognized as one of the top animal and environmental documentaries of 2022.

== Allegations and controversy ==
The documentary's central thesis involves allegations that prominent television conservationists, particularly the Columbus Zoo, were connected to the exotic animal trade. The film suggests that animals used in television appearances as "ambassador animals" were not returned to accredited facilities as claimed, but instead vanished into the exotic pet trade.

The film's revelations prompted significant controversy within the animal entertainment industry, with national press coverage examining what was characterized as an unregulated trade in exotic animals. Celebrities declined to respond to requests for comment regarding the allegations.

== Reception ==
=== Critical response ===
The film received widespread critical attention, most of which was positive, and the film was described as having the potential to significantly change a mainstay of the entertainment industry forever. Critics praised the documentary's intensity and investigative approach, noting it as "an absolute dose of adrenaline" that managed to be "informative, truthful, and exciting without being sensational."

The documentary was noted for being an eye-opening, revelatory exposé that challenged widely held assumptions about celebrity conservationists while maintaining strict verification standards for all claims presented.

=== Awards and recognition ===
The Conservation Game won a Social Justice Award and Best Director Award at the Santa Barbara International Film Festival. The film was named as one of the top animal and environmental documentaries of 2022.

== Impact and consequences ==
=== Immediate aftermath ===
The timing of the announcement was noted by moviegoers and film critics as potentially connected to the documentary's revelations.

=== Columbus Zoo accreditation loss ===
Months after the film's release, the Columbus Zoo, lost its prestigious accreditation from the Association of Zoos and Aquariums (AZA). AZA president Dan Ashe, explained that issues revealed in the film influenced the decision to revoke Columbus' accreditation. The zoo's subsequent appeal was denied in December 2021, with an option to reapply in autumn 2022. The Columbus Zoo regained accreditation in March 2023, under new leadership by Tom Schmid. It also maintains accreditation by the Zoological Association of America, as of 2026.

=== Industry changes ===
Director Michael Webber noted that following the film's release, the practice of using endangered cubs on television shows appeared to have ceased, with big cats no longer appearing on talk shows since the documentary's release.

=== Exposure of celebrity conservationists ===
The Conservation Game focused critical attention on several prominent television personalities who regularly appeared on talk shows and morning programs with big cat cubs, including Dave Salmoni, Jarod Miller, and Boone Smith. The documentary alleged that these celebrity conservationists, who regularly brought "ambassador animals" to programs ranging from The Tonight Show Starring Jimmy Fallon to Good Morning America, were secretly connected to the exotic animal trade.

The film's central allegation was that animals used in television appearances did not originate from and were not taken to accredited facilities, as the public was told, but instead vanished into the exotic pet trade. Using hidden cameras at exotic animal auctions, Harrison and his team documented what they characterized as "high-profile, television conservationists actually participating in the auction" and "literally selling ambassador animals that were used on television and dumping them into the exotic pet trade." The investigation revealed what the filmmakers described as a systematic deception, with Harrison noting the "complete lack of caring or compassion shown by the celebrity conservationists when they were told that their ambassador animals were missing."

==== Impact on television appearances ====
Following the documentary's release, the decades-long practice of featuring big cats on television programs appeared to cease entirely. Director Michael Webber observed that "as soon as the film began screening, the decades-long practice of dragging endangered cubs onto television shows and deceiving the public into believing they are part of a conservation program appeared to suddenly cease." Webber further noted that "none of the self-proclaimed conservationists exposed in the film have appeared with an animal on television since."

==== Lack of response from implicated parties ====
Despite the serious allegations presented in the film, there was a notable absence of public response from the implicated celebrities and television networks. Harrison stated that "no television show hosts or producers have responded to me or my team's inquiries" regarding the film's findings. The film noted that they "declined to respond to requests for comment regarding the allegations." This silence extended to the broader entertainment industry, with no major television networks or celebrity conservationists mounting public defenses against the documentary's claims about their practices involving exotic animals. The Association of Zoos and Aquariums acknowledged the film's impact, with President Dan Ashe stating that the organization "unequivocally condemns the treatment of animals that is portrayed in 'The Conservation Game,'" noting that "the practices shown in the documentary do not reflect the letter or spirit of AZA standards."

=== Legislative impact ===
The film documented efforts to pass the Big Cat Public Safety Act, featuring longtime advocates Howard and Carole Baskin of Big Cat Rescue. The documentary exposed regulatory gaps in the exotic animal trade and its connection to television entertainment.

The Big Cat Public Safety Act was passed by Congress and signed into law on December 20, 2022, just a year after The Conservation Game's release. The legislation, which prohibits private ownership of big cats and bans direct public contact with the animals, gained momentum following the documentary's revelations about the exotic animal trade. Tim Harrison expressed confidence that "after the release of The Conservation Game, the Act will pass in the House and have a good shot making it through the Senate." Congressman Mike Quigley, a sponsor of the bill, stated his hope that the film would "educate the public and eventually lead to the passage of The Big Cat Public Safety Act." Animal welfare advocates noted that Harrison "fought for" the legislation throughout the documentary, which documented the congressional battle over the bill.
