= Tom McEwan (whitewater kayaker) =

Thomas Edmund McEwan (born March 3, 1946), known as Tom McEwan, is an American whitewater kayaker. He competed internationally on the US National Wildwater Team.

== Adventurer ==
McEwan is credited with numerous first descents including the Great Falls of the Potomac in 1975, as well as the 1973 descent of approximately 8 miles of Linville Gorge, with Jamie McEwan. He, Jamie McEwan, Andy Bridge and Wick Walker were the first to explore the Mexican whitewater on the Santa Maria in 1985.

In 1981 McEwan participated in an expedition to Bhutan with Wick Walker, Les Bechdel, Eric Evans, Jamie McEwan, with Ed Hixon in support, on the Wong Chu, Para Chu, Pho Chu, and Mo Chu.

In 1998, McEwan and his brother Jamie, Roger Zbel and Doug Gordon were the kayaking members of an expedition to run the Tsangpo Gorge, considered the "Mount Everest" of rivers. They were supported by Wick Walker, Harry and Doris Wetherbee, Paulo Castillo, and Dave Phillips. The expedition encountered unanticipated high water and ended in tragedy when teammate Doug Gordon capsized, missed his roll and died.

== Educator ==
McEwan has served in a variety of roles as a hands-on educator, leader, and director of various summer camps, most notably Valley Mill Camp in Germantown, MD. Tom started and ran Liquid Adventures Kayak School in Cabin John, MD until 2016. His former students include a number of accomplished kayakers, such as World Cup champion Andy Bridge, Olympic gold metalist Joe Jacobi, adventurer John Weld, and University of California full professor of river science Gregory Pasternack.

McEwan's teaching style was a blend of hands-on training and leading by example. During these trips, students would follow McEwan from eddy to eddy working down rapids, but also practice a variety of unique maneuvers. McEwan taught his students to work hard at times when others would rest. For example, many whitewater reaches end in reservoirs, but rather than drifting through them, McEwan set a challenging pace for teenagers a third of his age to try to keep up with. His paddling form was influenced by experience in wildwater kayaks, and he also trained students in these unusual forms of boats.

== Books about Tom McEwan ==
- Wickliffe Walker (2000). Courting the Diamond Sow : A Whitewater Expedition on Tibet's Forbidden River. National Geographic Society. ASIN B001TL2O5S.
- Todd Balf (2001). The Last River: The Tragic Race for Shangri-la . Three Rivers Press. ISBN 978-0-609-80801-6.
