= Jean Meichtry =

Swiss canoeist

Medal record

Men's canoe slalom

Representing Switzerland

World Championships
Bronze medal – third place	1961 Hainsberg	C-2 team

Jean Meichtry is a Swiss retired slalom canoeist who competed from the late 1950s to the early 1960s. He won a bronze medal in the C-2 team event at the 1961 ICF Canoe Slalom World Championships in Hainsberg.
