= Jiří Černý =

Personal information
- Born: 1945 (age 80–81)

Sport
- Sport: Kayaking
- Event: Folding kayak
Medal record
Men's slalom canoeing
Representing Czechoslovakia
World Championships
Silver medal – second place	1961 Hainsberg	Folding K-1 team
Bronze medal – third place	1961 Hainsberg	Folding K-1
Bronze medal – third place	1963 Spittal	Folding K-1

Jiří Černý is a retired Czechoslovak slalom canoeist who competed in the 1960s. He won three medals at the ICF Canoe Slalom World Championships with a silver (Folding K-1 team: 1961) and two bronzes (Folding K-1: 1961, 1963).
