= Karel Novák =

Czechoslovak canoeist

Medal record

Men's canoe slalom

Representing Czechoslovakia

World Championships
Gold medal – first place	1961 Hainsberg	Mixed C-2
Bronze medal – third place	1963 Spittal	Mixed C-2

Karel Novák is a retired Czechoslovak slalom canoeist who competed in the early-to-mid 1960s. He won two medals in the mixed C-2 event at the ICF Canoe Slalom World Championships with a gold in 1961 and a bronze in 1963.
