= Bohuslav Pospíchal =

Medal record

Men's canoe slalom

Representing Czechoslovakia

World Championships
Gold medal – first place	1961 Hainsberg	C-1 team
Gold medal – first place	1965 Spittal	C-1 team
Gold medal – first place	1967 Lipno	C-1 team
Silver medal – second place	1961 Hainsberg	C-1

Bohuslav Pospíchal is a retired Czechoslovak slalom canoeist who competed from the late 1950s to the late 1960s. He won four medals at the ICF Canoe Slalom World Championships, with three golds (C-1 team: 1961, 1965, 1967) and a silver (C-1: 1961).
