= Canoeing at the 1972 Summer Olympics – Men's slalom C-1 =

These are the results of the men's C-1 slalom competition in canoeing at the 1972 Summer Olympics. The C-1 (canoe single) event is raced by one-man canoes through a whitewater course. The venue for the 1972 Olympic competition was in Augsburg.

== Medalists ==
Gold	Silver	Bronze
Reinhard Eiben (GDR)	Reinhold Kauder (FRG)	Jamie McEwan (USA)

== Results ==
The 22 competitors each took two runs through the whitewater slalom course on August 28. The best time of the two runs counted for the event.

Rank	Name	Run 1			Run 2			Result
Rank	Name	Time	Points	Total	Time	Points	Total	Total
Gold	Reinhard Eiben (GDR)	277.50	50	327.50	285.84	30	315.84	315.84
Silver	Reinhold Kauder (FRG)	307.89	20	327.89	320.31	30	350.31	327.89
Bronze	Jamie McEwan (USA)	331.52	90	421.52	295.95	40	335.95	335.95
4	Jochen Förster (GDR)	284.42	70	354.42	295.45	70	365.45	354.42
5	Wolfgang Peters (FRG)	-	-	-	286.25	70	356.25	356.25
6	Jürgen Köhler (GDR)	312.88	60	372.88	327.70	120	447.70	372.88
7	Karel Třešňák (TCH)	298.70	120	418.70	315.07	70	385.07	385.07
8	Petr Sodomka (TCH)	301.11	90	391.11	298.83	100	398.83	391.11
9	Zbyněk Puleč (TCH)	351.46	200	551.46	331.38	60	391.38	391.38
10	Angus Morrison (USA)	293.77	100	393.77	332.88	100	432.88	393.77
11	Wickliffe Walker (USA)	354.40	140	494.40	369.76	30	399.76	399.76
12	Michel Trenchant (FRA)	306.73	140	446.73	325.98	80	405.98	405.98
13	John Albert (GBR)	328.40	110	438.40	339.15	210	549.75	438.40
14	Tone Hočevar (YUG)	403.41	250	653.41	365.40	80	445.40	445.40
15	Claude Baux (FRA)	348.69	150	498.69	323.16	140	463.16	463.16
16	Bernhard Heinemann (FRG)	328.10	170	498.10	377.41	90	467.41	467.41
17	Damjan Prelovšek (YUG)	323.85	160	483.85	346.11	200	546.11	483.85
18	François Bonnet (FRA)	336.17	190	526.17	351.23	210	561.23	526.17
19	William Griffith (CAN)	341.50	230	571.50	340.64	190	530.64	530.64
20	Rowan Osborne (GBR)	351.12	210	561.12	393.08	210	603.08	561.12
21	Geoffrey Dinsdale (GBR)	326.09	360	686.09	386.72	190	576.72	576.72
22	Edy Paul (SUI)	-	-	-	392.50	250	642.50	642.50
