= Jan Niemiec (canoeist) =

Polish canoeist

Personal information
- Born: 1941
- Died: 14 September 2017 (aged 76) Wołomin, Poland

Sport
- Sport: Kayaking
- Event: Folding kayak
Medal record
Men's canoe slalom
Representing Poland
World Championships
Bronze medal – third place	1961 Hainsberg	Folding K-1 team

Jan Niemiec (1941 – 14 September 2017) was a Polish slalom canoeist who competed in the 1960s. He won a bronze medal in the folding K-1 team event at the 1961 ICF Canoe Slalom World Championships in Hainsberg.

He died on September 14, 2017, in Wołomin, Poland in the age of 76.
