= IRWIN =

Collective of Slovenian artists

IRWIN is a collective of Slovenian artists, primarily painters, and an original founding member of Neue Slowenische Kunst (NSK).

== History ==
In 1983, the artists Dušan Mandič, Miran Mohar, Andrej Savski, Roman Uranjek, and Borut Vogelnik, coming from the punk and graffiti scene in Ljubljana, formed an artistic group and called it Rrose Irwin Sélavy. This name had a reference to Marcel Duchamp, who used “Rrose Sélavy” (like eros c’est la vie) as one of his feminine pseudonyms. The group would soon shorten the name to R Irwin S.

In 1984, the group co-founded a larger collective known as Neue Slowenische Kunst (NSK). Acting as the fine arts wing of the group, they joined the musical group Laibach, and the Scipion Nasice Sisters Theatre group. Soon after the formation of the larger collective, R Irwin S changed its name to simply Irwin.

In 1987, IRWIN, Novi Kolektivizem and Scipion Nasice Sisters Theatre were involved in one of the greatest art scandals in the history of Yugoslavia when they proposed a poster, based on a Nazi kunst poster, for the celebration of the Youth Day, Tito's birth anniversary. In the history of art, this scandal is known as the Poster Scandal. In 2012, D'Art documentaries production is to release a 1-hour documentary about the scandal, entitled "The Fine Art of Mirroring".

In August 2022, Uranjek died of suicide in Ljubljana at the age of 60. At time of his death he was connected to alleged sexual abuse and financial manipulation circle.

== Characteristics ==
Irwin’s work is defined largely by three main principles. The first is the idea of building one’s own artistic position out of one’s particular circumstances; by being particular, art can become truly universal. The second is working in a group, a collective, or even an organization, shifting the emphasis away from the individual personality of the artist. The third is the fundamental NSK working procedure sometimes called the retro-principle. The latter principle gives rise to the concept known as “retroavantgardism” (or, later “retrogardism”). As the name implies, retroavantgardism is somewhat paradoxical because it calls for simultaneously looking backward (“retro”) and forward (“avant-garde”). This position is evident in the paradoxical title of an official statement of the group in 1987, “The Future is the seed of the past.” In essence, retroavantgardism consists in the recycled use of past symbols, images and philosophical ideas, particularly those that have been used by governments or other institutions to accumulate and hold power.

Irwin is also very interested in the idea of the complexity of the image. For them, an image is never neutral, nor does it ever appear in a neutral space. Thus their work can be tied to the larger international inquiry known as Institutional Critique. Directly drawing upon images that have strong political and/or artistic connotations, including fascist, Soviet, religious, and Suprematist images, Irwin’s art is complex and has a traumatic and provocative effect. Reflecting their belief that there is no neutral space, Irwin’s work becomes increasingly concerned with location, both in performance pieces, but also in exhibitions. The self-curation of their shows becomes as much a part of the work, as the pieces themselves.

== Works ==
=== Paintings ===
Irwin’s “paintings” incorporate a number of media including paint, tar, books, dishes, Lego, silkscreens and many others. The works are not signed by the group, in a traditional sense, but are presented to the collective for approval. The work will then be stamped with the groups monogram—often on a metal plate.

=== Performance Pieces ===
Although primarily painters, they have engaged in many collaborative works with other NSK art collectives, ranging from theater to music video. In 1992, in cooperation with Michael Benson, they created the performance Black Square on Red Square, in which a square of black cloth, 22 meters to a side, was unfurled on Moscow's Red Square, in homage to Kazimir Malevich and suprematism. Others of their more notable activities have included the planning of the NSK Embassies and Consulates in Moscow, Gent and Florence, and the Transnacionala project—a journey from the east to the west coast of the United States in 1996.

=== East Art Map ===
East Art Map is a project to create a history and vocabulary for Eastern European art starting in 1945 by identifying and compiling a sourcebook of influential artists.

== Exhibitions ==
Irwin have exhibited widely in Europe and the USA, including Manifesta in Rotterdam and Ljubljana, Venice Biennial, After the Wall, and Aspects/Positions. In 2004, they have received the Jakopič Award, the highest annual award in Slovene fine arts.

== Books ==
- New Collectivism (1991). Neue Slowenische Kunst. AMOK Books and Neue Slowenische Kunst. ISBN 1-878923-05-6.
- IRWIN (2006). East Art Map. Afterall Books and The MIT Press. ISBN 1-84638-005-7.
- Cufer, Eda, ed. (1999). Transnacionala: Highway Collisions Between East and West at the Crossroads of Art. Studentska organizacija Univerze v Ljubljana, SOU. ISBN 961-6211-62-5.
- Cufer, Eda, ed. (1992). NSK Embassy Moscow: How the East Sees the East. Loza Gallery.
- Arns, Inke, ed. (2003). IrwinRetroprincip. Revolver. ISBN 3-936919-56-9.
