= Screen Studies Group, London =

Consortium of universities for film studies

Coordinates: 51°30′43.00″N 0°06′58.00″W

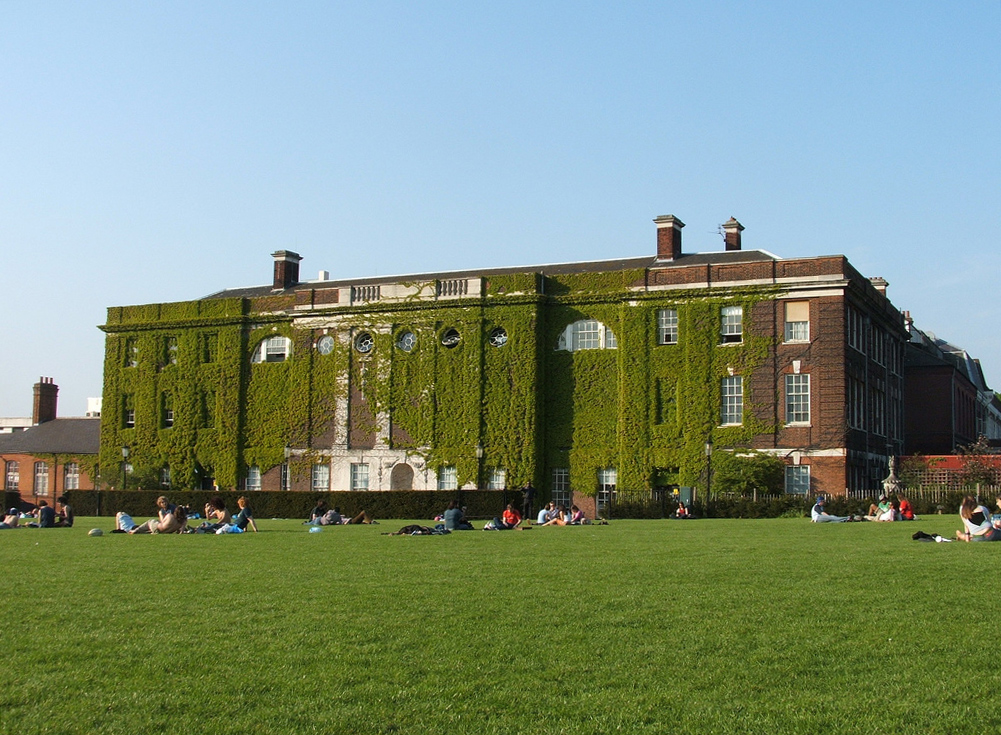
- Goldsmiths University
- Type: Consortium - research university
- Established: 2001
- Head: Rachel Moore
- Students: Undergraduates, postgraduates, PhD candidates
- Location: London, United Kingdom
- Campus: Urban
- Website: Screen Studies Group

The University of London Screen Studies Group (SSG) is a research consortium in film studies, founded in 2001. Member institutions include Goldsmiths, Birkbeck, University College London, King's College London, Royal Holloway, SOAS, Queen Mary, and the London School of Economics.
