= Mark Lewis (artist) =

Canadian artist, born 1958

- Born: 1958 (age 66–67); Hamilton, Ontario, Canada
- Known for: Installation artist
- Spouse: Janice Kerbel

Mark Lewis (born 1958) is a Canadian artist, best known for his film installations. He represented Canada at the 2009 Venice Biennale.

== Biography ==
Lewis attended the Harrow College of Art (London) and the Polytechnic of Central London. In the 1980s, he studied with Victor Burgin, and was a friend of Laura Mulvey in 1981. He began his career as a photographer and from 1989 to 1997 lived in Vancouver, becoming part of the burgeoning photoconceptualism scene of the Vancouver School. In 1991, he produced the documentary Disgraced Monuments with Mulvey. In the mid‑1990s, he began making film-based installations . His first art film was Two Impossible Films (1995). In 1999, he eliminated sound from his film. His work focuses on the technology of film and the different genres which have developed in over 100 years of film history: he makes films that are often short, precise exercises on particular techniques, particularly rear projection (he believes the invention of rear projection in late 1920s was when film became modern) and playing film backwards. In 2020, he told an interviewer:

The only real technical invention of the cinema is the ability to go backward.

In 2009, he represented Canada at the Venice Biennale in Italy in an exhibition curated by Barbara Fischer. He has had solo museum exhibitions at the Musée du Louvre, Paris (2014), The Power Plant, Toronto (2015), the Art Gallery of Ontario which organized Mark Lewis. Canada (2017), the Museo de Arte de São Paulo (MASP) (2020), and at numerous other international venues such as the National Museum of Contemporary Art (Bucharest, Romania) (2005), the Hamburger Kunstverein (2005), Musée d’art Moderne du Grande Duc, Jean (Luxembourg) (2006), BFI Southbank (London) (2007), and at the Van Abbemuseum, Eindhoven, Netherlands (2013). In 2022, a Mark Lewis Program was held by La Cinémathèque québécoise.

His work is in many collections including the National Gallery of Canada; Museum of Modern Art New York; Musée National d'Art Moderne, Paris; the Centre Pompidou (Paris), the Museo de Arte de São Paulo and the Musée d'art contemporain de Montréal, among others. In 2007, he received the Gershon Iskowitz Prize and the Brit Art Doc Foundation Award. In 2016, he received a Governor General's Award in Visual and Media Arts.

He lives and works in London, England which he moved to in 1997. He is Professor in Fine Art at Central Saint Martins, University of the Arts London and co-founder, co-director and co-editor of Afterall, a research and publishing project.
