= Zanesville animal escape =

2011 animal escape in Ohio

- Date: October 18, 2011; 14 years ago
- Location: Muskingum County, Ohio; 39.9466772°N 82.0625522°W
- Caused by: Suicide and release of animals by Terry Thompson

Parties
56 zoo animals	Muskingum County Sheriff's Office; Ohio State Highway Patrol

Casualties and losses
48 animals shot dead; 2 animals presumed eaten; 6 animals captured	

The Zanesville animal escape, also known as The Zanesville Massacre, occurred on October 18, 2011, when the owner of Muskingum County Animal Farm in Zanesville, Ohio, released multiple exotic animals before dying by suicide. The Muskingum County Sheriff's Office and Ohio State Highway Patrol subsequently killed 48 of the animals. Additionally, two were presumed eaten by the other animals, and six were captured and relocated to the Columbus Zoo and Aquarium. The event led to widespread media attention and legislative changes regarding exotic animal ownership in Ohio.

== Background ==
Muskingum County Animal Farm was a private zoo located in Zanesville, Ohio, United States owned by Terry Thompson, a 62-year-old Vietnam War veteran, pilot, and exotic animal collector. In 2005, Thompson was convicted of cruelty to animals, having an animal at large, and other charges after police found that four of his animals had died of starvation. He was sentenced to house arrest for six months.

He had acted as an animal handler on Wild Kingdom in 2008 and provided a lion cub to a photoshoot with Heidi Klum. In the years leading up to his death, he went to prison on federal firearm charges (for having an unregistered machine gun), was heavily in debt, and his wife had left him. The animal farm had been repeatedly reported for inadequate and unsafe housing for the animals, as well as insufficient water and food. Neighbors had previously complained of animals escaping "improper fencing" and causing damage to neighboring property.

== Animal escape ==
On October 18, 2011, owner Terry Thompson allegedly set free 50 of his 56 exotic animals before fatally shooting himself in the head. Lions, tigers, bears and wolves were among the animals that escaped and were hunted by local law enforcement, including the Muskingum County Sheriff's Office and Ohio State Highway Patrol, out of fear for public safety. The law enforcement did not use tranquilizers because they take time to take effect, and they must be tailored to an animal's size to be effective. Additionally, officers feared that animals shot with tranquilizers would run off and hide in the darkness once night fell.

Forty-eight animals were killed by the local police while two were presumed eaten by the other animals. The animals confirmed to be dead were eighteen Bengal tigers, six American black bears, two grizzly bears, two wolves, one macaque monkey, one baboon, three mountain lions, and seventeen African lions (nine males and eight females). Three leopards, a small grizzly bear, and two Celebes crested macaques were left caged inside Thompson's home. These animals were tranquilized and sent to the Columbus Zoo and Aquarium.

== Response ==
Jack Hanna, TV wildlife expert and Director Emeritus of the Columbus Zoo and Aquarium, lamented the killings but deemed the police actions necessary, saying that the animals would have likely killed people if tranquilizers had been used. Ohio governor John Kasich called for a temporary moratorium on the sale of exotic animals. Troy Balderson, Zanesville's representative in the Ohio Senate at the time, sponsored a bill requiring a permit and liability insurance for private owners of dangerous wild animals in the next legislative session. The bill was signed into law on June 5th, 2012, and owners were required to have permits by January 1st, 2014. Ohio had not regulated exotic animal ownership previously. Following the incident, media outlets and commentators noted that the 2010 documentary film The Elephant in the Living Room had essentially forecasted such a tragedy, highlighting the risks of exotic pet ownership in Ohio a year earlier.
