= Hočevar =

Hočevar is a Slovenian surname. Respellings include Hochevar (English) and Hotschewar (German-style). Notable people with the surname include:

== People ==
=== Hočevar ===
- Andrej Hočevar (born 1984), Slovenian ice hockey player
- Franc Hočevar (1853–1919), Austrian–Slovenian mathematician
- Matej Hočevar (born 1982), Slovenian ice hockey player
- Pavla Hočevar (1889–1972), Slovenian teacher, writer, socialist and suffragist
- Simon Hočevar (born 1974), Slovenian slalom canoer
- Stanislav Hočevar (born 1944), Roman Catholic archbishop of Belgrade
- Toussaint Hočevar (1927–1987), Slovenian American economic historian
- Tone Hočevar (born 1951), Yugoslav slalom canoer
- Zoran Hočevar (born 1944), Slovenian writer

=== Hocevar ===
- Carson Hocevar (born 2003), American dirt track and stock car racing driver
- Marcos Hocevar (born 1955), Brazilian tennis player
- Ricardo Hocevar (born 1985), Brazilian tennis player
- Sam Hocevar (born 1978), French software developer

=== Hochevar ===
- Brittany Hochevar (born 1981), American volleyball and beach volleyball player
- Luke Hochevar (born 1983), American baseball player
