= Rachel Moore (academic) =

American academic (born 1956)

- Born: April 21, 1956 (age 70); Chicago, Illinois, U.S.
- Occupation: Film studies academic
- Awards: Guggenheim Fellowship (1956)

Academic background
- Education: University of Michigan; New York University
- Thesis: Savage theory: Cinema as modern magic (1997)
- Doctoral advisor: William Simon

Academic work
- Discipline: Film studies
- Institutions: Goldsmiths, University of London

Rachel Olivia Moore (born April 21, 1956) is an American film studies academic. A 2001 Guggenheim Fellow, she is author of Savage Theory (2000), Hollis Frampton: Nostalgia (2006), and Performing Propaganda (2018), as well as co-editor of Public Space, Media Space (2013). She was a lecturer in international media at Goldsmiths, University of London.

== Biography ==
Rachel Olivia Moore was born on April 21, 1956, in Chicago, Illinois. She obtained her BA from the University of Michigan in 1982, before moving on to do graduate studies at New York University, where she got an MA in 1992 and PhD in 1997. Her doctoral dissertation Savage theory: Cinema as modern magic was supervised by William Simon.

As an academic, Moore specializes in early film and the avant-garde. In 2000, she published her book Savage Theory, focusing on the theme of magic in cinema. In 2001, she was awarded a Guggenheim Fellowship "for a study of folklore on film". She authored Afterall's 2006 book on Nostalgia: Hollis Frampton: Nostalgia. She was co-editor of Public Space, Media Space (2013), a volume on the impact of media saturation on public space. In 2018, she published another book, Performing Propaganda, focusing on the role of Parisian art music culture in World War I.

Despite working as an independent scholar in New York City, Moore has also held university positions. She worked at Goldsmiths, University of London Department of Media and Communications as a lecturer in international media and as a member of the Goldsmiths Leverhulme Media Research Centre, as well as chair of the University of London's Screen Studies Group and the MA degree program for film and screen studies. She was a visiting lecturer in art history at Birkbeck College, London.

== Bibliography ==
- Savage Theory (2000)
- Hollis Frampton: Nostalgia (2006)
- (co-edited with Chris Berry and Janet Harbord) Public Space, Media Space (2013)
- Performing Propaganda (2018)
