= Dragan Živadinov =

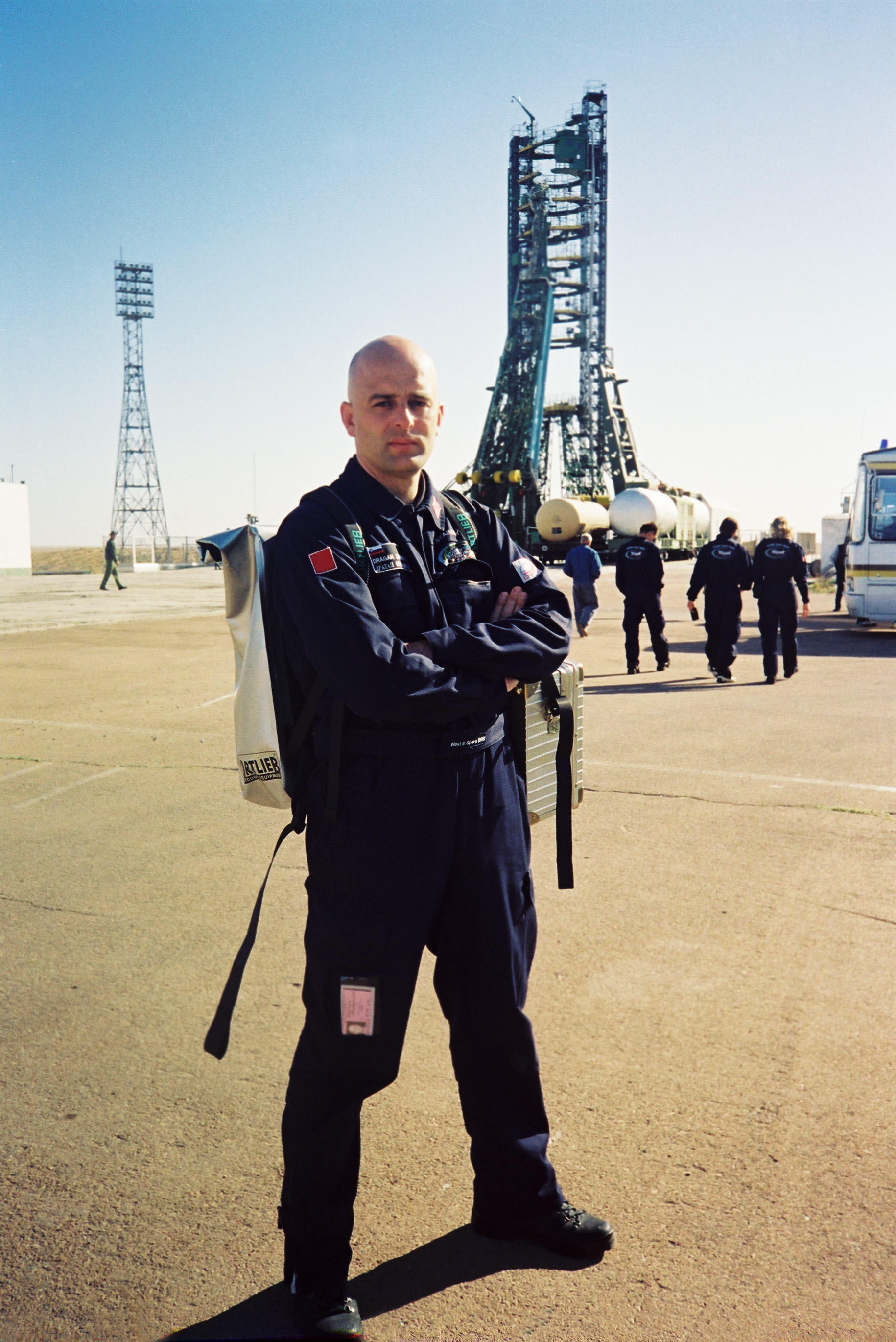
Dragan Živadinov at selection for a cosmonaut, Baikonur, Kazakhstan, 1998

Dragan Živadinov (born January 24, 1960, in Ilirska Bistrica) is a Slovenian theatre director.

== Biography ==
Živadinov studied theatrical direction at the Academy of Music, Radio, Television and Film in Ljubljana from 1980 to 1984. He was a co-founder of the art movement Neue Slowenische Kunst (1985). In the 1980s he constructed the style formation retro-gardism. In 1983 he founded the retro-garde Scipion Nasice Sisters Theatre and, in 1987, the cosmokinetic observatory Red Pilot. In the early 1990s he transformed Red Pilot into the Noordung Cosmokinetic Cabinet. In 1995 he embarked on the 50-year theatrical project Noordung 1995–2045 through the style formation of telecosmism.

In 1998 he became a candidate cosmonaut and, in 1999, realised Biomechanics Noordung, the first complete theatre production in zero gravity conditions.

== Selected theatrical productions ==
- Odilo, 2018
- Forbidden Theatre, 2008
- Biomechanics Noordung, 1999
- Noordung 1995–2045, 1995
- Baptism Under Triglav, 1986

== Selected theatre festivals ==
- Supremat, Helix, Dublin, 2004
- Noordung Prayer Machine, Kampnagel, Hamburg,1994
- Zenith, Theater der Welt, Essen, 1991

== Selected informances ==
- TRG, Brussels, 2006
- Helsey Gallery, Charleston, 2002
- Art Nouveau, Bologna, 1999
