= William Griffith (canoeist) =

Canadian canoeist

William "Bill" Griffith (born April 14, 1947 in Cobourg) is a Canadian retired slalom canoeist who competed in the 1970s. He finished 19th in the C-1 event at the 1972 Summer Olympics in Munich.
