= Reinhold Kauder =

Medal record

Men's canoe slalom

Representing West Germany

Olympic Games
Silver medal – second place	1972 Munich	C-1

World Championships
Gold medal – first place	1969 Bourg St.-Maurice	C-1 team
Gold medal – first place	1971 Meran	C-1
Silver medal – second place	1969 Bourg St.-Maurice	C-1
Silver medal – second place	1971 Meran	C-1 team

Reinhold Kauder (born 30 January 1950 in Bückeburg) is a former West German slalom canoeist who competed in the late 1960s and early 1970s. At the 1972 Summer Olympics in Munich, he won a silver medal in the C-1 event.

Kauder also won four medals at the ICF Canoe Slalom World Championships with two golds (C-1: 1971, C-1 team: 1969) and two silvers (C-1: 1969, C-1 team: 1971).
