= The Elephant in the Living Room (film) =

- Film poster
- Directed by: Michael Webber
- Produced by: Michael Webber
- Starring: Tim Harrison; Terry Brumfield
- Cinematography: Michael Webber
- Edited by: John T. Adkins; Barry O'Brien
- Music by: David Russo
- Production companies: NightFly Entertainment; MainSail Productions
- Distributed by: Warner Bros. National Geographic Wild; NightFly Entertainment; Level 33
- Release dates: February 11, 2010 (Santa Barbara); April 1, 2011
- Running time: 96 minutes
- Country: United States
- Language: English

The Elephant in the Living Room is an American documentary film directed by Michael Webber. The film explores the controversial American subculture breeding and selling exotic pets, with a focus on the practice of raising dangerous wild animals such as lions, tigers, elephants, bears, and venomous snakes as household pets.

== Plot ==
The documentary chronicles the stories of two men at the heart of the exotic pet debate. The first subject is Tim Harrison, an Ohio police officer whose friend was killed by an exotic pet, leading him to dedicate his life to protecting both exotic animals and the public. The second is Terry Brumfield, a big-hearted man who struggles to raise two African lions that he loves like his own family. Set against the backdrop of a heated national debate about exotic pet ownership, the film examines the challenges faced by both the owners of exotic animals and the animals themselves, who are often kept in unnatural conditions, confined to cages, and living in what the film describes as dangerous domestic environments.

== Awards ==
- 2010 "Best Documentary" – Sedona International Film Festival
- 2010 "Best Documentary" – Burbank International Film Festival
- 2010 "Best Documentary" – Traverse City Film Festival
- 2011 "Best Documentary" – Genesis Award
- 2010 "Best Documentary" – The United Film Festivals (London)

== Box office and distribution ==
The film had a limited theatrical release in 80 cities in the United States. The movie was subsequently released by Netflix and the National Geographic Channel, bringing it to a wider television and streaming audience. It has also been made available on various other streaming platforms including Amazon Prime Video and Apple TV.

== Critical response ==
The film received largely positive reviews from film critics. The documentary was praised for its balanced approach to a controversial subject matter, with reviewers noting the director's ability to maintain objectivity while exploring the human elements of the exotic pet debate. Critics highlighted the film's informational value and emotional impact. The documentary was noted for presenting complex issues around exotic pet ownership without losing sight of the subjects' humanity, while clearly illustrating the dangers posed by keeping wild animals as pets.

The film's technical execution and storytelling approach received recognition from high-profile industry figures. Academy Award-winning director Michael Moore praised the film as "One of the scariest, most entertaining and technically perfect films." The documentary received positive reviews from major critics and publications for its balanced yet compelling examination of the exotic pet trade.

Reviews emphasized Webber's nuanced examination of the complex subject matter, with critics noting the director's deliberate approach of avoiding sensationalism.

== Criticism ==
The documentary faced criticism from some members of the exotic animal ownership community. REXANO (Responsible Exotic Animal Ownership), an advocacy group for exotic pet owners that was featured in the film, argued that the documentary presented a one-sided view of exotic pet ownership. The organization criticized the film for focusing on irresponsible owners like Terry Brumfield while not adequately showcasing responsible exotic animal ownership, stating that "Terry was a horrible choice for the exotic animal community in general, as it painted us as weak, irresponsible people."

== Cultural impact ==
The film has been credited with raising awareness about the exotic pet trade in the United States and contributing to ongoing discussions about animal welfare and public safety. It has been used as an educational tool by animal welfare organizations and has influenced public discourse on exotic pet ownership legislation.

=== Exotic animal auctions ===
The documentary featured extensive undercover filming at exotic animal auctions and trade shows that were typically closed to media scrutiny. Webber and Tim Harrison obtained footage from events including the Mt. Hope, Ohio auction, described as a location where "they don't want anyone to see what's happening" and where "you can't photograph at all or bring a camera inside." The filmmakers described these venues as having "the tense, paranoid aura of a gun show, a legal world that fears regulation and exposure."

The undercover footage captured children purchasing dangerous animals such as crocodiles and venomous snakes, providing what the filmmakers described as "unprecedented access into a world rarely seen." At one reptile show, Harrison purchased a Puff Adder, described as "one of the most dangerous and most venomous snakes in the world," which was sold in a Tupperware container marked with red tape. The film showed how extremely dangerous animals, including those found exclusively in Africa, could be easily purchased by the general public at these events.

According to one review, as a result of the documentary's exposure, "The auction's website now warns potential pet owners that certain exotic animals will no longer be for sale, and one can presume it may be as a result of Tim and Michael's undercover camera." The film's investigation revealed what director Michael Webber described as a "multibillion-dollar industry" that operates with minimal oversight in many states.

=== Connection to Zanesville Animal Massacre ===
The documentary gained renewed attention and was viewed as prescient following the Zanesville Animal Massacre that occurred on October 19, 2011, just months after the film's national release. In this incident, Terry Thompson, an exotic animal owner in Zanesville, Ohio, released 56 lions, tigers, bears, and other dangerous animals before taking his own life, forcing law enforcement to kill most of the animals to protect public safety.

Many observers noted the tragic parallels between the documentary's warnings about inadequate regulation of exotic pet ownership and the Zanesville incident. The film's focus on Ohio's weak exotic animal laws and its portrayal of similar scenarios involving escaped big cats was seen as having presaged the disaster. Following the Zanesville tragedy, the documentary was frequently cited in discussions about the need for stricter exotic animal legislation, and Ohio subsequently passed the Dangerous Wild Animal Act in 2012.

== Animal welfare organization response ==
The documentary received significant praise from major animal welfare organizations. The Humane Society of the United States (HSUS) awarded it the 2011 Genesis Award for Outstanding Feature Documentary at their 25th Anniversary Genesis Awards ceremony.

The International Fund for Animal Welfare (IFAW) noted the film in their advancement of the Big Cat Public Safety Act and its value in educating Americans about the dangers of exotic pet ownership. The organization highlighted how the film captured law enforcement expert Tim Harrison's experiences dealing with exotic pets and the serious risks faced by emergency responders. The Animal Welfare Institute featured the documentary in their quarterly publication, conducting an interview with director Michael Webber. The publication emphasized the documentary's role in exposing the widespread nature of exotic pet ownership in the United States.

Exotic animal sanctuaries, such as Big Cat Rescue, founded by Carole Baskin and Howard Baskin " embraced the documentary as a powerful tool for their advocacy efforts. Director Michael Webber was subsequently invited to serve as the keynote speaker for the Big Cat Sanctuary Alliance, a speaking engagement that highlighted Webber's emergence as a leading voice in exotic animal advocacy space. The Baskin's would later collaborate with Webber on his follow-up documentary "The Conservation Game" (2021), demonstrating their lasting professional relationship and shared advocacy goals that developed from "The Elephant in the Living Room."

The Wild Animal Sanctuary in Colorado, which provided the final placement for Terry Brumfield's lions in the documentary, exemplified how legitimate sanctuaries serve as crucial safety nets for animals removed from inappropriate private ownership situations.

== See also ==
- Animal welfare
- Wildlife conservation
- List of documentaries
