= John Albert (canoeist) =

British slalom canoeist (born 1949)

John Stephen Albert (born 25 August 1949) is a British retired slalom canoeist who competed from the late 1960s to the mid-1970s. He finished 13th in the C-1 event at the 1972 Summer Olympics in Munich.
