= Tone Hočevar =

Yugoslav slalom canoeist (born 1951)

Antun "Tone" Hočevar (born 4 April 1951 in Ljubljana) is a Yugoslav retired slalom canoeist who competed from the late 1960s to the mid-1970s. He finished 14th in the C-1 event at the 1972 Summer Olympics in Munich.

His son, Simon Hočevar, and granddaughter, Eva Alina Hočevar, are also both Olympic canoeists.

In 2024, he received the Marjan Rožanc Award, the highest honor in the city of Ljubljana, for his contributions to sports.
