= Petr Baumruk =

Czech handball player

Personal information
- Nationality: Czech (Czechoslovakia)
- Born: 25 July 1962 (age 64) Ostrava, Czechoslovakia
- Height: 194 cm (76 in)

Sport
- Sport: Handball
National team
- Years: Team
- –: Czechoslovakia

Petr Baumruk (born 25 July 1962 in Ústí nad Labem) is a Czech former handball player who competed in the 1988 Summer Olympics and in the 1992 Summer Olympics representing Czechoslovakia.
