= Jamie McEwan =

Canoe racer (1952-2014)

Medal record

Men's canoe slalom

Representing United States

Olympic Games
Bronze medal – third place	1972 Munich	C1

World Championships
Silver medal – second place	1987 Bourg St.-Maurice	C2

James Patrick McEwan (September 24, 1952 – June 14, 2014) was an American slalom canoeist who competed in the 1970s and then again in the 1980s and early 1990s. He teamed up with his son Devin to compete in the 2000s. Competing in two Summer Olympics, he won a bronze medal in the C1 event at Munich in 1972.

McEwan was born in Olney, Maryland and began kayaking at his family's Valley Mill Camp. He earned a degree in literature from Yale University in 1975. He was married to children's author and illustrator Sandra Boynton, a fellow Yale graduate (class of 1974).

With his partner, Lecky Haller, McEwan won a silver medal in the C2 slalom at the 1987 ICF Canoe Slalom World Championships in Bourg St.-Maurice. He and Haller placed fourth in the 1992 Summer Olympics. They have also won the overall World Cup title in the C2 category in the inaugural season of this competition in 1988.

In 1998 McEwan and his brother Tom were members of an expedition to run the Tsangpo Gorge, considered the "Mount Everest" of rivers. The expedition encountered unanticipated high water and ended in tragedy when teammate Doug Gordon failed to boof a waterfall, missed his roll, and died.

McEwan wrote many children's books. In 2009 he was diagnosed with Multiple myeloma after suffering back problems and died on June 14, 2014.

== World Cup individual podiums ==
Season	Date	Venue	Position	Event
1988	26 June 1988	Savage River	2nd	C2
1988	2 July 1988	Minden	1st	C2
1988	4 July 1988	South Bend	1st	C2
1989			2nd	C2
1989	15 Aug 1989	Augsburg	2nd	C2
1989	20 Aug 1989	Tacen	2nd	C2
1990	26 Aug 1990	Tacen	2nd	C2
1991	25 Aug 1991	Minden	2nd	C2
1992	20 Jun 1992	Bourg St.-Maurice	2nd	C2

== Bibliography ==
- Jamie McEwan and Sandra Boynton (1988). Story of Grump and Pout. Knopf Books for Young Readers. ISBN 978-0-517-56706-7.
- Jamie McEwan and Victor Kennedy (2004). Willy the Scrub. Darby Creek Publishing. ISBN 978-1-58196-010-5.
- Jamie McEwan and John Margeson (2005). Whitewater Scrubs. Darby Creek Publishing. ISBN 978-1-58196-038-9.
- Jamie McEwan and Victor Kennedy (2007). Rufus the Scrub Does Not Wear a Tutu. Darby Creek Publishing. ISBN 978-1-58196-010-5.
- Jamie McEwan and Sandra Boynton (2002). The Heart Of Cool. Simon Spotlight. ISBN 978-0-689-82178-3.
- Jamie McEwan and Victor Kennedy (2004). Willy the Scrub. Darby Creek Publishing. ISBN 978-1-58196-010-5.
- Jamie McEwan and John Margeson (2008). Scrubs Forever!. Darby Creek Publishing. ASIN B001TL2O5S.

== Books about James McEwan ==
- Wickliffe Walker (2000). Courting the Diamond Sow : A Whitewater Expedition on Tibet's Forbidden River. National Geographic Society. ASIN B001TL2O5S.
- Todd Balf (2001). The Last River: The Tragic Race for Shangri-la . Three Rivers Press. ISBN 978-0-609-80801-6.
