= Damjan Prelovšek =

Slovenian art historian and diplomat (born 1945)

- Born: 18 February 1945 (age 81)
- Education: University of Ljubljana
- Occupation: Historian
- Awards: "Patriae et orbi: Studies on Central European Art: Jubilee Collection for Damjan Prelovšek" (2015); World Master (2016)

Damjan Prelovšek (born 18 February 1945 in Ljubljana) is a Slovenian art historian, and an expert on the architect Jože Plečnik. He was the Slovenian ambassador for Prague from 1998 to 2003.

== Early life ==
Prelovšek studied art history at the Faculty of Arts in Ljubljana, where he graduated in 1969 and received his doctorate in 1977 with a dissertation on the Slovenian architect Plečnik in Vienna.

== Cultural career ==
From 1971 onwards, he worked at the Institute of Art History of the ZRC SAZU and was appointed Director of the Institute in 1995. His publications were mainly about the Slovenian architect Jožet Plečnik, his life and work. He collected extensive documentary and photographic material on the architect.

He also prepared exhibitions on the creative work of Plečnik.

From 1998 to 2002 he was Ambassador of the Republic of Slovenia to the Czech Republic. Since 2006 he has been Director of the Department of Cultural Heritage at the Slovenian Ministry of Culture.

For four years, from 1998 to 2002, he was Slovenian ambassador in Prague.

He is a member of the European Academy of Sciences and Arts.

== Academic career ==
He was a visiting professor at the University of Salzburg in 1990, 1991 and 1996.

== Athletic career ==
From the mid-1960s to the early 1970s, he competed as a Yugoslav slalom canoeist. He finished 17th in the C-1 event at the 1972 Summer Olympics in Munich.

== Awards ==
In 2015, the France Stelet Institute of Art History dedicated to him the extensive multilingual collection “Patriae et orbi: Studies on Central European Art: Jubilee Collection for Damjan Prelovšek”.

The World Masters Committee in Korea presented the World Master to Prelovsek at the Hanguk University of Foreign Studies in Yongin on 26 September 2016.
