= Scipion Nasice Sisters Theatre =

The Scipion Nasice Sisters Theatre (Slovene: Gledališče sester Scipion Nasice) was founded on 13 October 1983 in Ljubljana by Eda Čufer, Dragan Živadinov and Miran Mohar, three Slovenian students.

The founders also wrote a manifesto ("The Sister Letter"), setting this theatre group a time frame of operation—four years—and described its stages from formation to self-destruction. The name refers to Publius Cornelius Scipio Nasica Corculum, a Roman Republican politician who passed a decree in 151 BC ordering the destruction of the first Roman theatre.

The Scipion Nasice Sisters Theatre (1983–1987) constituted—along with Laibach and IRWIN groups—one of the three pillars of the Neue Slowenische Kunst retrograde movement. Within the retrograde movement, theatre research engaged in the relation between religion, art and state. It focused on rituals and the function of spectacle in theatre and in the function of spectacle the state.

The retrograde production of events, as it was announced in the manifesto (The Sister Letter), incorporated an external manifestative part (actions) and an internal creative part (operations). The external part consisted of The Appearance (1983), The Resurrection (1984) and The Self-Destruction (1987); the internal part consisted of three stages of transformation: The Illegality (1984), The Exorcism (1985) and The Retro-Classic (1986).

In 1987, the Scipion Nasice Sisters Theatre performed self-destruction.

== External actions of the Scipion Nasice Sisters Theatre ==
- 1983 – The Sister Letter, Yugoslavia
- 1984 – The Resurrection, Ljubljana (ŠKUC Gallery)
- 1986 – The Self-Destruction Act, Belgrade (BITEF Festival)
- 1987 – The Self-Destruction, Bohinj – Belgrade – Ljubljana

== Internal operations of the Scipion Nasice Sisters Theatre ==
- 1984 – Hinkemann, The Retrogarde Event, 56 Tito Street (Titova cesta 56), Ljubljana
- 1985 – Maria Nablotska, The Retrogarde Event, 17 Town Square (Mestni trg 17), Ljubljana
- 1986 – Baptism Under Triglav, The Retrogarde Event, 10 Prešeren Street (Prešernova cesta 10), Ljubljana
- 1987 – The Self-Destruction / Day of Youth, The Art Event, Bohinj - Belgrade

== Bibliography ==
- Jones Irwin, Helena Motoh, Žižek and his Contemporaries: On the Emergence of the Slovenian Lacan, London, Bloomsbury, 2014.
- Katja Praznik, "Ideological Subversion vs. Cultural Policy of Late Socialism: The Case of the Scipion Nasice Sisters Theatre (SNST)" in Zdenka Badovinac, Eda Čufer, Anthony Gardner (editors), NSK from Kapital to Capital, Neue Slowenische Kunst—an Event of the Final Decade of Yugoslavia, MIT Press, 2015, pp. 355–365.
- James K. Tan, "The Ambitions of Scipio Nasica and the Destruction of the Stone Theatre", Antichthon, vol. 50 (Nov. 2016), pp. 70–79.
