= Michael Benson (filmmaker) =

American author, artist, filmmaker

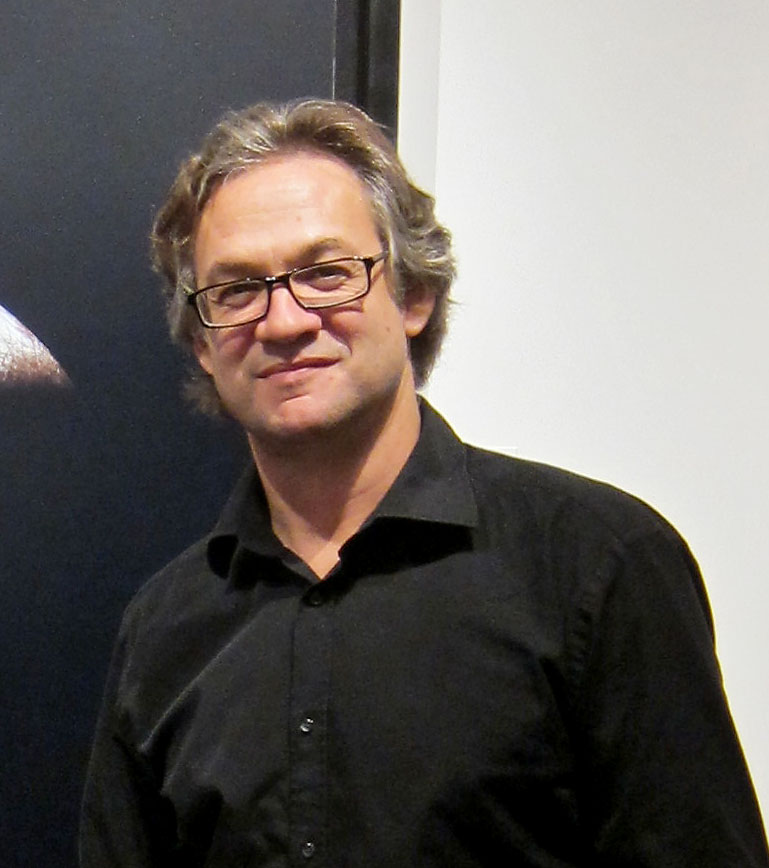
- Born: March 31, 1962 (age 64)
- Occupations: Author, artist, filmmaker, exhibitions producer
- Years active: 1985 – present
- Known for: Nanocosmos (book, 2025); Space Odyssey (book, 2018); Cosmigraphics (book, 2014); Far Out (book, 2009); Beyond (book, 2003); Predictions of Fire (feature documentary film, 1995)
- Spouse: Melita Gabrič
- Children: 1
- Website: michael-benson.com

Michael Benson (born March 31, 1962), an author, artist, and filmmaker, has pursued a wide-ranging creative practice. His work spans a range of media, from large-format photographic prints to nonfiction books and essays, illustrated books, films and visual-effects sequences. Following an influential period of engagement with the avant-gardes of the Soviet Union and former Yugoslavia, captured in feature articles for Rolling Stone magazine and his award-winning feature-length documentary film Predictions of Fire (1995), Benson turned his attention to the intersection of art and science in the 2000s.

During the last two decades Benson has produced a series of large-scale exhibitions of digitally constructed planetary landscapes in major international museums. He has also had a series of solo shows in commercial galleries in New York and London. His most recent book, Nanocosmos (Abrams, 2025) constitutes an investigation of natural design at microscopic scales using SEM (scanning electron microscope) technologies. Nanocosmos, which was produced at the Canadian Museum of Nature in Ottawa, was described as "both a journey into infinitesimal landscapes on Earth and a meditation on how humans visually explore and represent the physical world" by Katie Neith in Nautilus magazine. His previous book, Space Odyssey (Simon & Schuster, 2018), is a detailed nonfiction examination of the production of Stanley Kubrick's 2001: A Space Odyssey. The book's publication was timed to coincide with the 50th anniversary of the film's theatrical release. Benson's book Cosmigraphics (Abrams, 2014) surveyed four thousand years of human attempts to depict the universe with graphic images, and received widespread acclaim. Cosmigraphics went into print in five languages and was a finalist for a Los Angeles Times Book Prize at the 2014 Los Angeles Times Festival of Books.

Starting in 2018, Benson became increasingly involved in an international lunar time capsule project, Sanctuary. The project intends to land an archive of 24 synthetic sapphire discs containing a vast selection curated from human endeavors in science, art, architecture, literature, and other fields of activity onto the lunar surface. In 2020 he was instrumental in bringing the Sanctuary project to NASA, where it was eventually accepted as cargo for a lunar landing mission under the space agency's Commercial Lunar Payload Services program. As of 2025 the Sanctuary time capsule was assigned to a NASA lunar mission, and is expected to land on the Moon before the end of the decade.

Benson has written for The New York Times, The Washington Post, The New Yorker, The Atlantic, and Rolling Stone. He is a Fellow of the New York Institute of the Humanities and was recently a Visiting Scholar at the Center for Bits and Atoms at the MIT Media Lab.

== Career ==
=== Journalism ===
After receiving degrees in English and photography at the State University of New York at Albany in 1984, Benson worked as a news assistant and occasional contributor to The New York Times, but he left the paper after two years to pursue a career as a freelance journalist. In 1986, he began a series of articles for Rolling Stone covering the opening of the Soviet underground rock music scene during the so-called glasnost ("openness") period, which were published either with his own photographs or with images by noted rock photographer Anton Corbijn. Also in the mid-1980s, he wrote an hour-long documentary for MTV on Russian rock titled Tell Tchaikovsky the News. During this period, Benson worked occasionally as a photojournalist for the Reuters news agency's Moscow bureau, landing front page shots in The International Herald Tribune among other publications.

As a writer, Benson subsequently contributed articles on a diversity of topics to such magazines as The New Yorker, The Atlantic, Smithsonian, Artforum, The Nation, Interview, and Rolling Stone, as well as such newspapers as The New York Times, The Washington Post, and The International Herald Tribune, including many editorials. His 2003 "Annals of Science" feature for The New Yorker on NASA's mission to Jupiter, "What Galileo Saw", was selected for inclusion in the anthology The Best American Science Writing 2004 and subsequently in 2010, in The Best of Best American Science Writing (both Ecco/HarperCollins). His July 13, 2008 Washington Post weekend Outlook section piece titled "Send it Somewhere Special" advocated retrofitting the International Space Station to convert it into an interplanetary spacecraft. Clearly prompted by irritation that crewed spaceflight had been confined to low Earth orbit for almost forty years, the article proved to be controversial, and prompted heated reactions, with many dismissing Benson's ideas as impractical while others supported the concept.

In a previous op-ed, this one titled “Can the Heavens Wait?” and published by The New York Times on January 31, 2004, Benson criticized NASA for its decision, announced only days previously, not to service the Hubble Space Telescope. He advocated the immediate reinstatement of a Space Shuttle servicing mission, calling Hubble "surely the most important instrument in modern astronomy." After a sustained campaign by many astronomers, engineers, science writers, editorialists, and representatives of the science-literate public, a Space Shuttle mission to service the Hubble was in fact eventually reinstated. That mission, STS-125, took place in May 2009 and restored the space telescope for service until today.

More recently, Benson contributed a multi-media editorial to the Sunday Review section of The New York Times in December 2020. Titled "Watching Earth Burn," it used still images, video clips crafted from satellite images, and textual accompaniment to drive home the fact that many disturbing signs of climate change can be seen clearly from Earth's orbit, including continent-wide smoke palls from wildfires, superstorms, and dense layers of smog obscuring the view of significant parts of India and China. The article remained on the paper's "Most Emailed" list for two days.

=== Art and exhibitions ===
By the late-1990s, Benson had begun using the internet to harvest raw image data from deep space missions. It was a procedure he wrote about for The Atlantic Monthly magazine in an article titled "A Space in Time" in 2002, which eventually led to a contract with Harry N. Abrams, the New York publisher of illustrated books.

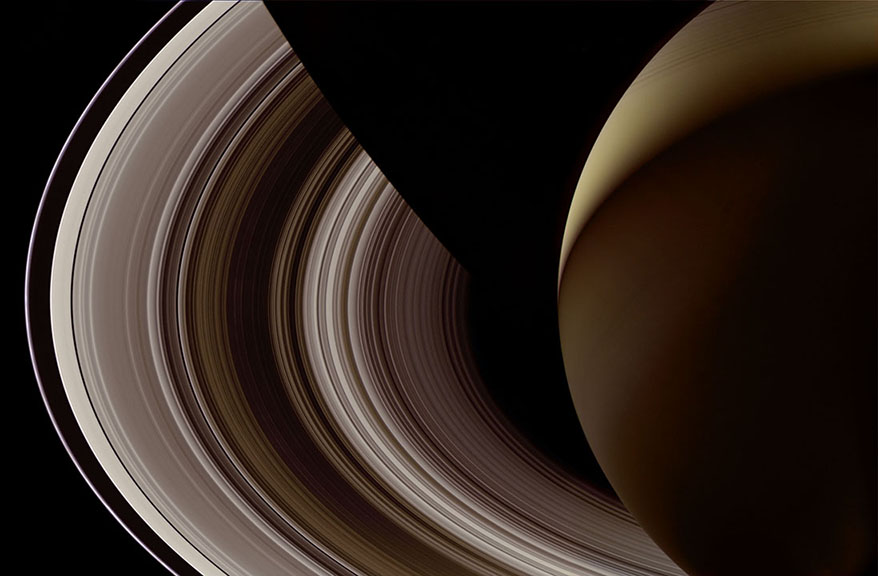
Night Side of Saturn, Cassini, October 28, 2006, (2011) Mosaic Composite by Benson

In discussing his work reprocessing raw image data from planetary science archives to produce composite landscapes, Benson has said that he is working to show that "the visual legacy of more than 50 years of interplanetary exploration constitutes a significant new chapter in the history of photography." On May 26, 2010, the largest-scale Beyond exhibition opened in the Art Gallery of the Smithsonian Institution's National Air and Space Museum in Washington, D.C. Featuring 148 prints spread across seven rooms, Beyond: Visions of Our Solar System was the largest collection of planetary landscape photography ever assembled in one place. The exhibition, which ran for a year, was described as "amazing" by The Washington Post. However, reviewer Blake Gopnik also expressed some reservations about the show. "Maybe my problem is that the space flight, the science, the getting-there and getting-the-shot are missing from these photos," he wrote. "These photographs are gorgeous, and the worlds they show are wondrous. But I miss the scientists' grid-marks, the fractures in their panoramas, the artifacts of their filters, that might hint at how these strange worlds came to be before my eyes. My eyes see too much evident art in these photographs for my mind not to imagine that there's tons of artifice behind them."

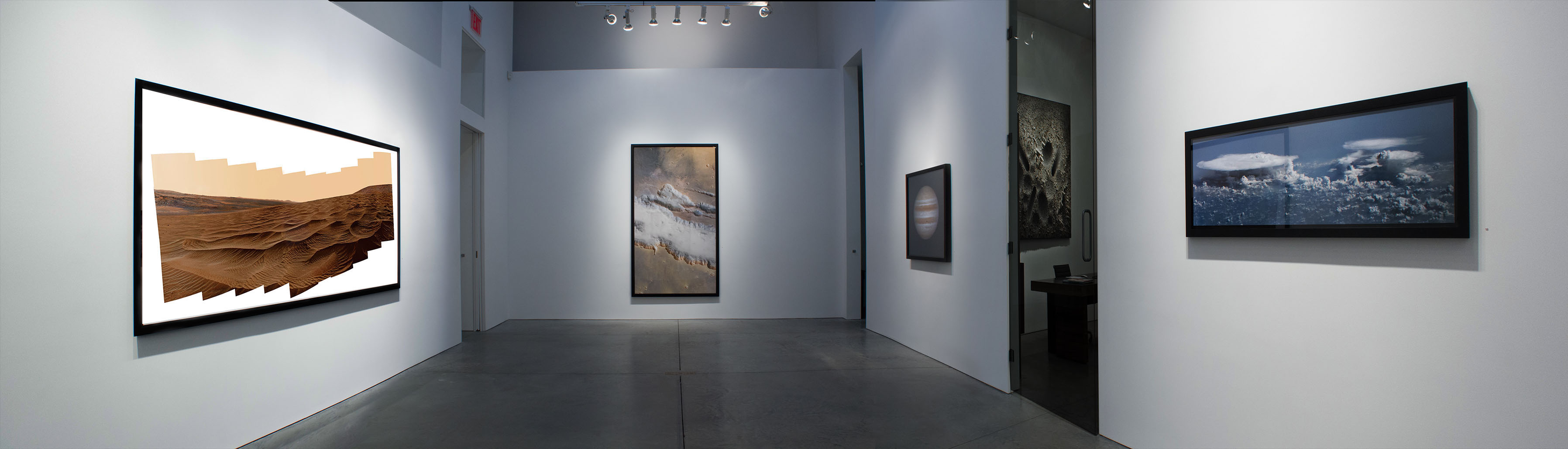
Benson's second solo show at Hasted-Kraeutler Gallery, West 24th Street, NYC, in 2013

In the fall of 2010, Benson accepted an invitation to be represented by a New York gallery, Hasted Kraeutler on West 24th Street. He has since had two well-received solo shows in the gallery, which went out of business in 2015. Following his February–March 2011 show, photography critic Vicki Goldberg wrote that "Some of the most beautiful and important photographs ever taken turn out to be images of outer space... So it is with a shiver of awe that we view Michael Benson's large, digitally composed photographs based on pictures captured by robotic space probes." (ARTnews) Benson is now represented in the UK by London's Flowers Gallery and its managing director, Matthew Flowers.

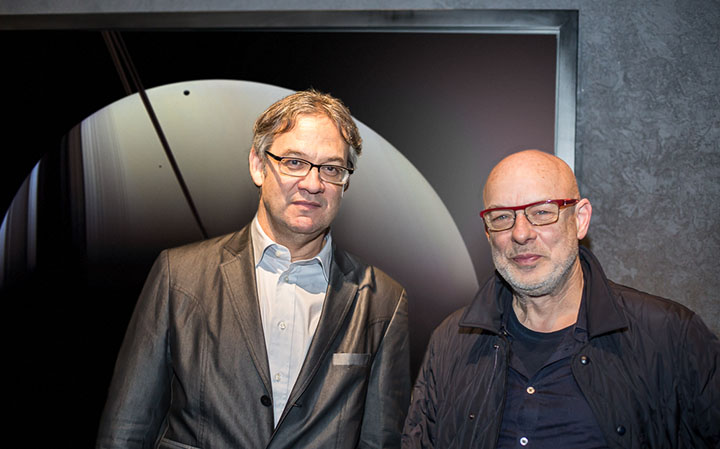
Benson and Brian Eno at the opening of "Otherworlds" at London's Natural History Museum, January 20th 2016

In January 2016, Benson's large exhibition of planetary landscapes, "Otherworlds: Visions of Our Solar System," opened in the Jerwood Gallery of the Natural History Museum in London. Featuring a new ambient composition by Brian Eno, the show featured 77 digital chromogenic prints of extraterrestrial vistas. After closing in London it moved to the Natural History Museum in Vienna and subsequently appeared in Australia, China, and Canada.

In 2020, the National Gallery of Canada acquired ten prints of Benson's planetary landscape work for their permanent collection.

=== Film ===
In 1989, Benson entered NYU Graduate Film School, which he followed in 1991 by moving to Slovenia, then still a republic of a rapidly imploding Yugoslavia, to make the feature documentary film Predictions of Fire (1995). He lived in Slovenia for 16 years, finally moving back to New York in the summer of 2007.

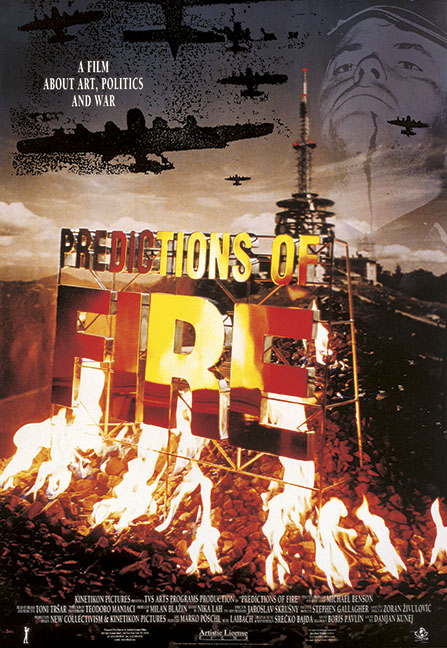
Predictions of Fire poster (1996)

Predictions of Fire premiered at the Sundance and Berlin International Film Festivals and won several best documentary awards internationally, including the National Film Board of Canada's Best Documentary Feature award at the 1996 Vancouver International Film Festival. The NFB jury released a statement with the award: "Predictions of Fire is intellectual dynamite. It explodes the icons and myths of communism and capitalism. Out of the shattered history of Slovenia, this film constructs a new way of looking at art, politics, and religion." Despite many good reviews, including in Variety and the LA Times, the film, which also played at New York's prestigious Film Forum art cinema, didn't escape criticism. In his review Stephen Holden of The New York Times said the film "throws out such a dense profusion of ideas that it sometimes loses track of itself."

Benson later finished the TV broadcast version of a feature-length global road movie titled More Places Forever, which was shown on the German-French channel ZDF/Arte in November 2008. The film, a co-production between ZDF/Arte, TV Slovenia, and Benson's production company Kinetikon Pictures, features a visit to Arthur C. Clarke in Sri Lanka, among many other scenes shot in locations as diverse as Mongolia, Korea, Hong Kong, the United States, and Slovenia.

From 2007 to 2010, Benson worked with director Terrence Malick to help produce space and cosmology sequences for Malick's The Tree of Life, which drew in part from Benson's book and exhibition projects. The film, which explored the origins of the universe and the beginning of life on Earth as well as its ultimate fate, won the Palme d'Or at the 2011 Cannes Film Festival. Benson's planetary and cosmological sequences subsequently featured in Malick's 2016 experimental documentary film Voyage of Time, which The New York Times critic A.O.Scott called a "fusion of digital imagery and photographic imagination that seems at once utterly natural and completely impossible."

Benson's extraterrestrial landscapes were also incorporated in Chilean documentary film director Patricio Guzmán's 2011 film Nostalgia for the Light, which presented similarities between astronomers researching deep cosmological time and the struggle of Chileans still searching for the remains of relatives executed during Augusto Pinochet's dictatorship."

=== Books ===
Benson's book Beyond: Visions of the Interplanetary Probes (Harry N. Abrams, 2003; paperback edition 2008; children's edition 2009), features about 300 highly reprocessed photographs of the planets and moons of the Solar System, as well as the sun. The book, which has an introduction by noted science fiction writer and space visionary Arthur C. Clarke and afterword by the award-winning American writer of non-fiction Lawrence Weschler, culled shots from five decades of space probe images and repurposed them, positioning them as a chapter in the history of photography and the landscape. It won First Prize for Design, Special Trade General Books Category at the 2004 New York Book Fair and was called "An aesthetic revelation… a spectacular melding of science and art…" (Los Angeles Times) and a "pioneering and magnificent collection of pictures… sublimely exhilarating…" (Booklist). Beyond was printed in English, French, German, Spanish, Japanese, and Korean.

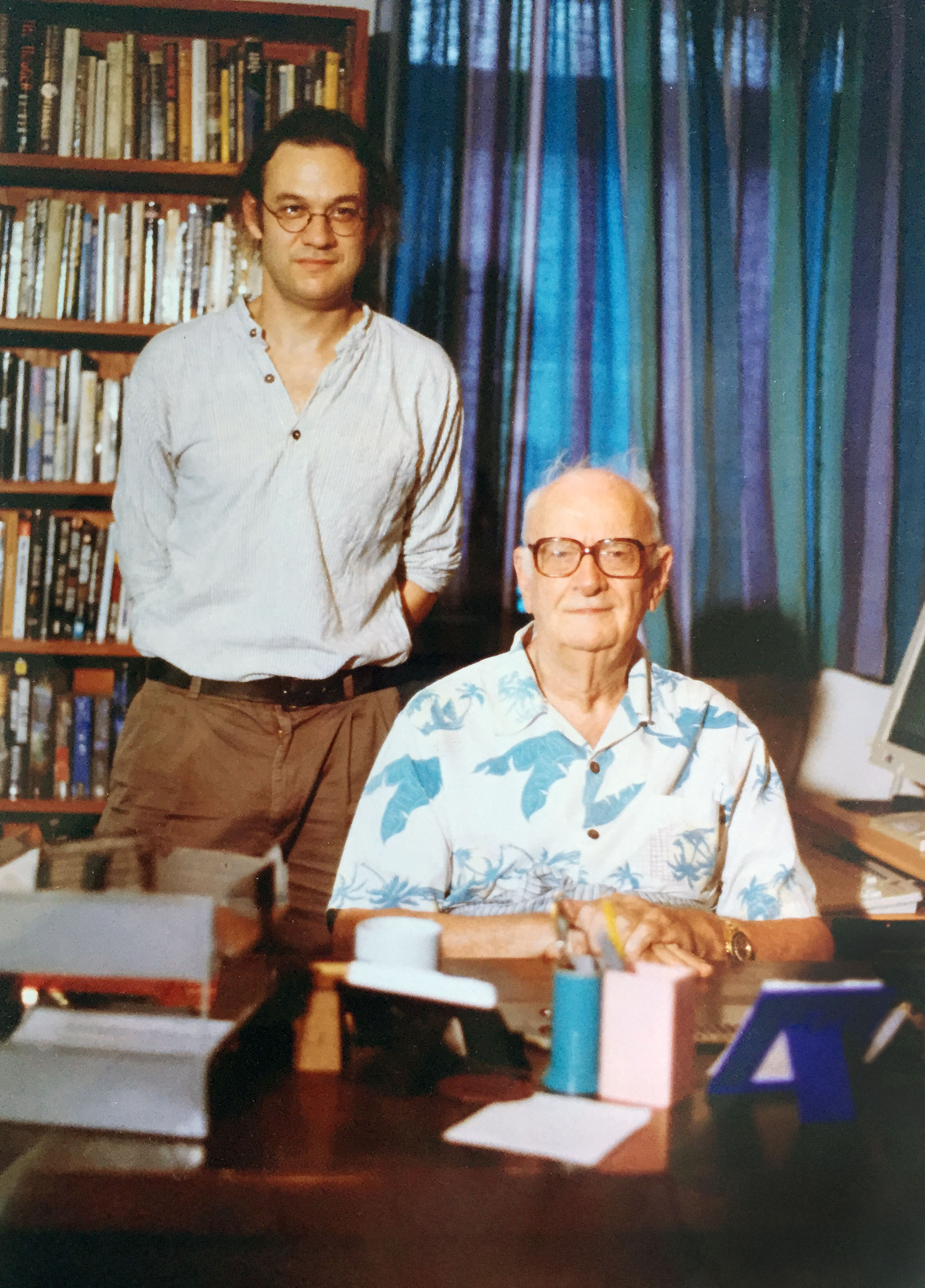
Benson with science fiction author and futurist Arthur C. Clarke in Sri Lanka in 2001. Clarke wrote the foreword to Benson's first book, Beyond.

From April 2007 to April 2008, an exhibition of large-scale photographic prints based on the book was displayed at the American Museum of Natural History in New York, and was described as a “stunning series of pictures” (The New York Times) and an “extraordinary exhibition” (New York). An exhibition of Beyond images was also toured around the United States by SITES, the Smithsonian Institution's Traveling Exhibitions Service, from 2008 to 2011.

Benson's second book, Far Out: A Space-Time Chronicle, was published by Abrams Books in October 2009. A companion volume to Beyond, Far Out covers such deep space phenomena as nebulae, star clusters, galaxies, and galaxy clusters. It also contains a series of short "sidebar" stories that trace various epochs of Earth history and link those periods to the main astronomical subjects of the books. These shorter stories are tied to the astronomical phenomena being depicted according to the light travel time between the Earth and the deep space objects in question. Reviewing the book for The New York Times, Dennis Overbye wrote "Actually 'exquisite' does not really do justice to the aesthetic and literary merits of the book, published in the fall... You can sit and look through this book for hours and never be bored by the shapes, colors and textures into which cosmic creation can arrange itself, or you can actually read the accompanying learned essays. Mr. Benson's prose is up to its visual surroundings, no mean feat."

Benson's third book, Planetfall: New Solar System Visions, came out in October 2012. German and Japanese editions were published in the fall of 2013. His fourth book for Abrams, Cosmigraphics: Picturing Space Through Time, received front-page coverage in "The New York Times" when it was released in October 2014. Cosmigraphics surveys 4,000 years of attempts to represent the universe graphically. In a rarity for an illustrated book, it was a finalist for a Book Prize in the Science and Technology category at the 2014 Los Angeles Times Festival of Books.

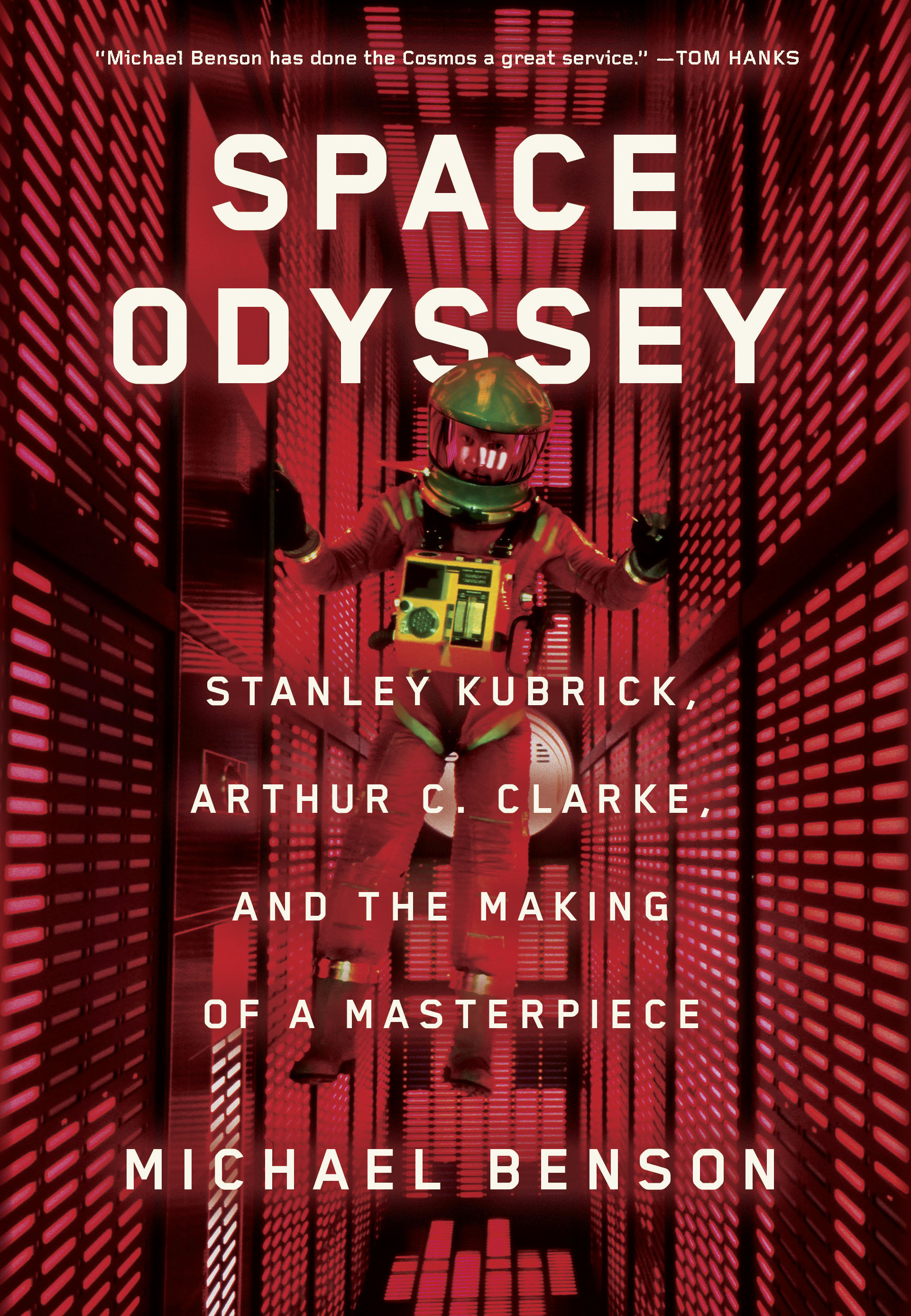
Cover of Benson's Space Odyssey, 2018.

In April 2018, the fiftieth anniversary of the release of Stanley Kubrick's 1968 film 2001: A Space Odyssey, Simon & Schuster published Benson's nonfiction book Space Odyssey: Stanley Kubrick, Arthur C. Clarke, and the Making of a Masterpiece. Currently in print in four languages, the book was hailed as "dense, intense, detailed, and authoritative" by Tom Hanks, and "lively, exciting, and exhaustively researched" by Martin Scorsese.

=== Current Work ===
Michael Benson completed six years of work using scanning electron microscope technologies at the Canadian Museum of Nature in Ottawa in 2024, and his book, Nanocosmos: Journeys in Electron Space (Abrams, 2025) was the latest result of this effort. In June 2023 he opened an initial visual sampling of this investigation into natural design at sub-millimeter scales in a museum exhibition at CosmoCaixa Barcelona. Nanocosmos toured Spain and Portugal for several years under the auspices of The Caixa foundation.
