= Rowan Osborne (canoeist) =

British canoeist

Rowan Osborne (born 17 September 1946) is a British retired slalom canoeist who competed in the early 1970s. He finished 20th in the C-1 event at the 1972 Summer Olympics in Munich.
