= Afterall =

UK nonprofit art research and publishing organisation

- Editor: Charles Esche, Mark Lewis
- Categories: Visual arts
- Frequency: two times per year
- Publisher: Central Saint Martins
- Founded: 1999
- Country: United Kingdom
- Based in: London
- Language: English
- Website: www.afterall.org
- ISSN: 1465-4253

Afterall is a nonprofit contemporary art research and publishing organisation. It is based in London, at Central Saint Martins. It publishes the journal Afterall; the book series Readers, One Works and Exhibition Histories.

== History ==
The journal Afterall was founded by curator Charles Esche and artist Mark Lewis in 1998 (issue 0 came out in 1999). Each issue focused on the work of four artists, presenting two in-depth essays for each artist. In 2006 Afterall incorporated AS (Andere Sinema), a journal previously published by MuHKA, the museum of contemporary art in Antwerp, which became a publishing partner. In 2009, the International University of Andalucia, Seville also became a publishing partner. The journal is published in partnership with M HKA, Antwerp; the John H. Daniels Faculty of Architecture, Landscape and Design, University of Toronto; NTU Centre for Contemporary Art Singapore; and in association with The University of Chicago Press. It was previously produced in association with California Institute of the Arts (2002–2009); Universidad Internacional de Andalucía arteypensamiento (2011–2014); the Smart Museum of Art and the Department of Visual Arts–Open Practice Committee, University of Chicago (2012–2015) and the Art Gallery of Ontario (2016–18).

In 2006, the journal widened its remit to include not only essays on artists themselves, but also contextual essays on the political, social, and economic issues that surround contemporary art, and retrospective looks at key artworks, events and exhibitions. Examples of these include an analysis of Laura Mulvey and Peter Wollen's Riddles of the Sphinx from 1977 ('What Does It Mean to Say Feminism Is Back? A Reaction to Riddles of the Sphinx, spring 2007) and Sandi Hilal, Alessandro Petti and Eyal Weizman's proposals for architecture in Palestine after Israeli decolonisation ('The Future Archaeology of Israel's Colonisation', spring 2009). The issues at this point (2007) went up from being published twice a year to the current rate of three times a year.

In 2006, Afterall instituted two series of books, the Readers and the One Works. The first Reader was on Eastern European art and was edited by the Slovenian art collective IRWIN; subsequent books have brought together essays on art and social change and art and the moving image. The One Works series looks at single works of contemporary art in an extended book-length analysis, and directs focus on the art object (or performance) itself.

In 2010, Afterall launched Exhibition Histories, a series of books focusing on key international exhibitions of contemporary art since 1955.

== Publications ==
=== Journal ===
The journal Afterall is published two times a year and is distributed worldwide by the University of Chicago Press. Each issue focuses on the work of three to five selected contemporary artists, with two or more essays on each. It has featured artists such as Chantal Akerman, Paweł Althamer, Kai Althoff, Michael Asher, Michael Clark, Enrico David, Maria Eichhorn, Cerith Wyn Evans, Harun Farocki, Omer Fast, Hans-Peter Feldmann, Isa Genzken, Hilary Lloyd, Goshka Macuga, Nasreen Mohamedi, The Red Krayola, Hito Steyerl, Sturtevant, Christopher Williams and The Wooster Group.

=== Critical Readers ===
Afterall's Critical Readers is a series of survey publications that aim to look at currently significant areas of modern and contemporary art practice through the commissioning and reprinting of key texts.

The Readers include:

- IRWIN, ed. (2006). East Art Map. Afterall and MIT Press.
- Esche, Charles; Bradley, Will, eds. (2007). Art and Social Change. Afterall and Tate Publishing.
- Leighton, Tanya; Esche, Charles, eds. (2008). Art and the Moving Image: A Critical Reader. Afterall and Tate Publishing.

=== Exhibition Histories ===
Launching in 2010, the Exhibition Histories book series addresses what happens when art becomes public. Publications to date have focused on curatorial experimentation; exhibition activity led by artists; and contested articulations of the ‘global’ and the ‘located’. The series is published in association with Asia Art Archive; the Center for Curatorial Studies, Bard College; and the Faculty of Fine, Applied and Performing Arts, University of Gothenburg.

Titles include:

- Rattemeyer, Christian, ed. (2010). Exhibiting the New Art: 'Op Losse Schroeven' and 'When Attitudes Become Form' 1969.
- Butler, Cornelia, ed. (2012). From Conceptualism to Feminism: Lucy Lippard’s Numbers Shows 1969–74.
- Lagnado, Lisette, (2015). Cultural Anthropophagy: The 24th Bienal de São Paulo 1998. Afterall and the Center for Curatorial Studies, Bard College.
- Chimurenga, ed. (2019). FESTAC ’77, the 2nd World Black and African Festival of Arts and Culture. Afterall and Chimurenga.

=== One Works ===
One Works is a series of books, each presenting a single work of art considered in detail by a single author. The focus of the series is on contemporary art and its aim is to provoke debate about significant moments in art's recent development.

One Works include:

- Adler, Dan (2009). Hanne Darboven: Cultural History 1880–1983.
- Harbord, Janet (2009). Chris Marker: La Jetée.
- Gidal, Peter (2008). Andy Warhol: Blow Job.
- Cerizza, Luca (2008). Alighiero e Boetti: Mappa.
- Wood, Catherine (2007). Yvonne Rainer: The Mind is a Muscle.
- Millar, Jeremy (2007). Fischli and Weiss: The Way Things Go.
- Holert, Tom (2007). Marc Camille Chaimowicz: Celebration? Realife.
- Myers, Terry R. (2007). Mary Heilmann: Save the Last Dance for Me.
- Morgan, Susan (2006). Joan Jonas: I Want to Live in the Country (And Other Romances).
- Newman, Michael (2006). Richard Prince: Untitled (couple).
- Moore, Rachel (2006). Hollis Frampton: (nostalgia).
- Groys, Boris (2006). Ilya Kabakov: The Man Who Flew into Space from His Apartment.
- Verwoert, Jan (2006). Bas Jan Ader: In Search of the Miraculous.
- Legge, Elizabeth (2009). Michael Snow: Wavelength.
- Campany, David (2011). Jeff Wall: Picture for Women.
- Bordowitz, Gregg (2018). Glenn Ligon: Untitled (I Am a Man).
- Steck, Ed (2021). David Horvitz: Newly Found Bas Jan Ader Film. Afterall. ISBN 978-0578957937.
- Warner, Marina (2022). Helen Chadwick: The Oval Court.
- Lewis, Mark (2022). Pierre Huyghe: Human Mask.

The series is distributed by MIT Press.

=== Two Works ===
The Two Works series engages with the visual artwork’s potential for productive encounter with text, putting a contemporary artist in dialogue with a critical text of historical significance.

Two Works include:

- Mulvey, Laura and Rose, Rachel (2016). Visual Pleasure and Narrative Cinema.
- Du Bois, W. E. B. and Quarles, Christina (2021). Of Our Spiritual Strivings.

== Exhibitions ==
Afterall has participated in international exhibitions such as Documenta, and regularly organises conferences and symposia at venues including Tate Britain, the Showroom Gallery, the Institute of Contemporary Arts and the British Film Institute in London; REDCAT in Los Angeles; The Kitchen and Electronic Arts Intermix (EAI) in New York; and the Academy of Fine Arts Vienna.
