= Michael Webber (filmmaker) =

American filmmaker

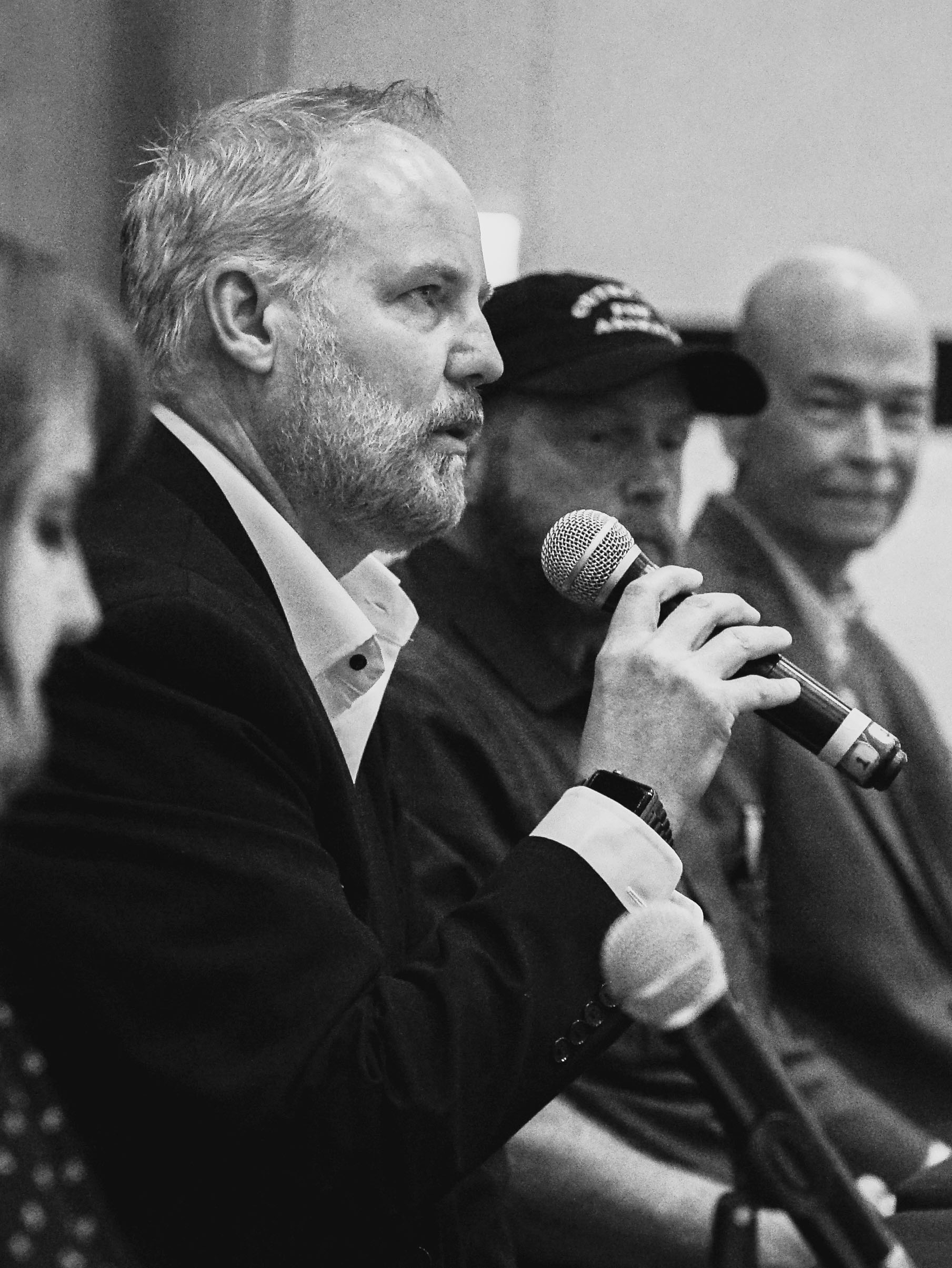
- Occupation(s): Film director, producer, cinematographer, visual effects supervisor
- Years active: 2000s–present
- Organization: NightFly Entertainment
- Notable work: The Conservation Game (2021); The Elephant in the Living Room (2010); The Student Body (2016); Like Dandelion Dust (2009)

Michael Webber (also known as Mike Webber) is an American motion picture producer, director, and cinematographer best known for his cinema verité style investigative documentaries The Elephant in the Living Room (2010) and The Conservation Game (2021), both of which focus on issues surrounding exotic animal ownership and wildlife conservation. His films have received critical acclaim and have contributed to societal and legislative change. Webber is the president and CEO of NightFly Entertainment and CEO of MainSail Productions.

== Early life and career ==
Webber began his career as a writer, screenwriter, visual effects supervisor, and commercial director. He produced multiple theatrical films for studios including 20th Century Fox and Lionsgate. After producing two films in Europe, Webber returned to the US to focus on investigative documentary filmmaking, a style and genre with which he had no previous experience. This marked a significant shift in his career, a move that would create a significant impact in the conservation and animal welfare space. Emmy Award-winning journalist Jay Schradler of ABC News' 20/20 profiled Webber's investigative filmmaking methodology.

== Documentary filmmaking ==
=== The Conservation Game (2021) ===
The Conservation Game is Webber's three-year undercover investigation into television celebrity conservationists and their alleged connections to the exotic pet trade. The documentary focuses particularly on Jack Hanna and allegations that "ambassador animals" like tiger cubs, which appeared with him on shows like The Tonight Show and Good Morning America, were actually being sourced from unaccredited facilities rather than accredited zoos as Hanna and others would suggest.

The film premiered at the Santa Barbara International Film Festival, where it won the Social Justice Award. The Santa Barbara Independent referred to the film as a "bombshell," Film Threat described it as "shocking," while many reviewers made comparisons to Blackfish and The Cove.

The day after the film's premiere, Hanna's family suddenly announced on Twitter that he was stepping away from public life due to fast progression of dementia. The timing of the announcement, raised eyebrows. Scott Marks, movie critic for the San Diego Reader, commented that "the cynic in me questions the timing... wondering if the family is using (the announcement) to keep the media from the door. Mom always told me not to speak ill of the ill. In this case, one doesn't have to. The facts speak for themselves."

Also following the film's release, Hanna's Columbus Zoo and Aquarium lost its accreditation from the Association of Zoos and Aquariums, with AZA president Dan Ashe acknowledging that animal practices revealed in the film were "more substantial and concerning" than previously understood.

The film also contributed to the passage of the Big Cat Public Safety Act, with Congressman Mike Quigley stating that "'The Conservation Game' shines a light on an important issue that my colleagues and I in Congress have been working diligently to address for years." One year following the release of the film, the act was signed into law in December 2022.

=== The Elephant in the Living Room (2010) ===
Webber's 2010 documentary The Elephant in the Living Room (Netflix) exposed the American exotic pet trade through Tim Harrison, an Ohio public safety officer whose friend was killed by an pet rhino viper, and Terry Brumfield, who raised African lions in his home as pets.

The documentary received widespread critical acclaim with Academy Award-winning director Michael Moore calling the film "One of the scariest, most entertaining and technically perfect films." The Humane Society of the United States awarded the film a Genesis Award. The film also contributed to Ohio's passage of the Dangerous Wild Animals Act in 2012, transforming the state from having minimal exotic animal regulations to what advocates described as a "national model" for exotic animal laws.

=== The Student Body (2016) ===
The Student Body, co-directed with his daughter Bailey Webber, is Webber's second Netflix-released documentary that investigated state mandated BMI testing programs in school and the negative impact on students. The film received critical praise for its investigative approach. The documentary won the Independent Spirit Award at the Sedona International Film Festival and directly influenced lawmakers approach to the obesity epidemic among children.

== Tiger King and cultural commentary ==
Following the 2020 release of Netflix's Tiger King: Murder, Mayhem and Madness, The New York Times article by Rachel Nuwer titled "Why 'Tiger King' Is Not 'Blackfish' for Big Cats," quoted Webber openly criticizing the series for creating what he termed a false equivalency between legitimate animal sanctuaries and exploitative operations, arguing that the show prioritized sensationalism over truthfulness. His criticism was also featured in the Longreads podcast "What 'Tiger King' Gets Wrong About Tigers."

Many film critics mentioned Webber's filmmaking style as a direct contrast to Tiger King's sensationalistic, reality TV approach. Critics noted that "wisely, director Michael Webber takes an approach that is the polar opposite of The Tiger King". Film critic Andy Howell characterized the difference as "If Tiger King is the tabloid take on the big cat story, The Conservation Game is the Pro Publica version", even drawing a literary parallel: "Tiger King is Rosencrantz and Guildenstern are Dead and The Conservation Game is Hamlet. The farce is good for a few laughs, but the tragedy has more staying power."

Carole Baskin, who featured prominently in Tiger King, was highly critical of the series and its directors, claiming that they misrepresented themselves during the production and her in the show. By contrast, Baskin and her husband Howard openly endorsed The Conservation Game in the media, while also attending premieres for the film. Baskin stated that The Conservation Game represented "the documentary she thought Tiger King would be."

== Filmography ==
=== Documentary films ===
Year	Title	Role	Distributor	Notes
2021	The Conservation Game	Director, producer, cinematographer	Peacock	Winner at Santa Barbara International Film Festival
2016	The Student Body	Co-director, producer, cinematographer	Netflix	Winner of Independent Spirit Award at Sedona Film Festival; co-directed with Bailey Webber
2010	The Elephant in the Living Room	Director, Producer, Cinematographer	Netflix	Won 5 Best Documentary Awards; #1 independent film in US for 3 weeks

=== Films ===
Year	Title	Role	Distributor	Notes
2013	The Devil You Know	Producer	VOD release	Mystery thriller starring Rosamund Pike and Lena Olin
2009	Like Dandelion Dust	Co-producer	20th Century Fox	Drama starring Mira Sorvino and Barry Pepper; 26 film festival awards
2008	House	Co-producer	Lionsgate	Horror film based on novel by Ted Dekker and Frank Peretti
2006	Thr3e	Co-producer	20th Century Fox	Psychological thriller based on Ted Dekker novel
2006	The Visitation	Co-producer	20th Century Fox	Supernatural thriller starring Edward Furlong and Martin Donovan

== Awards ==
Year	Award	Category	Work	Result
2021	Santa Barbara International Film Festival	Social Justice Award	The Conservation Game	Won
2021	Animalis Fabula Film Festival	Outstanding Achievement Award	The Conservation Game	Won
2016	Sedona Film Festival	Independent Spirit Award	The Student Body	Won
2011	Humane Society of the United States	Genesis Award	The Elephant in the Living Room	Won
2010	Traverse City Film Festival	Director's Choice Award	The Elephant in the Living Room	Won
2010	SilverDocs/AFI/Discovery Channel Documentary Festival	ACE Award	The Elephant in the Living Room	Won
2010	Burbank International Film Festival	Best Socially Conscious Film	The Elephant in the Living Room	Won
2010	Burbank International Film Festival	Best Documentary	The Elephant in the Living Room	Won
2010	The United Film Festivals (London)	Best Documentary	The Elephant in the Living Room	Won
2010	Sedona International Film Festival	Best Documentary	The Elephant in the Living Room	Won
2009	Various film festivals	Best Feature Film (26 awards)	Like Dandelion Dust	Won
