= Douglas C. Gordon =

Whitewater kayaker (1956–1998)

Doug Gordon
- Born: Douglas Cameron Gordon; 1956
- Died: October 16, 1998 (aged 41–42); Tsangpo River, Eastern Tibet
- Education: Harvard University
- Occupation: Chemist
- Known for: Whitewater kayaker

Douglas Cameron Gordon, commonly known as Doug Gordon, (1956 – October 16, 1998) was an American whitewater kayaker, who was a member of the U.S. Slalom Team from 1981 to 1987, and a chemist. Gordon died in Eastern Tibet when he and three other paddlers attempted the first descent of the Tsangpo River.

== Kayaking ==
Gordon was a member of the U.S. Slalom Team from 1981 to 1987. He obtained several medals from the National Championships and qualified four times for the Whitewater Slalom World Championships.

In 1995 and 1996, Gordon participated in expeditions to British Columbia, with Jamie McEwan and E.J. McCarthy on the Homathko River and with McEwan and Mark Clarke on the Dean River, respectively.

When Gordon heard about the death of slalom kayaker Richie Weiss, in 1997, he wrote according to Jamie McEwan that "running hard whitewater is dangerous, and that those doing so must accept that danger as the price of pursuing their sport at a high level."

=== Expedition to the Tsangpo: The first 10 days ===
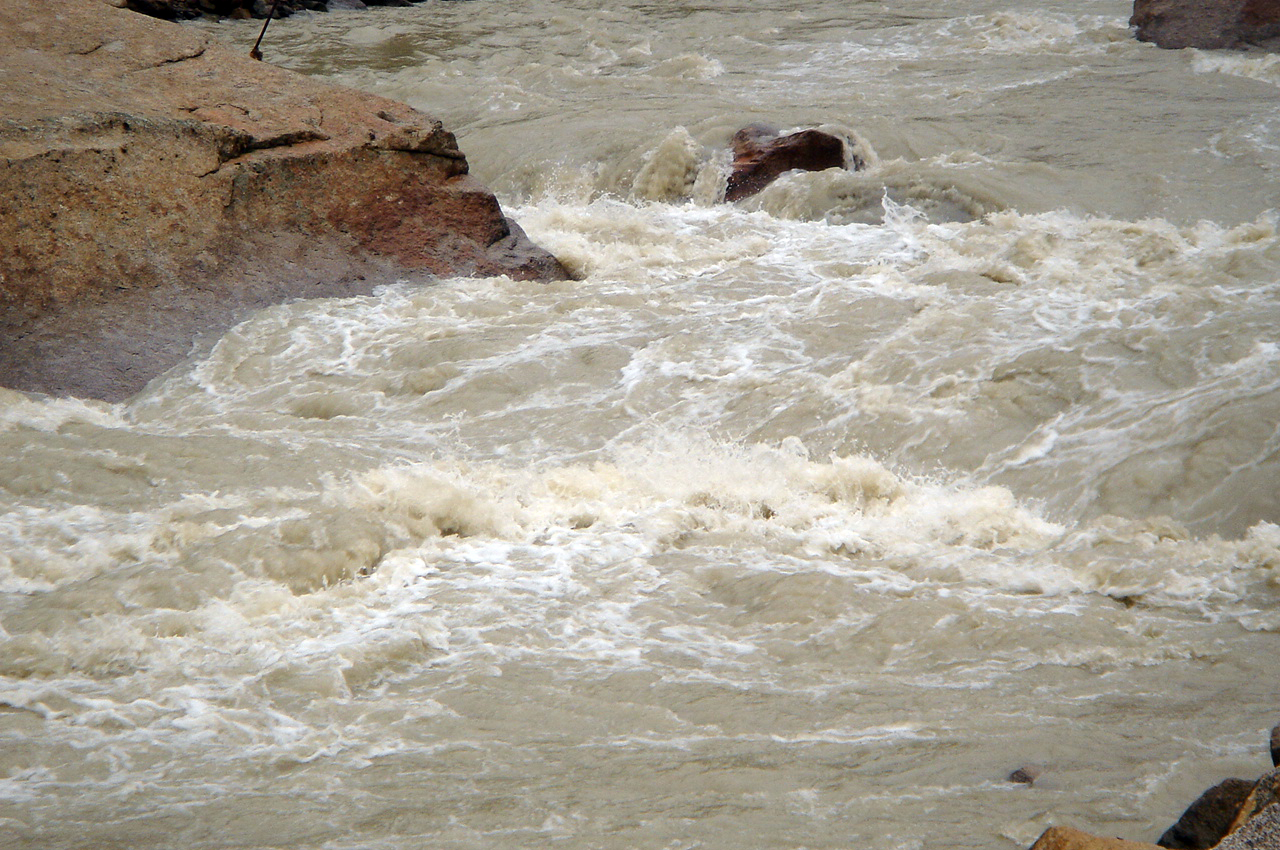
Tsangpo River whitewater

In 1998, Gordon participated in an expedition to the Tibetan river Tsangpo (named the Brahmaputra River in its lower course), sponsored by National Geographic. The team of strong paddlers also included the brothers Jamie McEwan (Olympic slalom bronze medalist in 1972) and Tom McEwan (former slalom racer, with first descent experience including the Great Falls of the Potomac), and Roger Zbel. Three of them would use expedition kayaks, one a whitewater canoe. Gordon was the most experienced of the team, but all were considered expert river runners. A ground crew of five completed the expedition. Their plan was to accomplish the first descent of a 140-mile (225 km) section of the Tsangpo, passing the deepest river gorge on earth, the more than 4877 meter (16,000 ft) deep gorge between 7782-meter Namjagbarwa Feng and 7194-meter Gyala Peri. The paddlers had planned up to six weeks for the descent.

When the team arrived, they found that the Tsangpo had a medium-high flow, much higher than when Wicklife W. "Wick" Walker (the expedition leader) and Tom McEwan had scouted it the previous fall at about 10,000 cu ft/s (280 m^{3}/s); the volume now supposedly reached 50,000 cu ft/s (1,400 m^{3}/s), three times what the expedition team had expected. The reasons were the year's severe monsoon season and the la niña phenomenon. In fact, the water levels had already dramatically decreased in the days before the team arrived: Jamie McEwan estimated from the look of the banks that a few weeks earlier, the highest waterline had been about 3-6 vertical meters higher; and only ten days earlier, German kayaker Lukas Blucher had estimated a flow of 70,000 to 90,000 cu ft/s (2,000 to 2,500 m^{3}/s), whereas Jamie McEwan estimated only 25,000 to 50,000 cu ft/s (710 to 1,400 m^{3}/s) when they arrived. While the team was there, the water levels continued to drop, by about 5–10 cm per day, but the current remained very strong. This later led to criticism from some of the paddling community, who "considered [the water level] suicidal." Apart from the water flow, the difficulty of the river is caused by the relatively steep average river gradient of 1.23%.

The team decided to stick nonetheless to their plan of running the parts of the Tsangpo which they could, and carry their boats where they could not, even though they now expected a larger portion of hiking. As planned, the four paddlers would run or hike the gorge by themselves, carrying their own equipment and food for 15 days. The ground team would meet them further downriver. As a result, the boats had to be loaded with provisions for several days, which may have made "the kayaks ungainly and hard to maneuver," at least compared to expeditions with a larger support crew to carry equipment and provisions for the paddlers.

On October 5, 1998, the paddlers started their run at the town of Pei. They kept scouting far ahead before running sections of the river. Even where they boated, they usually stayed to the sides of the Tsangpo to avoid the powerful main current, which was so strong that they rarely found places where they could safely ferry over to the other side of the river.

After two days, Jamie McEwan slid from the rocks on the river side into the water before having completely secured his spraydeck. When his boat flipped over, water entered and made it impossible to upright the boat. Jamie McEwan exited his boat and swam to shore, but his boat and equipment were swept downstream. They were found and taken by Tibetan hunters and pilgrims to Gyala, which the paddlers reached four days into their river run, with McEwan hiking the last two days. After Gyala, the river was expected to be even steeper, based on topological information of the paddlers.

=== Expedition to the Tsangpo: Death ===
On October 16, after 35 miles (60 km) of the originally intended route, the team advanced and scouted on the river-left ledge. Tom McEwan was to remain at a lower part of the river to film the descent of the other three and be able to throw a safety line (throw rope) in the case of an emergency, a standard safety procedure in whitewater paddling. Gordon was the first to paddle the section. He chose a route over a waterfall of 8 feet (2 m), hugging the river-left, in order to boof (skip over) a rock at its bottom and land in an eddy current (calmer water) beneath. At the foot of the waterfall, however, he was pulled into a hydraulic in the middle of the falls' bottom and flipped over. He did not manage to upright his boat ("roll up") at once, but was flushed out of the hydraulic, towards the middle of the Tsangpo—passing approximately 100 yards (90 m) from Tom McEwan, far out of reach of the safety line. At the bottom of the falls was a stretch of approximately 100 yards (90 m) of calmer water. If Gordon had managed to right his boat at this point, he could still have paddled to safety. Two further roll attempts failed, however, and he was swept into a succession of rapids which Tom McEwan later described as "a certainly fatal series of recirculating hydraulics." His team members later conjectured that Gordon had not managed to roll up because he had been partly pulled out of his boat, as had happened to him once before earlier on the trip. Neither Gordon nor his kayak was seen again.

The other three paddlers started a search for Gordon. Tom McEwan and Zbel hastened down the river ledge while Jamie McEwan emptied his boat, carried it down the difficult section, and joined the search on the water. The following days, the three continued the search for Gordon's remains downriver. Walker and another ground team member, who had been informed via satellite telephone, went to the river and searched further downriver.

On October 20, the three paddlers and the ground team members met 8.5 miles (10 km) below the place where the accident had occurred. Gordon was presumed dead, family and authorities informed, and the search discontinued. The expedition was called off, and after a small ceremony for Gordon, the expedition members left on the most direct route, consisting in seven days of hiking and three days of driving to Lhasa.

A memorial service for Gordon was held in Cornwall, Connecticut, on November 21, 1998.

=== Further Tsangpo kayaking expeditions ===
Already in 1993, Japanese kayaker Takei Yoshitaka had died on the Tsangpo, within 1 mile (2 km) of his put-in near the confluence with the Po Tsangpo River. His and Gordon's death helped to create the ill fame of the Tsangpo as a particularly difficult, if not unrunnable river; some use the catchphrases "Everest of whitewater" or "Everest of Rivers."

The next expedition to the Tsangpo was started in the winter of 2002, well after the monsoon season and before the snow melted. Kayaker Scott Lindgren employed an international crew of 87 people from seven countries to support the descent of several paddlers.

=== Video and books on the expedition to the Tsangpo ===
Some of the film material of the expedition was later published as a documentary, aired in the United States on the Discovery Channel. Dedicated to Gordon, the film included footage that Tom McEwan shot right before Gordon's death. This part of the documentary, which has also found its way onto the internet, gives a somewhat misleading account of the circumstances of Gordon's death, as evidenced by online comments on the video. First, a voice-over claims that the water level of the Tsangpo had not been this high "in decades", without mentioning that the level had already dramatically dropped before the paddlers even arrived at the river. In addition, video from briefly before Gordon's death shows how he approached the waterfall, and how his boat was sucked into the hydraulic at the bottom of the fall, flipped over, and finally flushed out. As the video ends there, it evokes the false impression that he died in the hydraulic of the waterfall. The voice of one of the other three paddlers is heard, however, commenting on the moment when Gordon was swept into the hydraulics in the middle of the river: "I saw him disappear into the first hole, and I never saw him again."

Two books were written on the expedition, one of them by expedition leader Walker.

- Todd Balf (2001). The Last River: The Tragic Race for Shangri-la. Three Rivers Press. ISBN 978-0-609-80801-6
- Wicklife W. "Wick" Walker (2000). Courting the Diamond Sow : A Whitewater Expedition on Tibet's Forbidden River. National Geographic. ISBN 978-0-7922-7960-0

== Career in chemistry and private life ==
Gordon obtained a degree from Harvard University. He later lived in Kinburn, Ontario, and then in Cornwall Bridge, Connecticut, where he worked for Advanced Technology Materials, Inc. At the time of his death, he was a doctoral candidate at the University of Utah. Gordon had received a National Science Foundation Fellowship in chemistry, had published 15 scientific articles on chemistry (some of them before starting his doctoral studies), and was registered as inventor or co-inventor on four U.S. patents during his lifetime and on one patent post-mortem.

He was married and had two sons, aged 2 and 5 at the time of his death.

=== Selected publications in chronological order ===
- Gordon, Douglas C.; Kirss, Rein U.; & Brown, Duncan W. (1992). Synthesis and characterization of volatile trifluoromethyl alkyl tellurides. Organometallics, 11, 2947–2949.
- Patnaik, Sanjay; Ho, K.-L.; Jensen, Klavs F.; Gordon, Douglas C.; Kirss, Rein U.; & Brown, Duncan W. (1993). Decomposition of allylselenium sources in the metalorganic chemical vapor deposition of zinc selenide. Chemistry of Materials, 5(3), 305–310.
- Danek, Michal; Patnaik, Sanjay; Jensen, Klavs F.; Gordon, Douglas C.; Brown, Duncan W.; & Kirss, Rein U. (1993). tert-Butyl(trifluoromethyl)tellurium: A novel organometallic chemical vapor deposition source for ZnTe. Chemistry of Materials, 5, 1321–1326.
- Gardiner, Robin A.; Gordon, Douglas C.; Stauf, Gregory T.; Vaartsra, Brian A.; Ostrander, Robert L.; & Rheingold, Arnold L. (1994). Mononuclear barium diketonate polyamine adducts. Synthesis, structure, and use in MOCVD of barium titanite. Chemistry of Materials, 6, 1967–1970.
- Danek, Michal; Huh, Jeung-Soo; Jensen, Klavs F.; Gordon, Douglas C.; & Kosar, Walter P. (1994). Proc. Mater. Res. Soc.
- Danek, Michal; Huh, Jeung-Soo; Jensen, Klavs F.; Gordon, Douglas C.; & Kosar, Walter P. (1995). Gas-phase pyrolysis of tert-butyl(trifluoromethyl)tellurium, a new precursor for organometallic chemical vapor deposition of ZnSe. Chemistry of Materials, 7, 731–737.
- Zhang, Jie; Liable-Sands, Louise M.; Rheingold, Arnold L.; Del Sesto, Rico E.; Gordon, Douglas C.; Burkhart, Brian M.; & Miller, Joel S. (1998). Isolation and structural determination of octacyanobutanediide, [C4(CN)8]22; precursors to M(TCNE)x magnets. Chemical Communications, 1385–1386.

post-mortem:

- Gordon, Douglas C.; Deakin, Laura; Arif, Atta M.; & Miller, Joel S. (2000). Identification of [MII(Arene)2]2+ (M = V, Cr) as the Key Intermediate in the Formation of V[TCNE]x·ySolvent Magnets and Cr[TCNE]x·Solvent. Journal of the American Chemical Society, 122(2), 290–299.

=== U.S. Patents ===
- United States Patent 5051785 – Beetz, Gordon, & Brown (1991). N-type semiconducting diamond, and method of making the same
- United States Patent 5312983 – Brown, Kirss, & Gordon (1994). Organometallic tellurium compounds useful in chemical vapor deposition processes

post-mortem:

- United States Patent 7323581 – Gardiner et al. (2008). Reagent compositions and method for forming metal films on a substrate by chemical vapor deposition (filed in August, 2000)
