= Michel Weber (canoeist) =

Medal record

Men's canoe slalom

Representing Switzerland

World Championships
Bronze medal – third place	1961 Hainsberg	C-1 team

Michel Weber is a Swiss retired slalom canoeist who competed from the late 1950s to the late 1960s. He won a bronze medal in the C-1 team event at the 1961 ICF Canoe Slalom World Championships in Hainsberg.
