= Hain, Thuringia =

Hain
- Ortsteil of Langenwetzendorf
- Interactive map of Hain
- Location within Germany Location within Thuringia
- Coordinates: 50°42′28″N 12°4′58″E
- Country: Germany
- State: Thuringia
- District: Greiz
- Municipality: Langenwetzendorf

Area
  - Total: 2.72 km^{2} (1.05 sq mi)
- Elevation: 340 m (1,120 ft)

Population (2012-12-31)
  - Total: 74
  - Density: 27/km^{2} (70/sq mi)
- Time zone: UTC+01:00 (CET)
  - Summer (DST): UTC+02:00 (CEST)
- Postal codes: 07957
- Dialling codes: 036625

Hain is a village and a former municipality in the district of Greiz, in Thuringia, Germany. Since 31 December 2013, it is part of the municipality Langenwetzendorf. The small village Hainsberg, also part of the municipality Langenwetzendorf, is located 1.8 km (1.1 mi) southeast of Hain.
