= Porcia =

Porcia may refer to:

== People ==
- Porcia gens, ancient Roman family
  - Porcia (wife of Brutus)
  - Porcia (sister of Cato the Younger)
- Ferdinando Porcia (1835–1896), Italian painter
- Francesco Porcia (1531–1612), Italian painter

== Others ==
- Valerian and Porcian laws, Roman laws
- Basilica Porcia, civil basilica in Rome
- Porcia, Friuli Venezia Giulia, a municipality in Italy
- Porcia (Fra Bartolomeo), painting by Fra Bartolomeo
- Portrait of Count Antonio Porcia and Brugnera, painting by Titian
- Palais Porcia, Vienna
- Palais Porcia, Baroque mansion in Munich
- Palazzo Loredan Porcia, palace of the House of Loredan in Pordenone
- Komödienspiele Porcia, annual comedy festival
- Schloss Porcia, a castle in Spittal an der Drau, Austria

== See also ==
- Porcius (disambiguation)
- Portia (disambiguation)
- Porsche
