= Burgruine Ortenburg =

Castle in Austria

Coordinates: 46°47′37″N 13°27′32″E

- Baldramsdorf, Carinthia, Austria
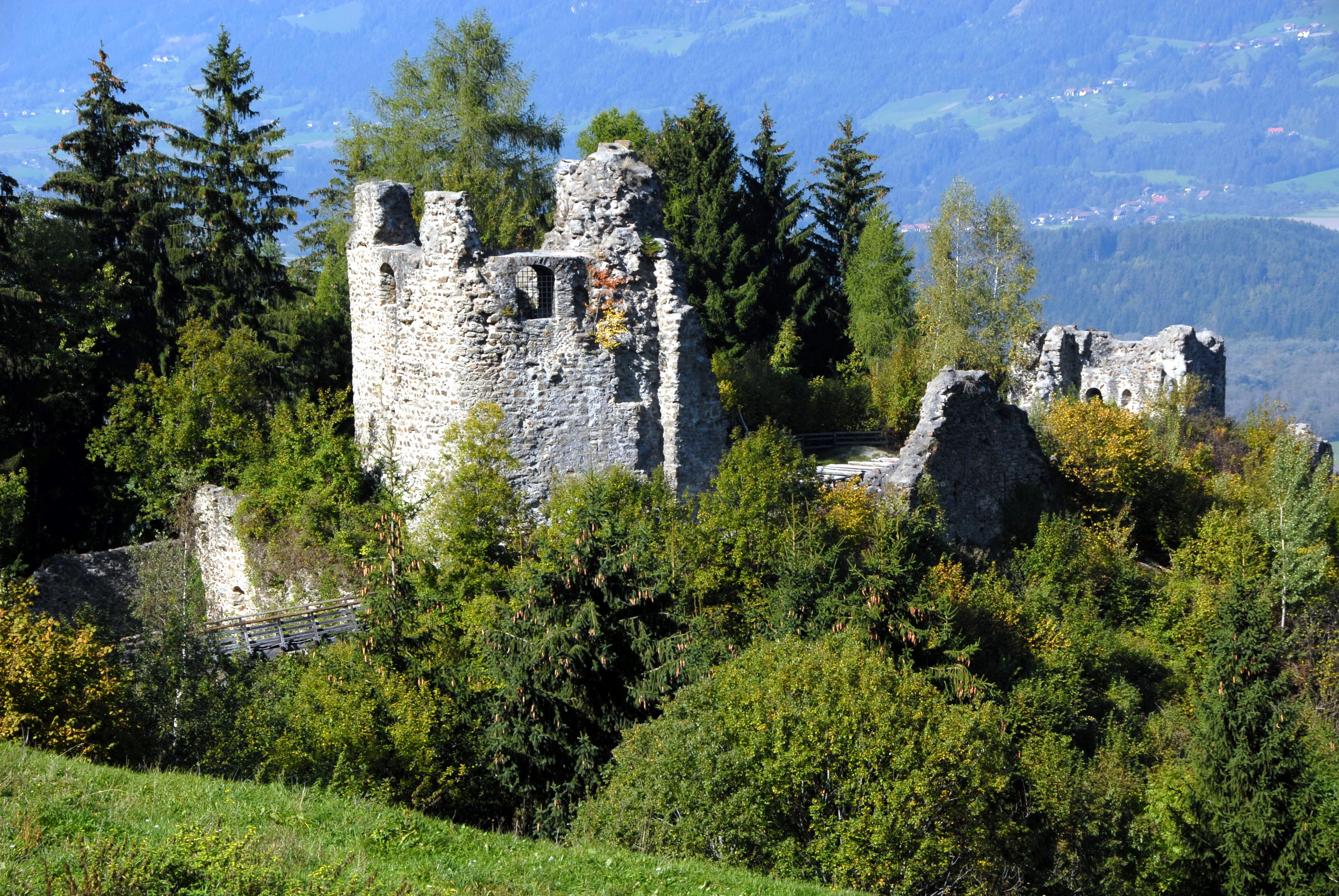

Site information
- Type: hill castle
- Open to the public: yes
- Condition: ruin

Location
- Height: 740 m (2,430 ft)

Site history
- Built: c. 1070-96
- Built by: Counts of Ortenburg

Ortenburg Castle is a ruined mediaeval castle located in Baldramsdorf, in the Austrian state of Carinthia. It is located on the northern slope of Mt. Goldeck, part of the Gailtal Alps, above the Drava valley at a height of 740 m (2,430 ft).

== History ==
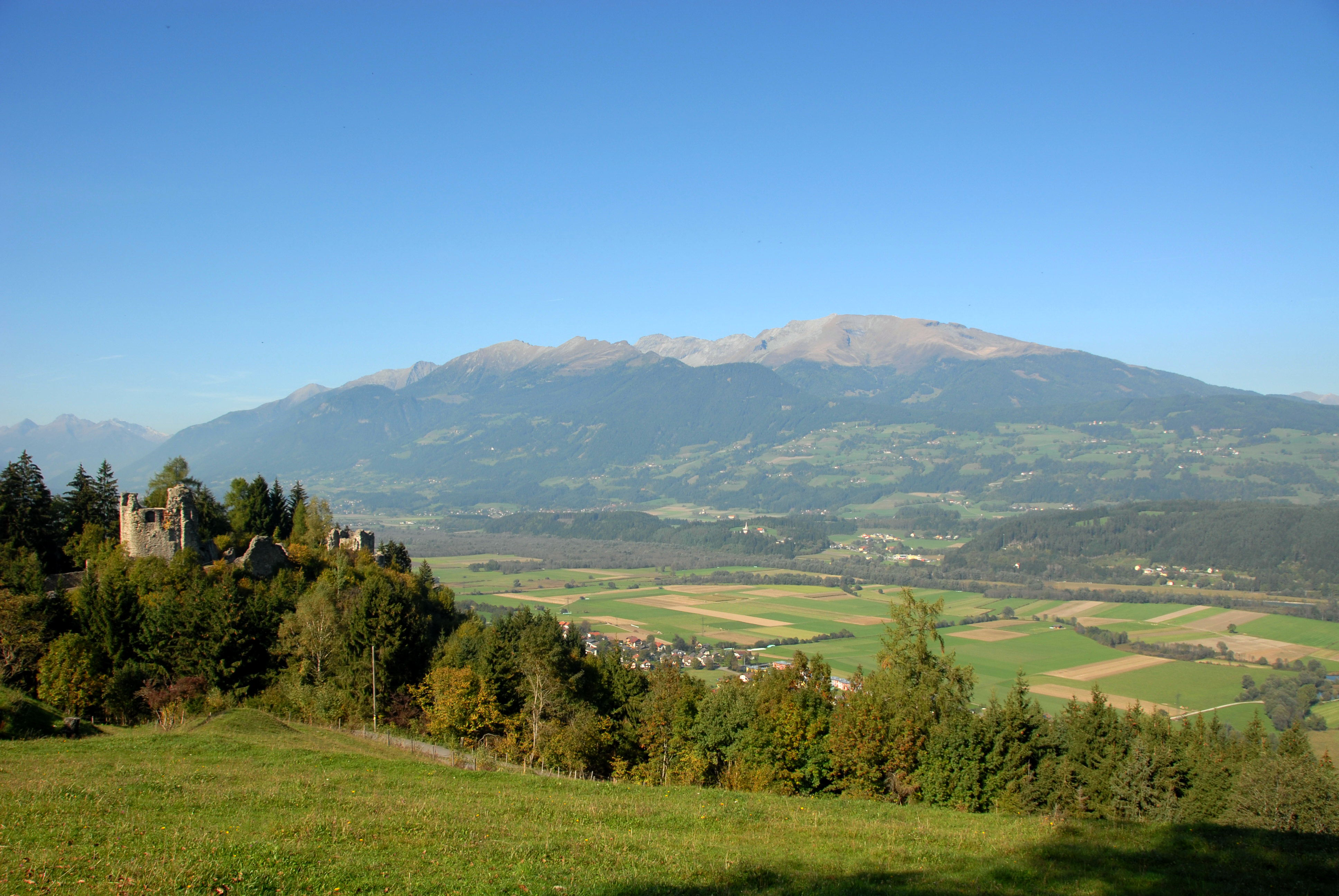
View over the Drava valley from Ortenburg Castle

The construction of the fortress was begun in the late 11th century by one noble Adalbert from Bavaria, a ministerialis of the Bishops of Freising, who then held large possessions in the Upper Carinthian Lurngau around the former Roman city of Teurnia. Adalbert's son Otto appeared as a Count of Ortenburg in 1141. First mentioned in an 1136 deed, Ortenburg Castle served as an administrative centre of the vast Ortenburg estates, initially rivalled by the Counts of Lurn with their ancestral seat at Hohenburg Castle beyond the Drava river.

The Ortenburg inherited large estates in the Drava valley upon the extinction of the Lurn counts in 1135. In 1192 Count Otto II of Ortenburg and his brother Hermann founded the settlement of Spittal below the castle. Otto II is also mentioned as a participant of the Crusade of Henry VI in 1195. In 1276 the Ortenburgs sided with Count Meinhard II of Gorizia-Tyrol and the newly elected Habsburg king Rudolf I of Germany against the occupying forces of King Ottokar II of Bohemia. Damaged by the 1348 Friuli earthquake, however, the significance of the comital castle diminished in favour of the nearby Spittal residence.

After the extinction of the Ortenburgs upon the death of Count Frederick III in 1418, their estates were enfeoffed to Count Hermann II of Celje by his son-in-law Emperor Sigismund. Upon the death of Hermann's grandson Count Ulrich II in 1456, the former Ortenburg possessions were finally seized by the Imperial House of Habsburg, defying inheritance claims raised by Count John II of Gorizia. Several clashes of arms followed when John laid siege to Ortenburg Castle; however, he was finally defeated by the forces of Emperor Frederick III in 1460 and had to renounce the Ortenburg heritage. During the Carinthian Peasant Revolt of 1478, one of the leading insurgents, Peter Wunderlich, was imprisoned at Ortenburg Castle, before he was executed in nearby Lendorf.

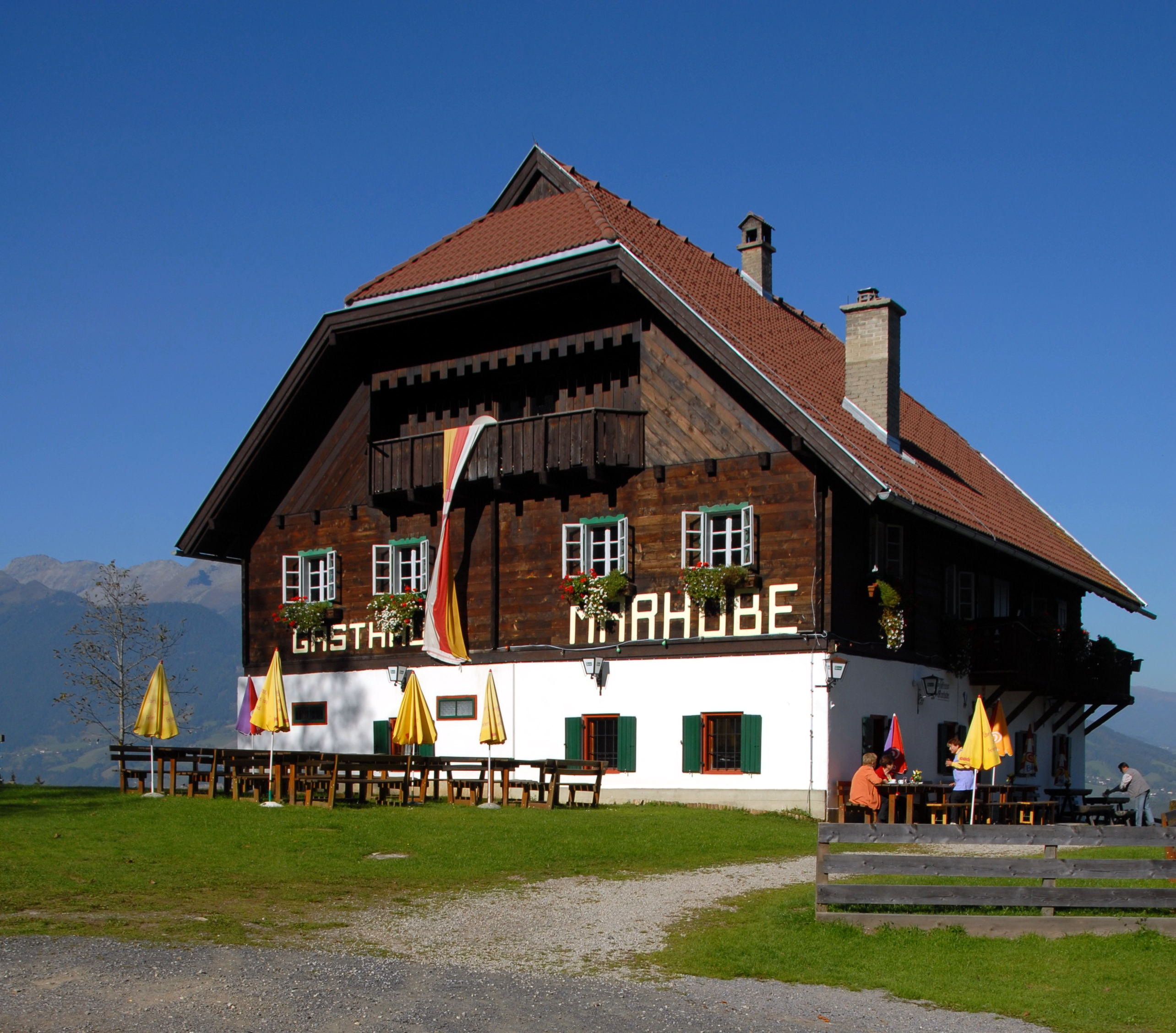
Marhube inn

In 1524 the comital title passed to Gabriel von Salamanca, a favourite of the Habsburg archduke Ferdinand I, who had a lavish new residence, present-day Porcia Castle, built in Spittal from about 1530 onwards. Again damaged by an earthquake and a storm in 1690, Ortenburg Castle decayed. In 1976, the ruins were secured and made accessible to the public.

== See also ==
- List of castles in Austria
