= Baldramsdorf =

- Municipality
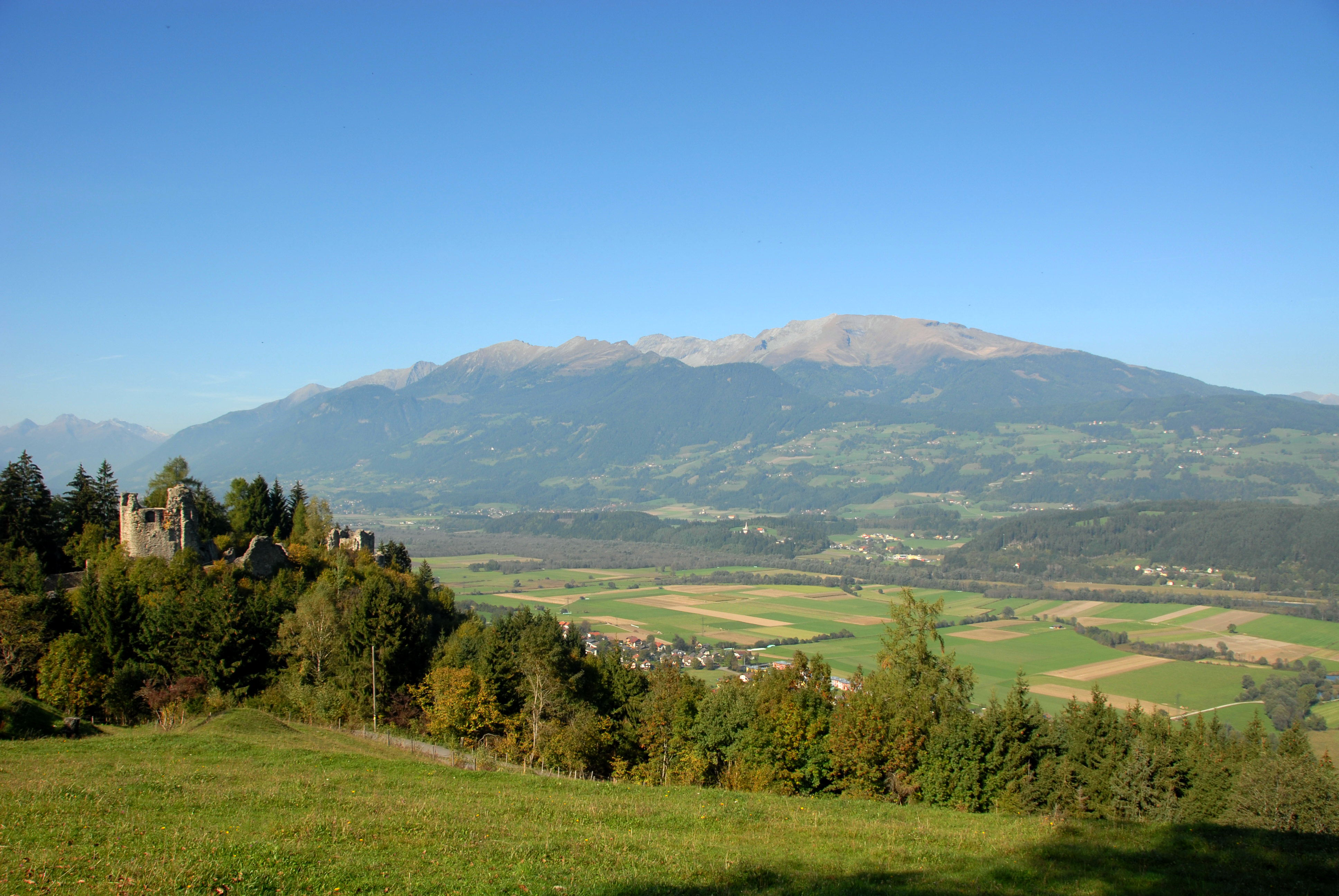
- View from Mt Goldeck

- Coat of arms

- Location within Austria
- Coordinates: 46°48′N 13°27′E
- Country: Austria
- State: Carinthia
- District: Spittal an der Drau

Government
  - Mayor: Friedrich Paulitsch (SPÖ)

Area
  - Total: 37.94 km^{2} (14.65 sq mi)
- Elevation: 584 m (1,916 ft)

Population (2018-01-01)
  - Total: 1,866
  - Density: 49.18/km^{2} (127.4/sq mi)
- Time zone: UTC+1 (CET)
  - Summer (DST): UTC+2 (CEST)
- Postal code: 9805
- Area code: 04762
- Website: www.baldramsdorf.at

Baldramsdorf is a municipality in the district of Spittal an der Drau in the Austrian state of Carinthia.

== Geography ==
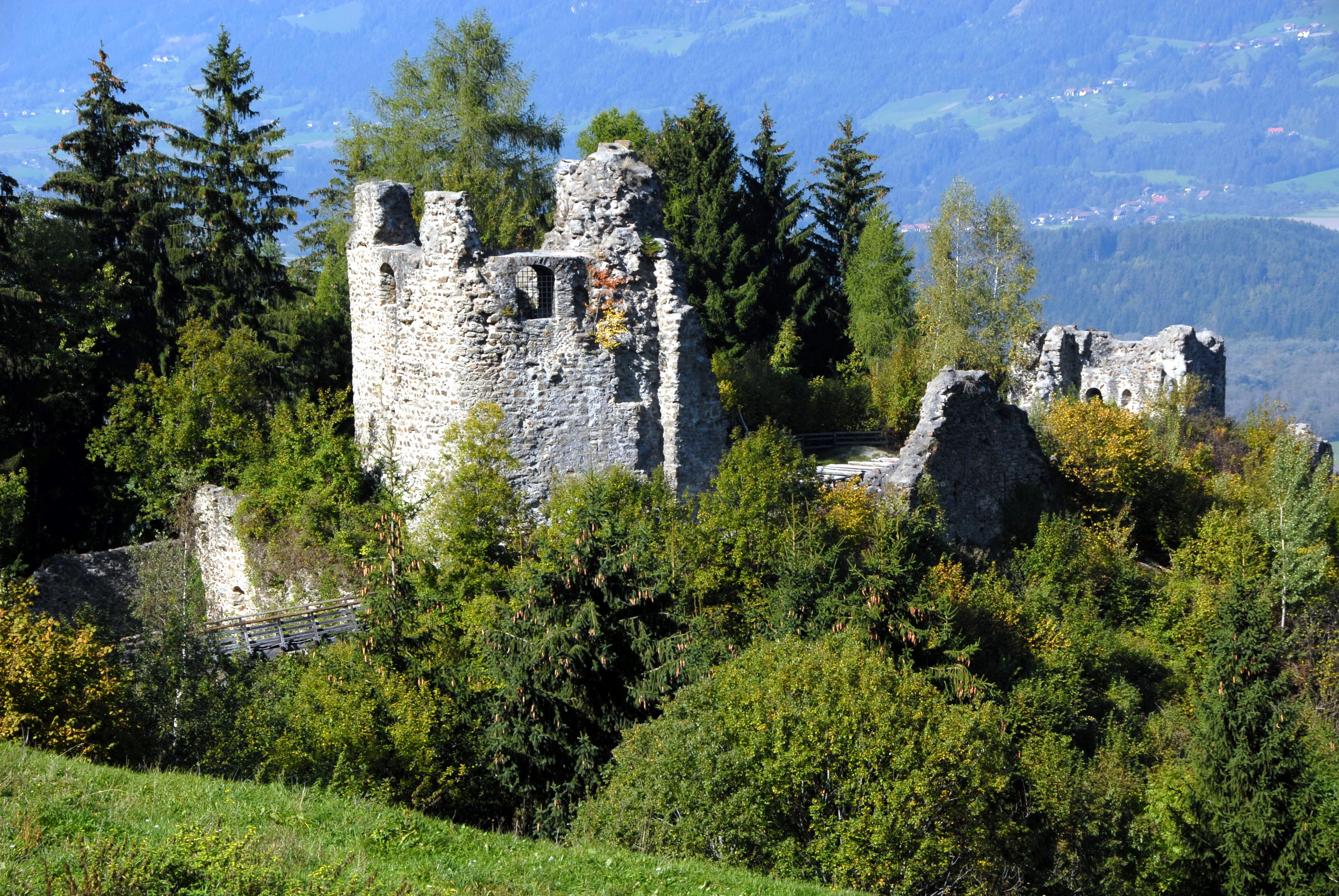
Ortenburg Castle

The municipal area stretches west of Spittal an der Drau in the southern part of the Lurnfeld valley between the Drava river and the slopes of the Goldeck mountain, part of the Gailtal Alps. The municipality comprises the cadastral communities of Baldramsdorf and Gschieß.

== History ==
Both Baldramsdorf and Gschieß were first mentioned in an 1166 deed. Ortenburg Castle, located on a rock above the Unterhaus settlement, was already documented in the 11th century; it was probably erected from about 1090 onwards and finished in 1140. The former seat of the Counts of Ortenburg, who also founded the neighbouring town of Spittal in 1191, decayed after the extinction of the line in 1418. Today only ruins remain.

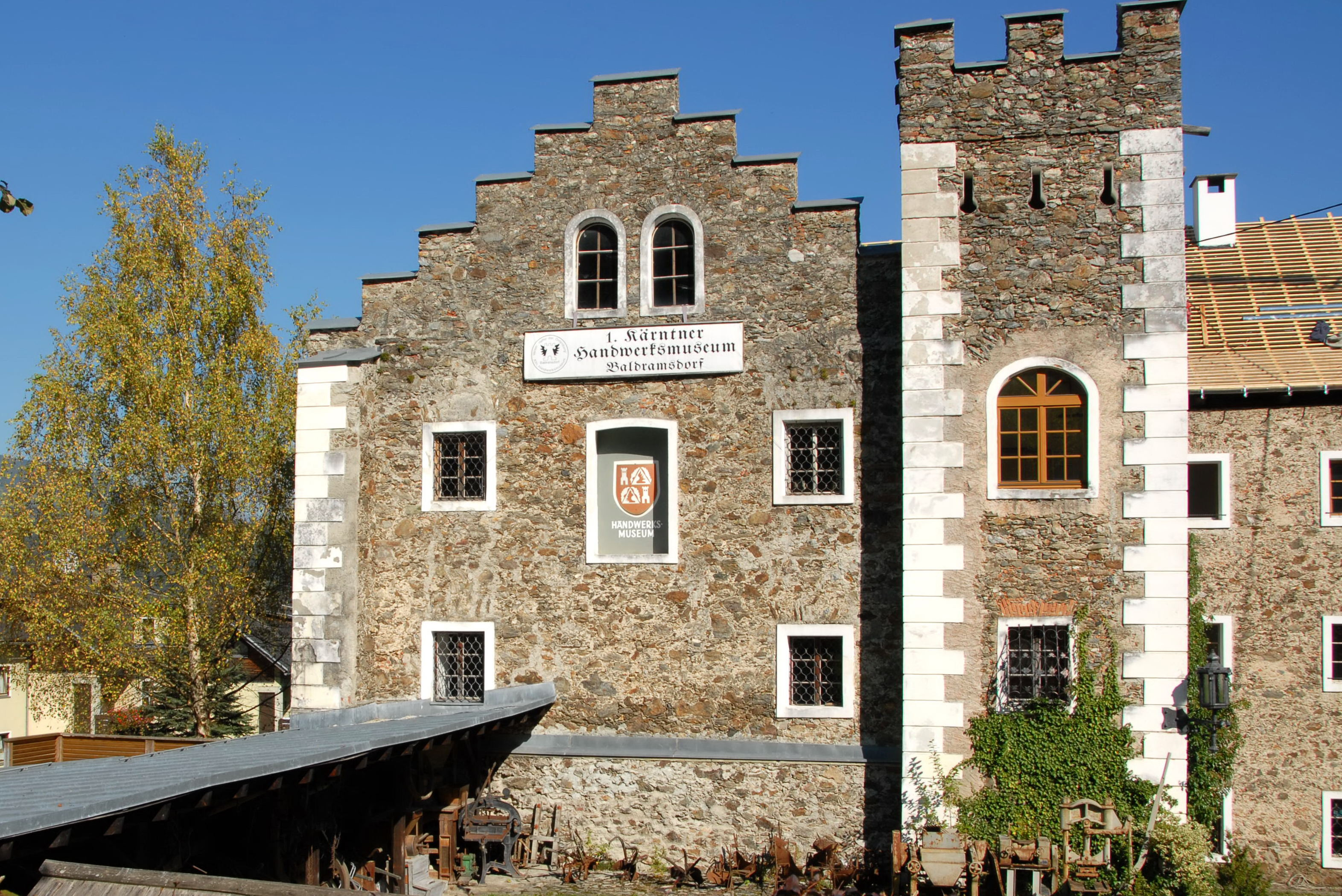
Unterhaus Castle

The Habsburg emperor Frederick III, having seized the former Ortenburg estates, had Unterhaus Castle (Paternschloss) erected below the medieval fortress, it was rebuilt from 1710 onwards as a Hieronymite monastery at the behest of the local Porcia princes, in order to encounter crypto-protestant practises in the area. The convent was dissolved in the course of the Josephinist reforms; the building today houses the First Carinthian Handicraft Museum.

== Politics ==
The municipal council (Gemeinderat) is composed of 15 members and, following the 2021 Carinthian local elections, represents the following parties:

- Social Democratic Party of Austria (SPÖ): 8 seats
- List for Baldramsdorf (LFB): 4 seats
- Freedom Party of Austria (FPÖ): 3 seats

The mayor of Baldramsdorf, Friedrich Paulitsch (SPÖ), was elected in 2021.
