= Herrengasse 23 =

Herrengasse 23 may refer to:

- Herrengasse 23 (Bern), a historic building in Switzerland.
- Palais Porcia (Vienna), the building at the Herrengasse 23 address in Vienna, Austria.

Herrengasse means "Street of the Lords" or "Lords Lane" in German.
