= Portia =

Portia may refer to:

== Biology ==
- Portia (spider), a genus of jumping spiders
- Portia tree, a plant native to Polynesia
- Anaea troglodyta or Portia, a brush-footed butterfly

== Other uses ==
- Portia (given name), the history and usage of the given name
- Portia (moon), a moon of Uranus
- Portia, Missouri, a community in the United States
- PORTIA, portfolio-management software from Thomson Financial
- Portia Club, a women's club in Payette, Idaho, U.S.
- HMS Lennox (1914) or HMS Portia, a Laforey-class destroyer launched in 1914
- Portia (The Merchant of Venice), female protagonist of Shakespeare's The Merchant of Venice
- Portia (painting), an 1886 painting by John Everett Millais

== See also ==
- My Time at Portia, a 2019 video game by Pathea Games
- Porcia (disambiguation)
- Porsche (disambiguation)
