= Minerva (Fra Bartolomeo) =

Painting by Fra Bartolomeo, c. 1490–1495

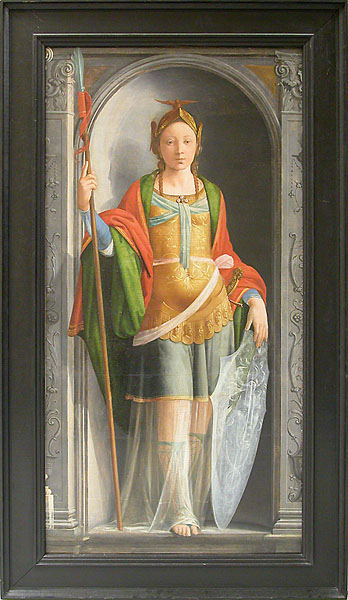
- Artist: Fra Bartolomeo
- Year: c. 1490-1495
- Medium: oil on panel
- Dimensions: 117 cm × 59 cm (46 in × 23 in)
- Location: Louvre, Paris

Minerva is an oil-on-panel painting created c. 1490–1495 by the Italian Renaissance painter Fra Bartolomeo, now in the Louvre in Paris. It forms a pair with Porcia (Uffizi).

== Attribution ==
The work was first recorded in 1942 in an antiques shop in Toulouse, at which time it was attributed to Lorenzo Costa. Three years later it was acquired by France's Réunion des Musées Nationaux as a work by an anonymous French artist, reattributed to Perréal and assigned to the Musée de Moulins.

In 1963, Charles Sterling researched the work, removing the attribution to Perréal and instead assigned it to the Emilian Renaissance. He was also the first to link it back to Porcia (then thought to be a Saint Agnes or Virgin of the Annunciation from the circle of Lorenzo di Credi or of Franciabigio), which Sterling happened to have seen at the Istituto Centrale del Restauro in Rome.

Minerva was reassigned yet again to a Florentine painter in 1967, the same year as it was moved to the Louvre's stores. It formed part of an exhibition in 1982, for which Sylvie Béguin reattributed it to Fra Bartolomeo's youth. However, it to took until its inclusion in the Il Giardino di San Marco exhibition in 1992 for this attribution to be definitively confirmed.

== Description and style ==
The goddess Minerva appears in a niche, showing her attributes, the helmet, the classical armor, the spear and the shield decorated with the Medusa, as well as the sword tied to her belt. The painting was believed to be part of a series dedicated to illustrious women, perhaps destined to decorate a room of a private palace.

The figure takes a step forward, towards the viewer, coming out of the niche. The composition is very balanced, with an accentuated sense of the volume of the figure, obtained through glazes and chromatic combinations of great finesse, referable to the painter's early youthful phase.
