= Porcius =

Porcius can refer to:

- Members of the ancient Roman gens Porcia
- Florian Porcius (1816–1907), a Romanian botanist

== See also ==
- Porcia (disambiguation)
