= Feldsberg Castle =

Castle ruins in Austria

- Lurnfeld
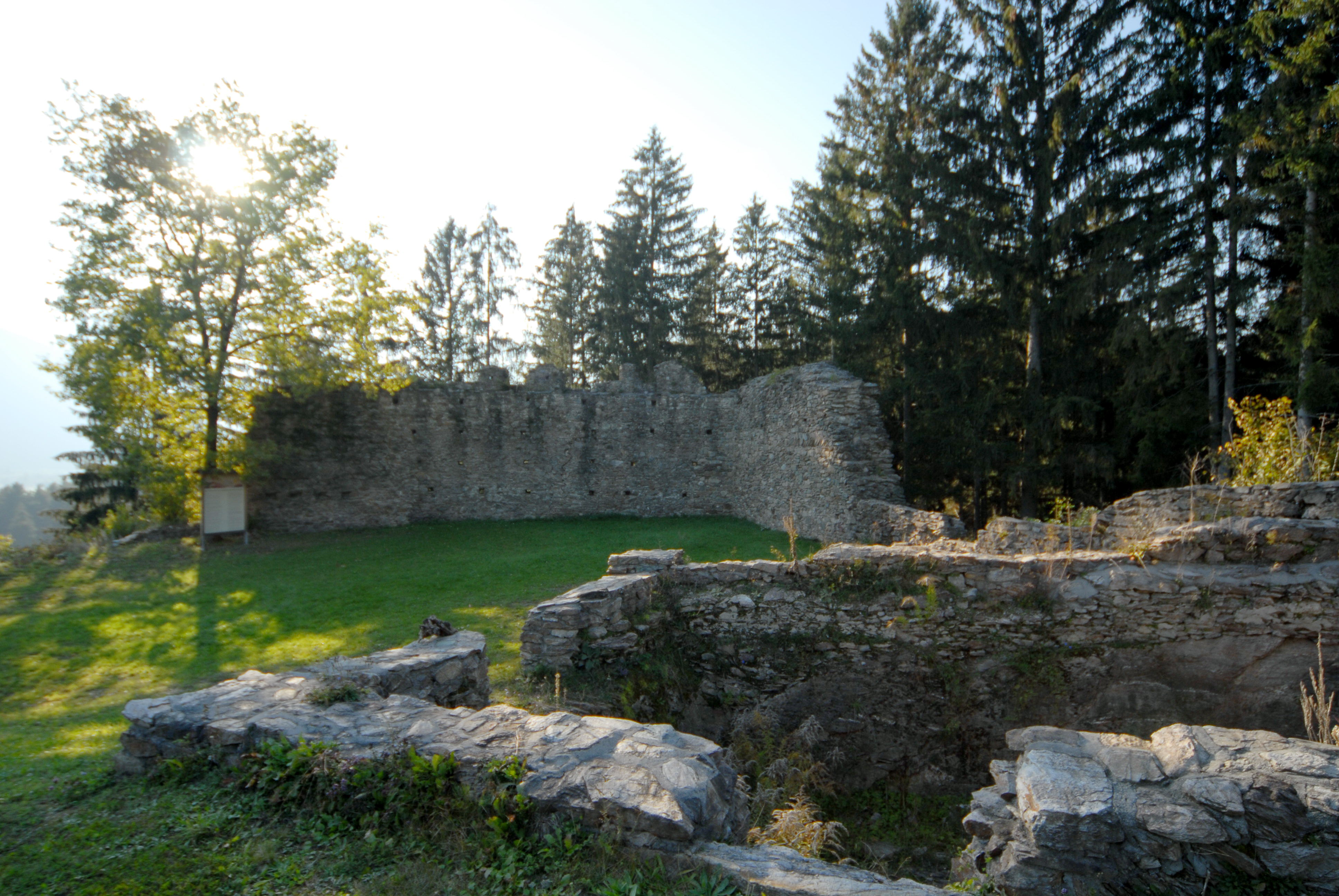
- Ruine Feldsberg

Site information
- Type: hill castle
- Code: AT-2
- Condition: Ruins, seriously dilapidated

Location
- Location within Austria
- Coordinates: 46°50′28″N 13°23′42″E

Garrison information
- Occupants: ministeriales

Feldsberg Castle (Burgruine Feldsberg) is a ruined castle in Carinthia, Austria. Its ruins are situated on a wooded hilltop west of Pusarnitz in the municipality of Lurnfeld near Spittal an der Drau.

== Description ==
The simple Romanesque fortification has fallen into disrepair. Feldsberg has an irregular quadrangular ground plan, following the terrain of the hill plateau. There are only the low remains of a tower in the form of a cone of rubble. On the north and west side there are walls, still up to 8 metres high, with herringbone masonry (opus spicatum). Access was via the south-east side. A buried cistern is indicated by a circular depression in the north angle.

== History ==
The predecessor of Feldsberg Castle was the Hohenburg Castle above Feldsberg.

The first documented mention was in 1189 by Hainricus de Veldisberc, a Salzburg ministerialis. Feldsberg Castle was a bone of contention in disputes between the Counts of Gorizia and the Archbishopric of Salzburg. In 1460, some of the negotiations for the Treaty of Pusarnitz were conducted here.

The castle may have been in a state of decay since the end of the 16th century, after jurisdiction had been transferred from Feldsberg to Sachsenburg. The last caretaker is documented for the year 1586, in 1658 the building was already described as a ruin.

== See also ==
- List of castles in Austria
