= St. Martin-Karlsbach =

Sankt Martin-Karlsbach
- Municipality
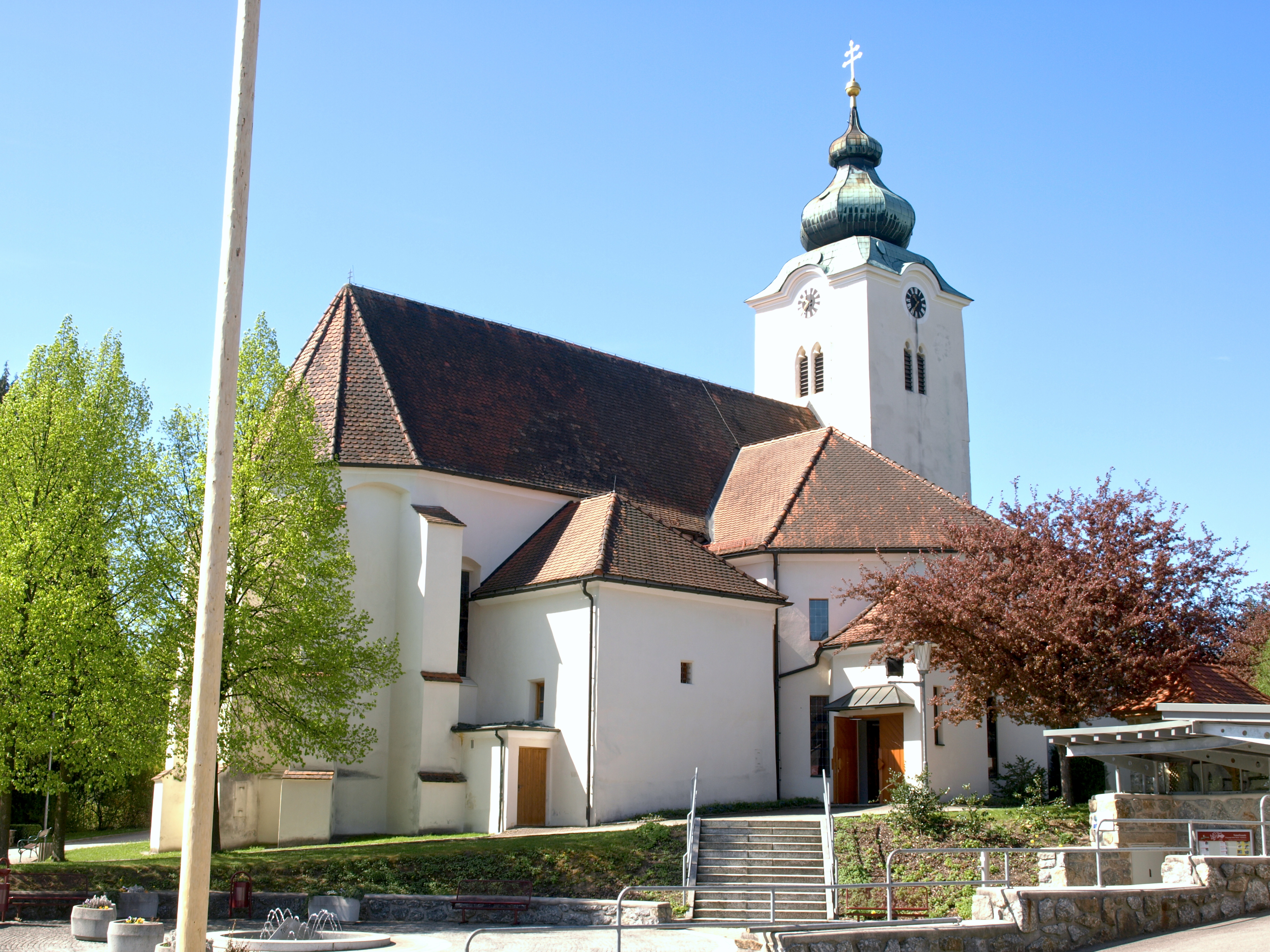
- Sankt Martin am Ybbsfelde parish church

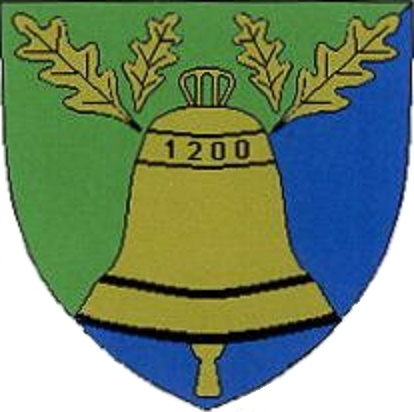
- Coat of arms

- Location within Austria
- Coordinates: 48°10′N 15°1′E
- Country: Austria
- State: Lower Austria
- District: Melk

Government
  - Mayor: Josef Ritzmaier

Area
  - Total: 24.91 km^{2} (9.62 sq mi)
- Elevation: 312 m (1,024 ft)

Population (2018-01-01)
  - Total: 1,659
  - Density: 66.60/km^{2} (172.5/sq mi)
- Time zone: UTC+1 (CET)
  - Summer (DST): UTC+2 (CEST)
- Postal code: 3371
- Area code: 07412
- Website: www.stmartin-karlsbach.com

Sankt Martin-Karlsbach is a town in the district of Melk in the Austrian state of Lower Austria.

== Population ==
Historical population
Year	Pop.	±%
1971	1,435	—
1981	1,535	+7.0%
1991	1,702	+10.9%
2001	1,728	+1.5%
