= Lurnfeld =

- Municipality
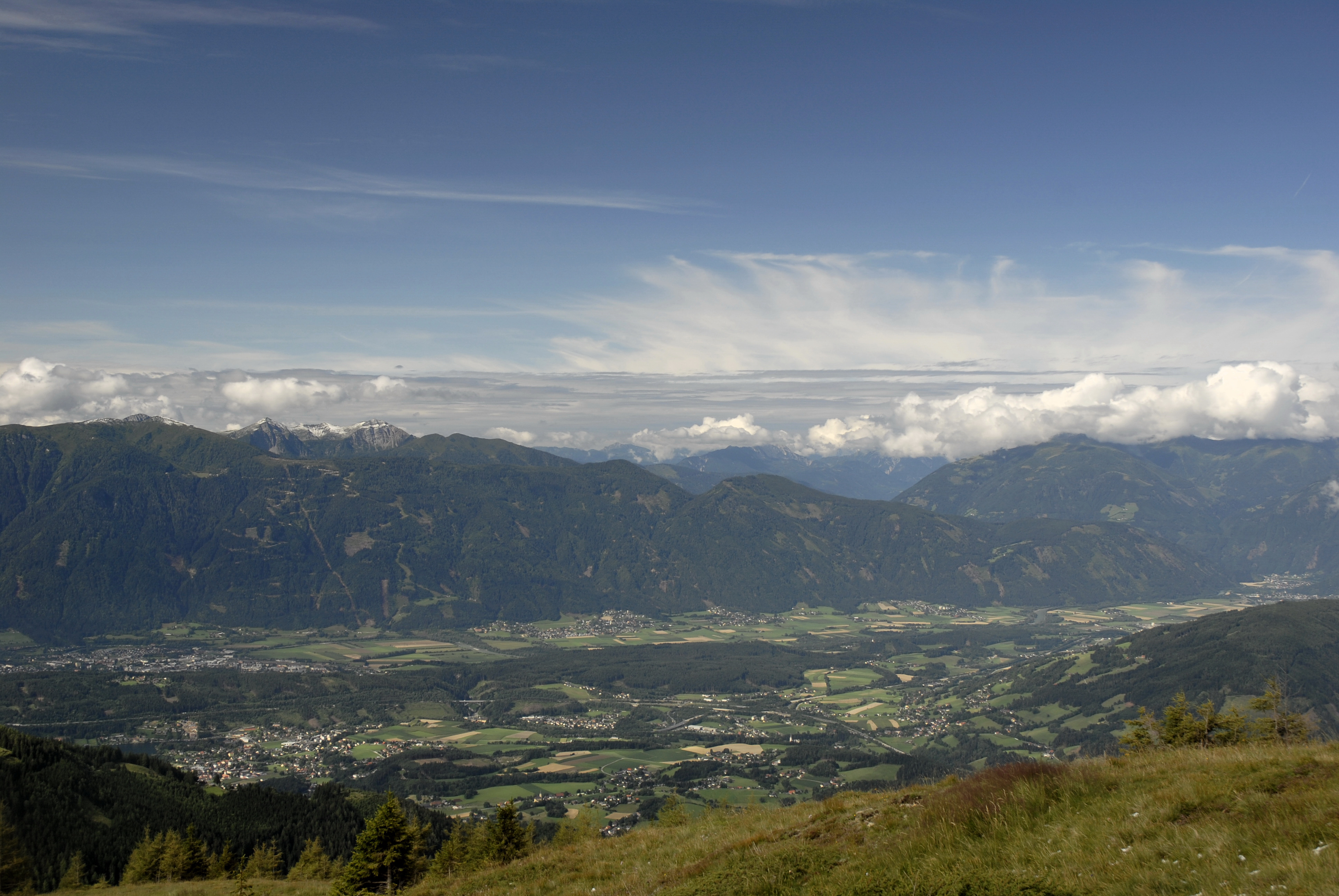
- View across the Lurnfeld valley

- Coat of arms

- Location within Austria
- Coordinates: 46°50′N 13°22′E
- Country: Austria
- State: Carinthia
- District: Spittal an der Drau

Government
  - Mayor: Rudolf Hartlieb (FPK)

Area
  - Total: 33.02 km^{2} (12.75 sq mi)
- Elevation: 557 m (1,827 ft)

Population (2018-01-01)
  - Total: 2,599
  - Density: 78.71/km^{2} (203.9/sq mi)
- Time zone: UTC+1 (CET)
  - Summer (DST): UTC+2 (CEST)
- Postal code: 9813
- Area code: 04769
- Website: www.lurnfeld.at

Lurnfeld is a market town in the district of Spittal an der Drau in the Austrian state of Carinthia. The municipality consists of the two Katastralgemeinden: Möllbrücke and Pusarnitz, comprising several small villages.

It is located within the eponymous valley of the Drava river, on the southern slope of the Ankogel Group of the Hohe Tauern range, west of the district's capital Spittal an der Drau. At Möllbrücke is the confluence of the Drava with the Möll tributary. In the west the valley is confined by the mountains of the Kreuzeck group and in the south by the Gailtal Alps.

== History ==
The Lurnfeld valley around the Roman city of Teurnia is a very old settlement area, in ancient times called vallis Lurna. In an 891 deed mentioned as Liburnia, it became the centre of the Upper Carinthian counts in the mediæval Lurngau, who resided at Hohenburg Castle. Their dominions then stretched from west of Villach up the Drava to Lienz and the Tyrolean border.

Pusarnitz already appeared in a 1072 deed. After the Counts of Lurn became extinct in 1135, it was among the Carinthian possessions of the Salzburg archbishops. The remaining estates were inherited by the Counts of Ortenburg, while the Tyrolean Meinhardiner dynasty, Counts of Görz since 1127, expanded their possessions in the west. The main village Möllbrücke was first mentioned as mölnprukke in 1253. In 1307 it was denoted as a possession of the Meinhardiner counts of Görz and seat of a county court.

When the Carinthian counts of Ortenburg became extinct in 1418, their estates were bequested to the Counts of Celje. Count Ulrich II was even elevated to a Prince of the Holy Roman Empire by the Emperor Sigismund, but left no heirs when he was killed by his bitter rival Ladislaus Hunyadi in 1456. He had signed an inheritance treaty with the Habsburg emperor Frederick III, also Duke of Carinthia since 1424. However, the Meinhardiner count John II of Görz also claimed the former Ortenburg dominions. He marched against Carinthia from his Tyrolean residence at Bruck Castle, crossing the border at Oberdrauburg and occupying Spittal to lay siege to the Ortenburg fortress. He was finally defeated in 1460 and had to sign the Treaty of Pusarnitz at episcopal Feldsberg Castle, whereby he renounced all Carinthian estates in favour of the Austrian House of Habsburg.

== Politics ==
The Lurnfeld municipality was created by the merger of Möllbrücke, Pusarnitz and neighbouring Sachsenburg in 1973; the citizens of Sachsenburg decided to split off again in 1992.

Seats in the municipal assembly (Gemeinderat) as of 2009 elections:

- Freedom Party in Carinthia (FPK): 10
- Social Democratic Party of Austria (SPÖ): 6
- Austrian People's Party (ÖVP): 2
- Greens: 1

== Gallery ==
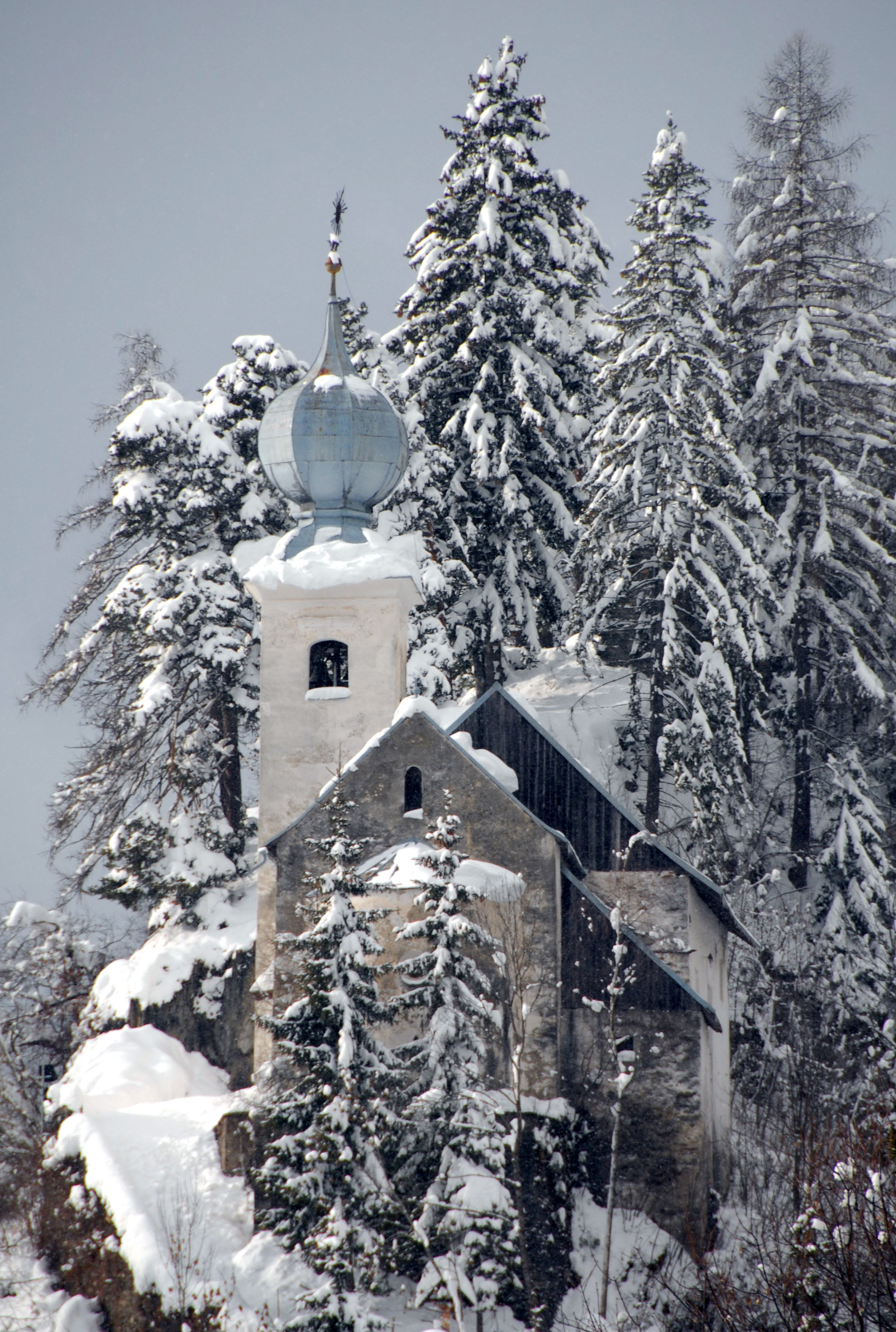
St Maria in Hohenburg pilgrimage church

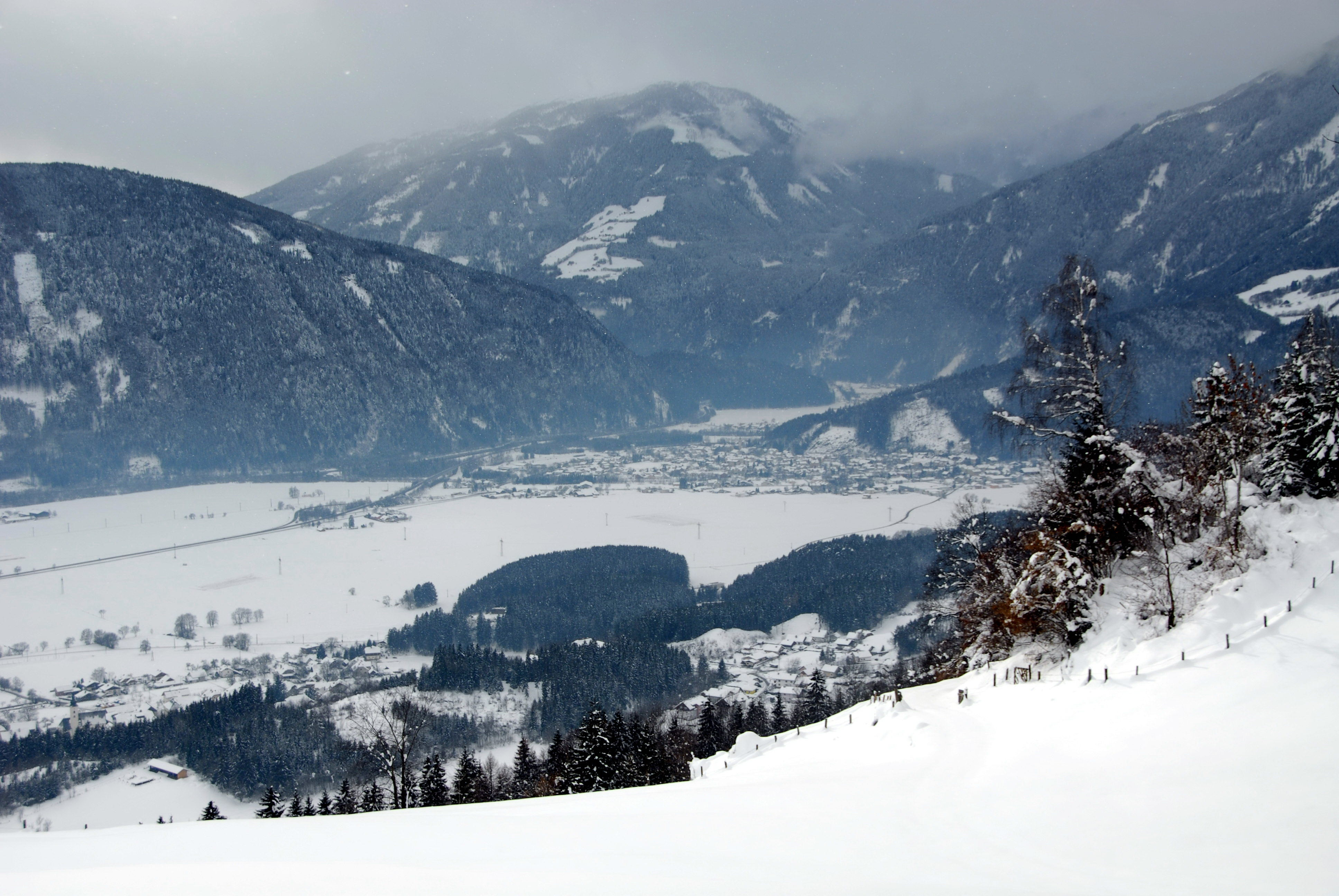
Moellbruecke with "Hoher Stand" mountain in the background

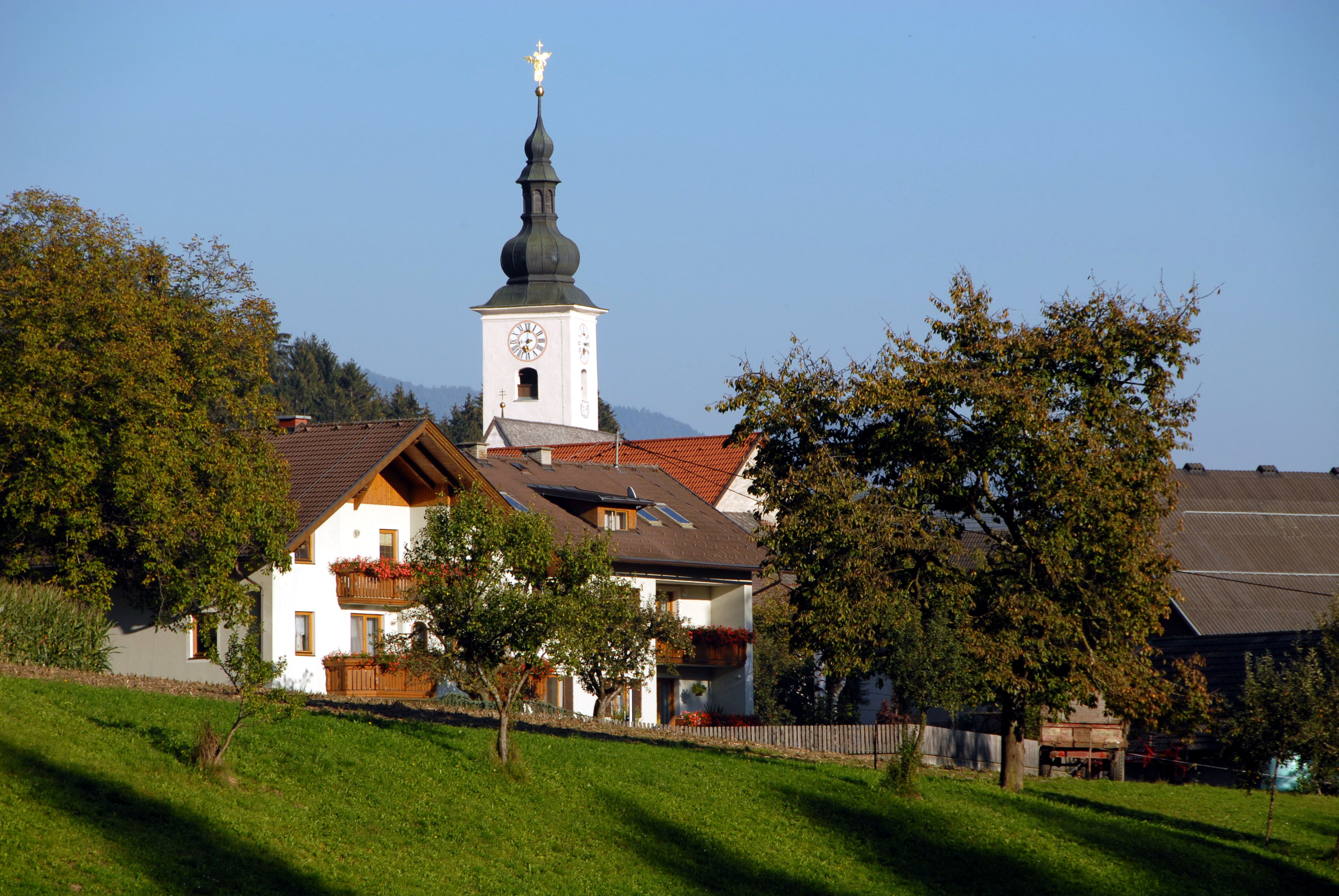
Pusarnitz in the community of Lurnfeld

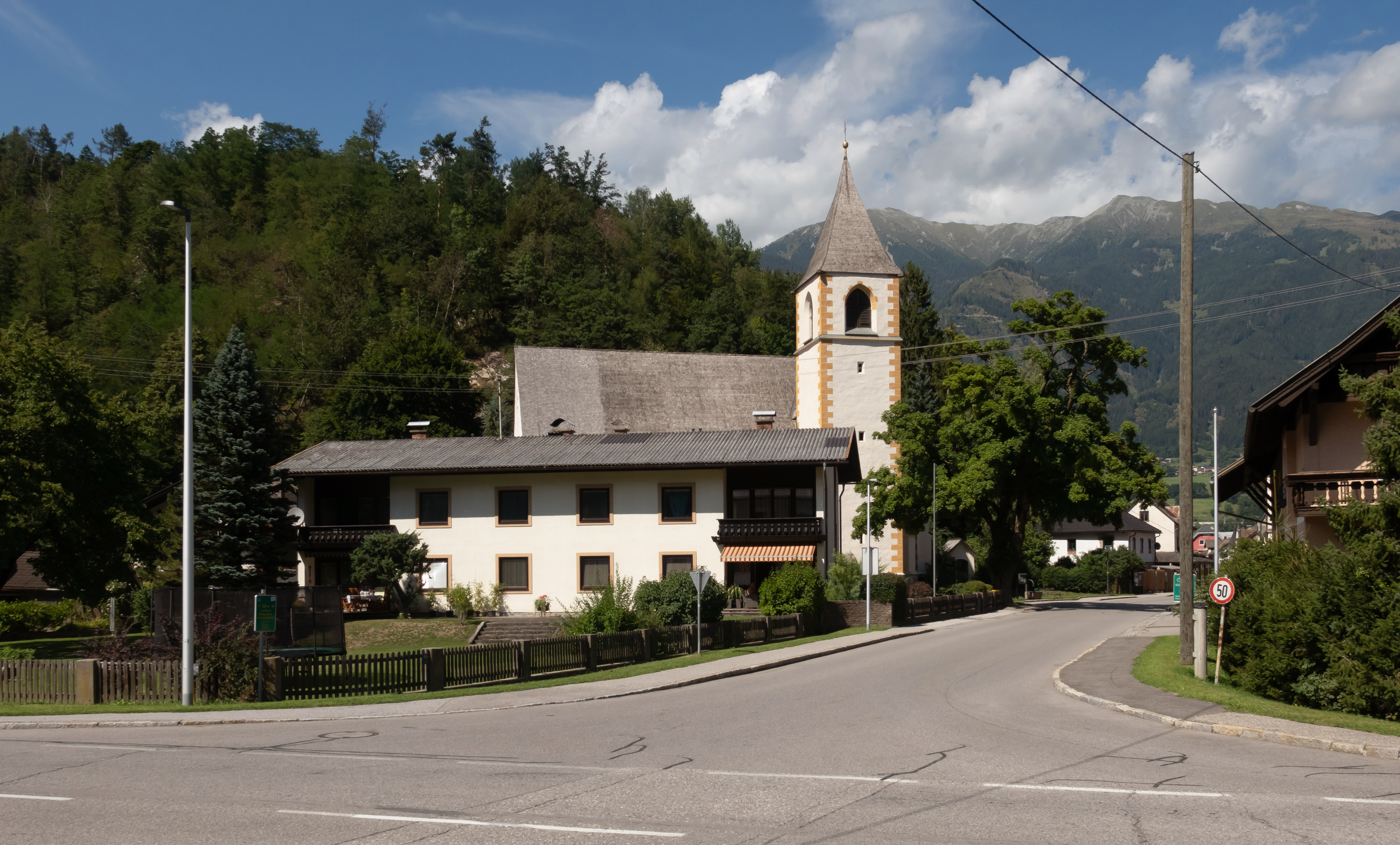
Möllbrücke, church: Pfarrkirche Sankt Leonhard

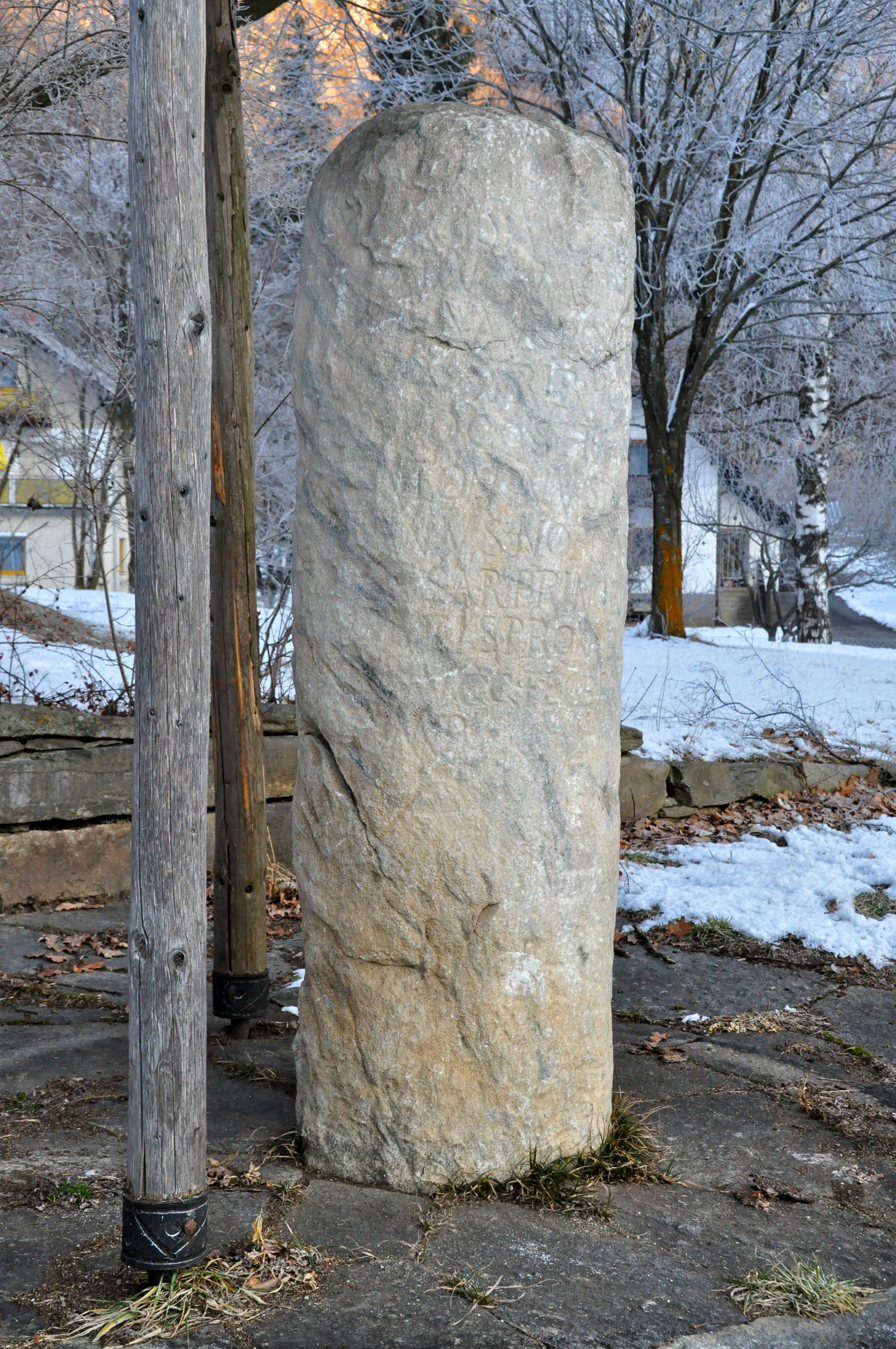
Roman milestone near Moellbruecke

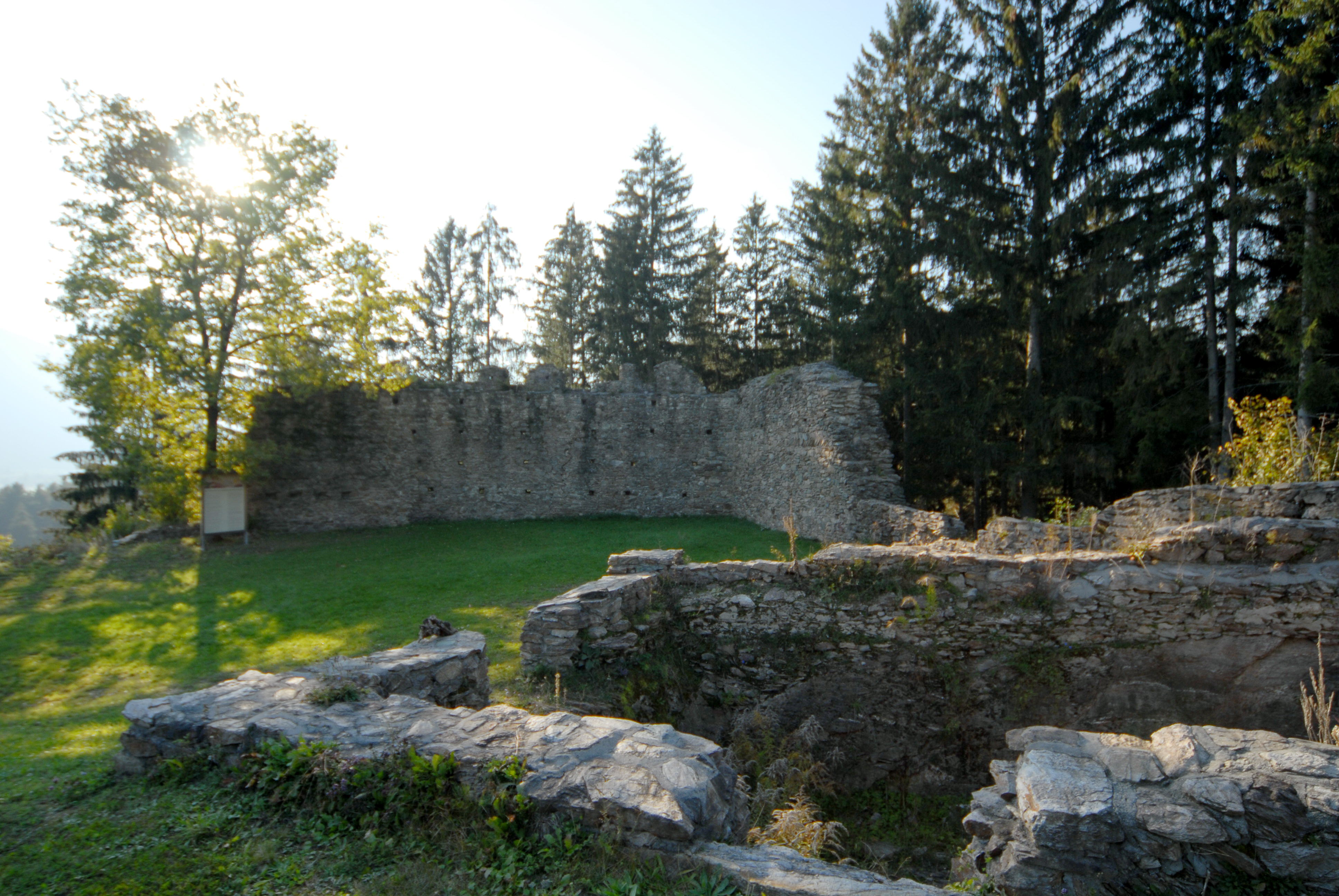
Ruin of Feldsberg castle

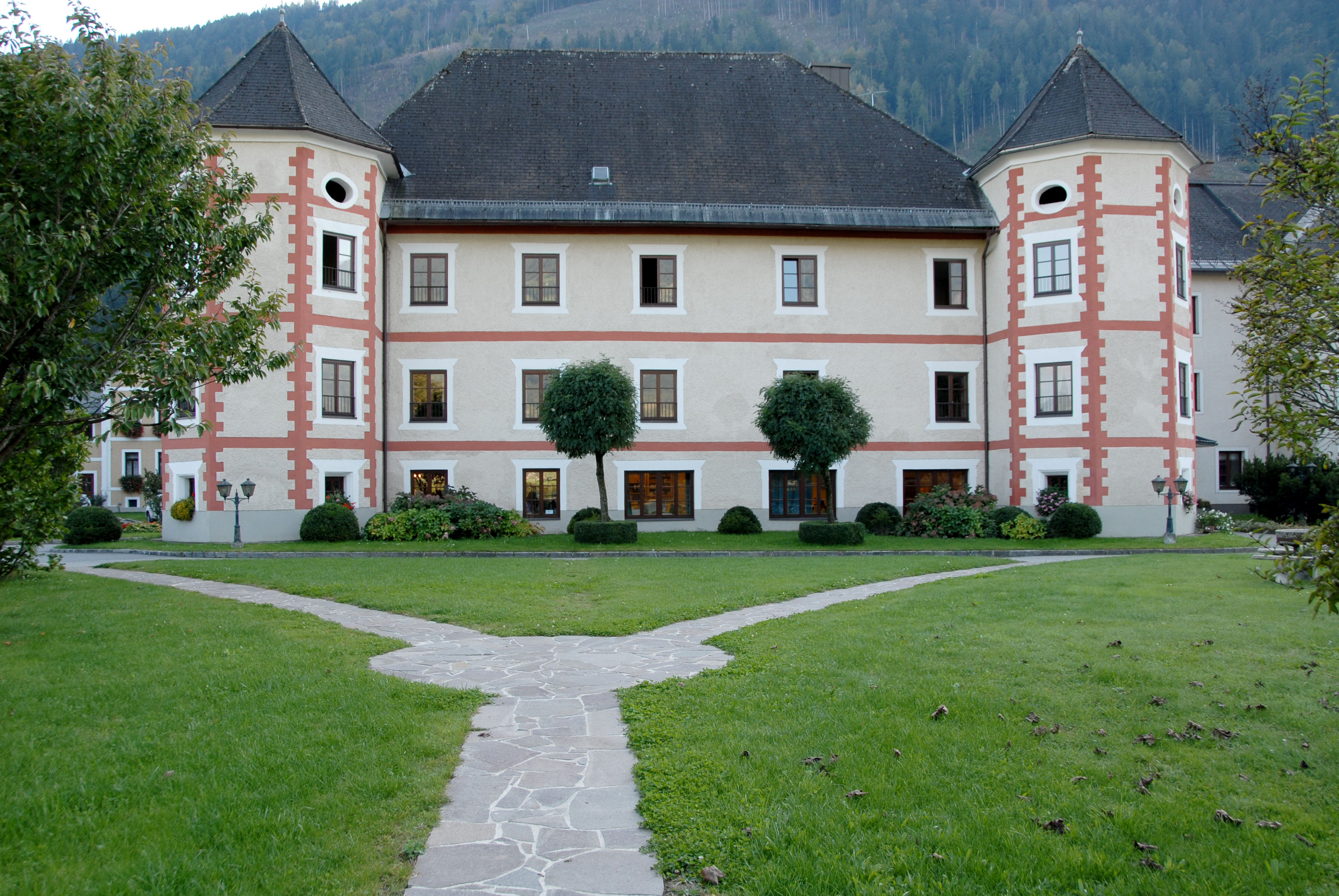
Drauhofen castle
