= Gabriel von Salamanca-Ortenburg =

Spanish nobleman (1489–1539)

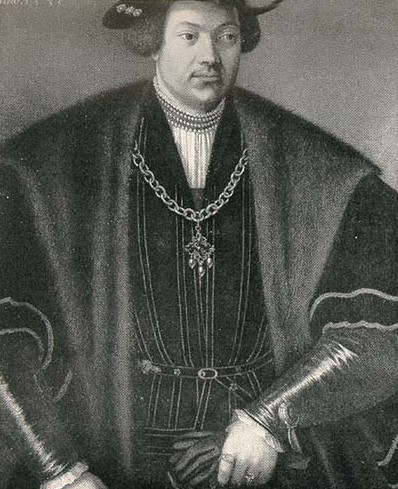
Gabriel von Salamanca, Count of Ortenburg

Gabriel von Salamanca (1489 – 12 December 1539) was a Spanish nobleman who served as general treasurer and archchancellor of the Habsburg archduke (and future Emperor) Ferdinand I of Austria from 1521 to 1526. He was elevated to a Count of Ortenburg in 1524.

== Life ==
Descending from a wealthy merchant family in Burgos, Castile, Gabriel von Salamanca in 1514 was already chancellor under the Habsburg emperor Maximilian I, who had forged an alliance with King Ferdinand II of Aragon and Queen Isabella I of Castile by marrying his son Philip the Handsome off to their daughter Joanna.

In this period Salamanca made friends with Maximilian's grandson Archduke Ferdinand I, who after the emperor's death in 1519 received the Habsburg hereditary lands of Austria with the duchies of Styria, Carinthia and Carniola (then called Inner Austria) as well as Tyrol and Further Austria from his elder brother Emperor Charles V in 1521. Gabriel acted as Ferdinand's treasurer and archchancellor; he was vital in providing the Habsburg dynasty with access to loans by the Fugger family. His economic measures, however, ultimately failed as his purported self-serving manners met with fierce opposition by the Austrian and Tyrolean aristocracy, who called him an "archarian Jew" and "stinking heretic".

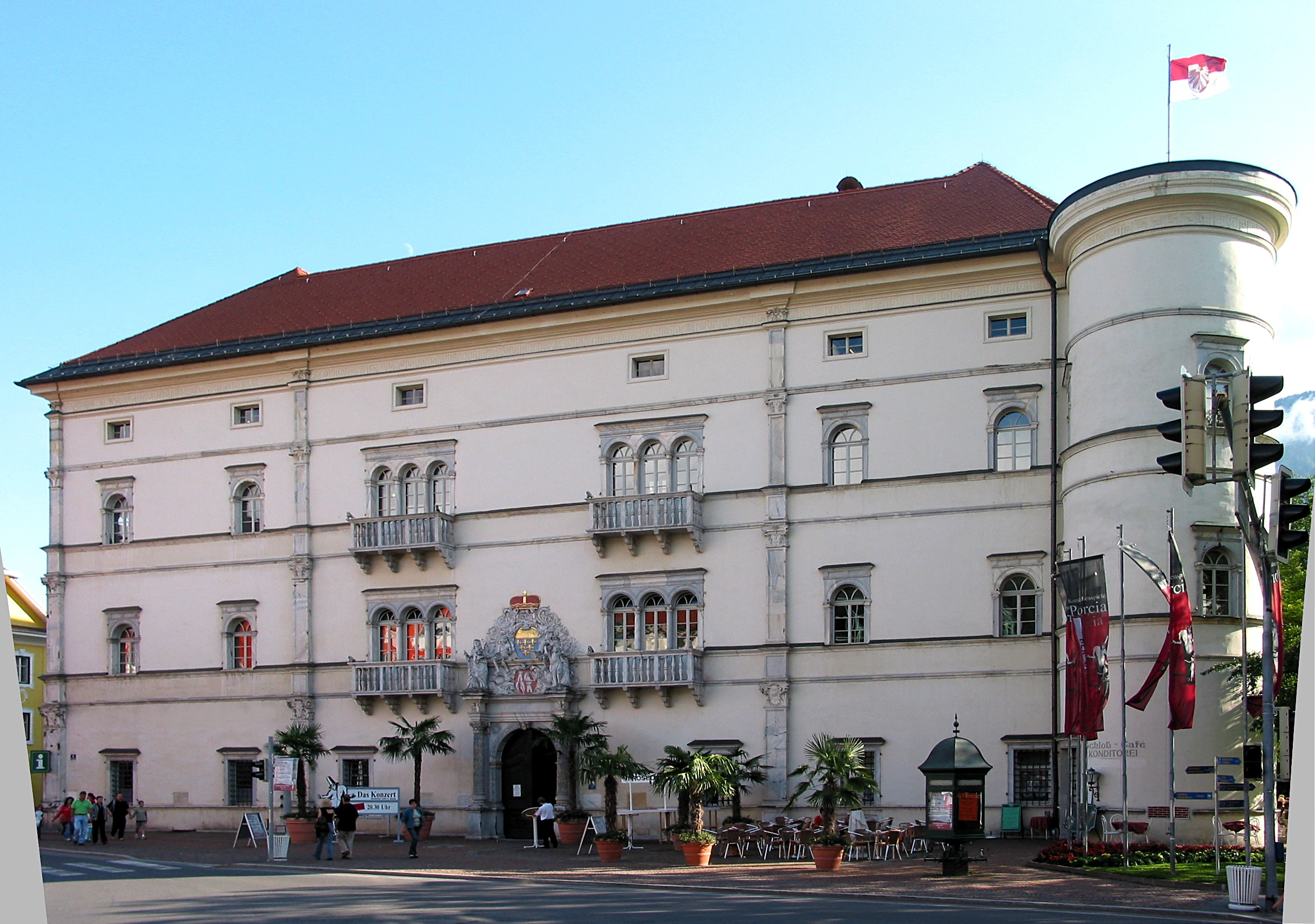
Porcia Castle, built by Count Gabriel von Salamanca-Ortenburg in 1533

In 1523 he was elevated to the rank of an Imperial Freiherr (Baron) and Lord of Ehrenberg Castle in Tyrol as well as of Freyenstein and Karlsbach in Austria. On 10 March 1524 he further received the possessions of the extinct Counts of Ortenburg in Carinthia, which were last held by Count Ulrich II of Celje, together with the Ortenburg comital title, which earned him the enmity of the Bavarian Ortenburg dynasty.

As early as in 1526, he was forced to resign from his positions, and was succeeded by Bishop Bernardo Clesio. Salamanca nevertheless remained a close advisor of the archduke and was able to maintain his fiefs; he took his residence at Spittal an der Drau in Carinthia, where he had a luxuriant Renaissance palace built by Italian architects from 1533, today known as Schloss Porcia. Salamanca, however, did not live to see it completed. In compensation for the loss of his offices he had received the Habsburg bailiwick of Ensisheim in Alsace, where he died in 1539.

== The Salamanca family ==
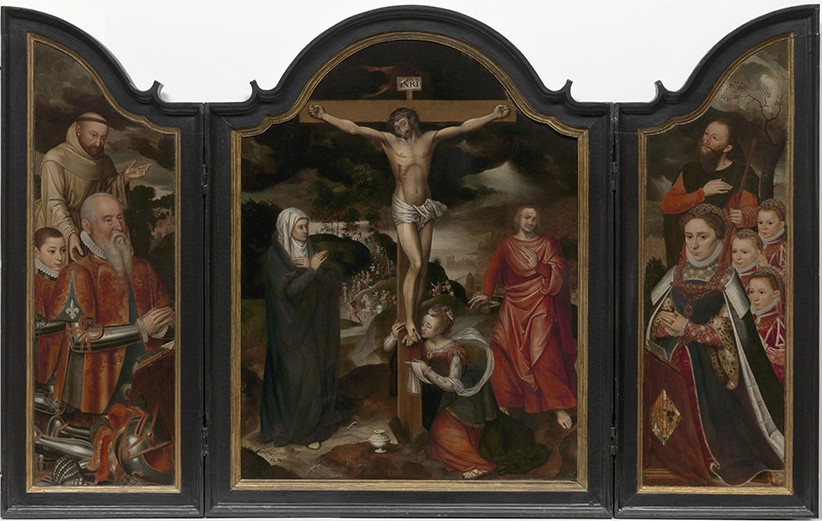
Francisco de Salamanca and his wife Josine Pardo in "The Salamanca triptych", Pieter Claeissens The Elder (1567)

Gabriel von Salamanca was the son of Gonzalo de Salamanca, a wealthy merchant from Burgos, and Isabel de Ayala and had two brothers:

Alonso de Salamanca, who married Ana de Polanco Maluenda and was father to Miguel de Salamanca Polanco (c. 1500-1571), a successful merchant and mayor of Burgos, Jeronimo de Salamanca Polanco, a banker and treasurer of Isabella of Austria, Francisco de Salamanca Polanco (1503–1589), a captain and a knight, who married Josine Pardo; and Francisco de Salamanca, regent of Galicia who married Clara de Manzuelo, parents to Garcia de Salamanca (1516–1567).

All of his nephews went into business together and formed the Salamanca-Polanco trading company, which became at the time one of the most powerful and richest international trading companies in Europe. His uncle Pedro de Salamanca (c. 1450–1529), was an ambassador of the Catholic Monarchs in London, and later prior of the Spanish Council or Nation in Bruges.

His family relatives in Bruges resided in the 16th century in the palace La Casa Negra in the street Spanjaardstraat and built their Chapel of the Pieta in the Church of the Augustinians in Bruges, which disappeared at the end of the 16th century and only the artwork survives. In Burgos, the Salamanca-Polanco family had the Chapel of the Salamancas in the Church of San Lesmes as well as the Chapel of Santo Domingo in the Convent of San Pablo.

== Marriage ==
Gabriel was married twice:

- first, at the instigation of Archduke Ferdinand, to Countess Elisabeth of Eberstein (died c. 1330) on 27 July 1523;
- second in 1533 to Elisabeth of Baden (1516–1568), a daughter of Margrave Ernst of Baden-Durlach and Elisabeth of Brandenburg-Ansbach-Kulmbach.

Both marriages produced no children.
