= Herrengasse 23 (Bern) =

Historic building in Bern, Switzerland

Coordinates: 46.94694°N 7.44948°E

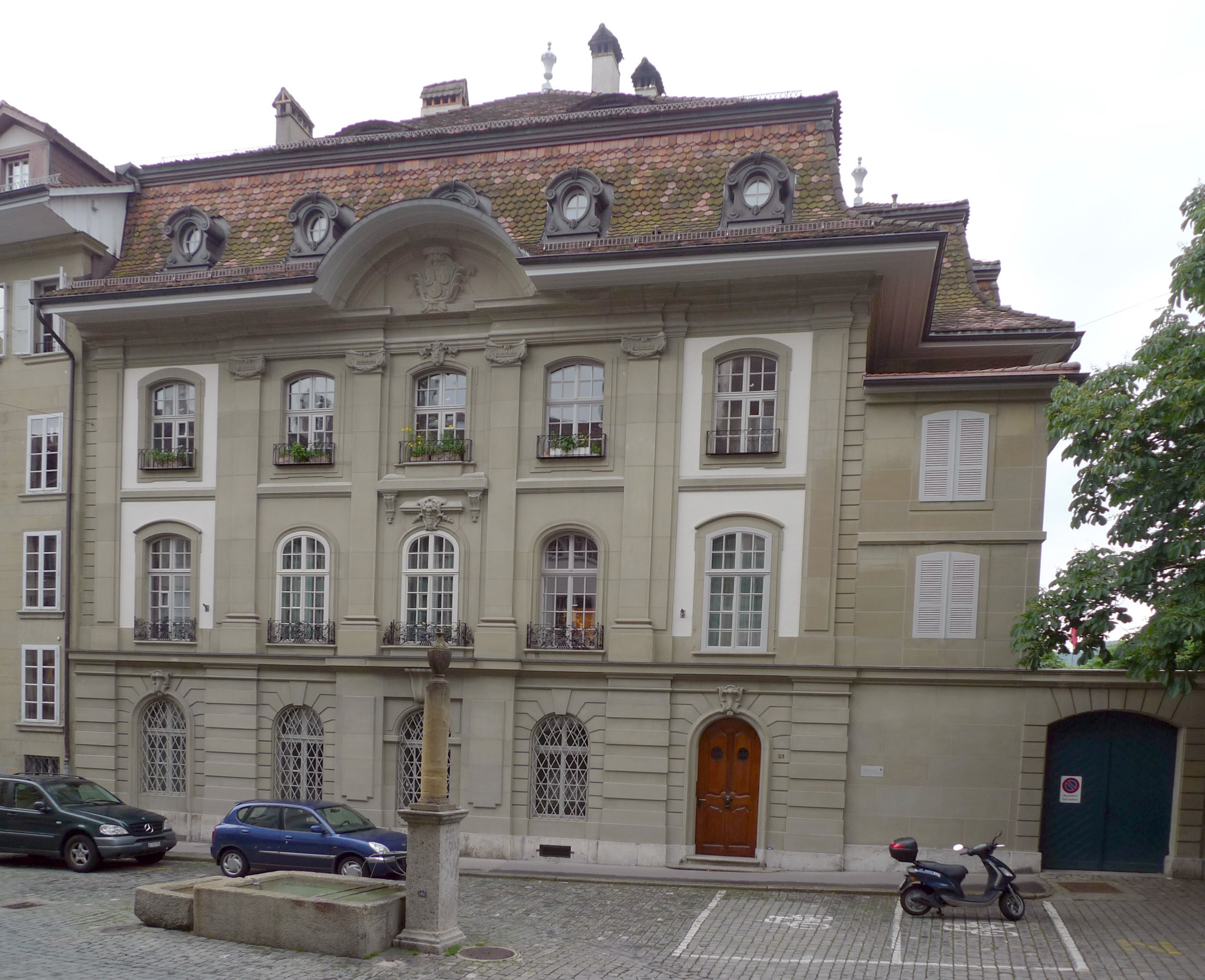
The north façade of Herrengasse 23

The von Wattenwyl house on Herrengasse 23 is a historic building in Bern, Switzerland, named after the von Wattenwyl family who owned it for over 200 years.

The building was constructed during the Middle Ages, incorporating some older neighbouring properties; these can still seen in the eastern range of the house.

Over time, the house changed owners several times, and various design changes were effected. The first major reconstruction was in 1690, with further changes executed between 1730 and 1740. The most notable of these was made in 1760 by the eminent Bernese architect, Erasmus Ritter, for the building's then owner, David Salomon von Wattenwyl. A fountain by Ritter, in the form of a carved pillar surmounted by a vase, remains in front of the house.

== Early history ==
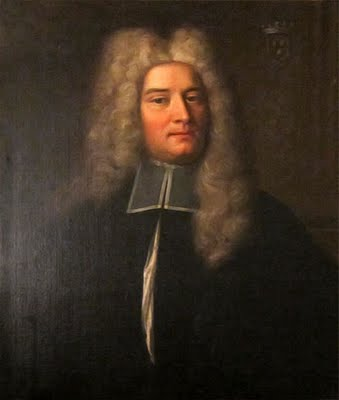
Philippe Albert de Büren (1678-1756), one of the earliest owners of Herrengasse 23

The house was created, from 1690, by a member of the de Büren family. This was achieved by amalgamating various neighbouring properties and it is from this period that some of the interiors remain. These interiors with delicate geometric panelling and plasterwork are considered to be some of the finest of the period in Bern. One of the more eminent members of this family and a resident of the house was Philippe Albert de Büren (1678–1756), a member of the Grand Council of Bern from 1710 and Governor of Morges from 1723; he employed the architect Paul Hofer to carry out further building work during the 1730s.

Philippe Albert de Büren entertained lavishly in the mansion; it is recorded that one occasion alone, he entertained the Princess of Hesse, who brought with her an entourage so great that it required 77 coaches, 50 carriages and 148 mules to transport it. The size of the entourage suggests that she was Princess Mary, the estranged wife of The Landgrave of Hesse-Cassel.

However, despite his high offices and marriages to wealthy women, de Büren was to be the last of his family to reside in the Herrengasse mansion. He died in penury in 1756. Subsequently, the house was sold to David Salomon von Wattenwyl, whose family are now that most associated with the mansion which David Salomon von Wattenwyl had rebuilt.

== Architectural appraisal ==
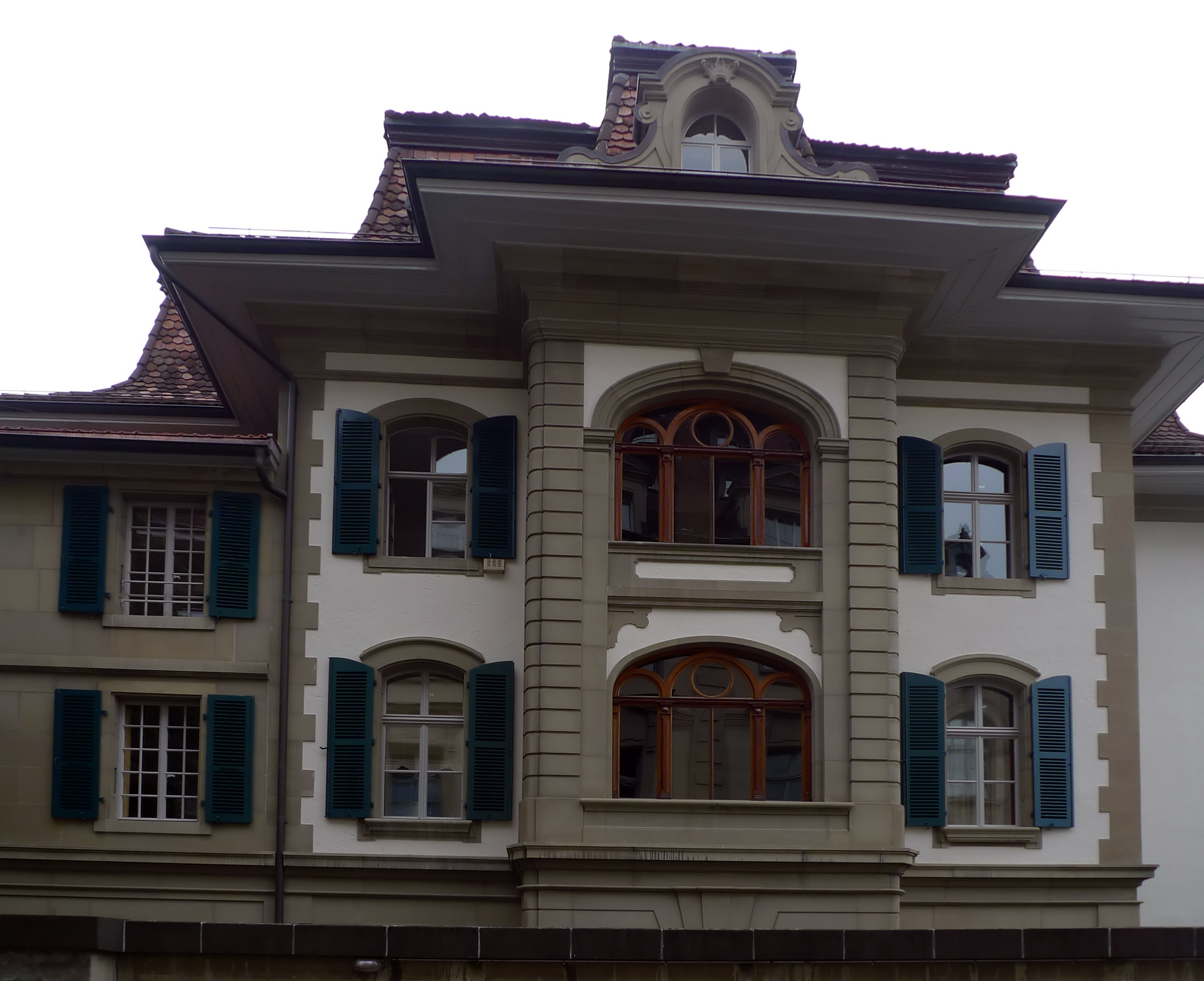
The western façade of Herrengasse 23

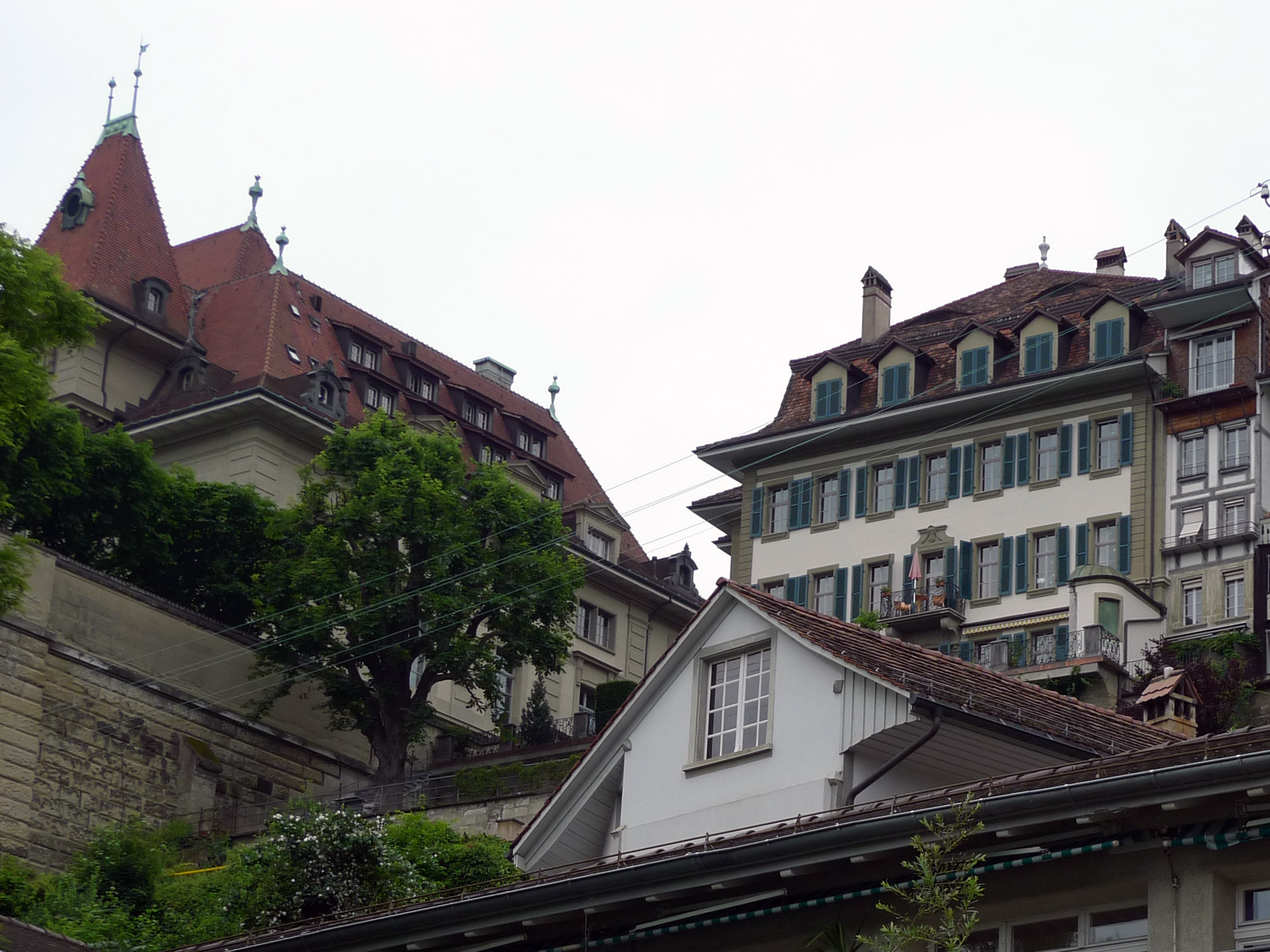
The southern façade of Herrengasse 23, seen from the level of the river Aar

The principal (northern) façade, seen today, of 23 Herrengrasse was designed by Erasmus Ritter shortly after 1756 for David Salomon von Wattenwyl, who had acquired the property that year. It is probable that the purpose of the new façade was to unify and disguise the various amalgamations and building work which had taken place over the preceding seventy years.

The architectural form selected was the classical North European Baroque style, typical of the period. The house is considered one of Ritter's most important works. The mansion comprises four floors, the uppermost being an attic in a steep mansard roof. The principal façade is of five bays. On the two floors just above the ground floor, each bay is divided by a shallow pilaster. The three central bays are given prominence by the addition of capitals to the central five pilasters. The two terminating bays at two floors above the ground floor are painted in a buff tint, contrasting with uniformity of the grey stone of the remainder of the façade; this again adds emphasis to the central three bays.

The ground floor is rusticated with a segmented casement window in each bay. The ground floor elevation is broken by seven shallow protrusions, these support each of the pilasters dividing the bays above. Unusually, the central bay does not contain the principal entrance, this is in the right-hand terminating bay.

On the next floor above, a piano nobile is suggested by the windows being slightly taller than the casements below and above. The three central windows, adorned with balconies, are segmented, while the two terminating windows have a less pronounced curve to their tops, this accentuates the slightly larger widths of the terminating bays are wider than the central. This rhythm is repeated on the floor above it. The house is dominated by a mansard roof, broken at its centre to contain the segmented pediment which provided focus and prominence to the central bay below. The pediment displays the coat of arms of the family who lived within. The severity of the mansard is relieved by four oculus windows; these are placed above each of the bays flanking the central bay.

Baroque ornament on the façade is chaste, and is confined to keystones above windows, a sculpted relief swag above the central window of the piano nobile, the capitals of the central pilasters and the coat of arms within the pediment.

== Notable residents ==
=== Bernhard Friedrich von Wattenwyl ===
The Wattenwyl family owned the house for two centuries. The most notable Wattenwyl occupant of the house was Bernhard Friedrich von Wattenwyl, born in Bern in 1801. He received a high quality education in Bern and Paris and later, traveled widely as a professional advocate.

As a result of the French July Revolution, Switzerland's Liberal Government experienced a period of political instability. and Bernhard Friedrich enlisted 200 to 300 volunteers to defend the city from the attack. He then left Bern for Canton of Schwyz. After an attempt by the conservatives of Schwyz to overthrow the liberal government of Lucerne has failed, Bernhard Friedrich was arrested. However, before his trial, he fled to Lake Como, and then to Nice. Following a few years spent in Geneva, he returned to Bern in 1844. Wattenwyl died in 1881.

=== Allen Dulles ===
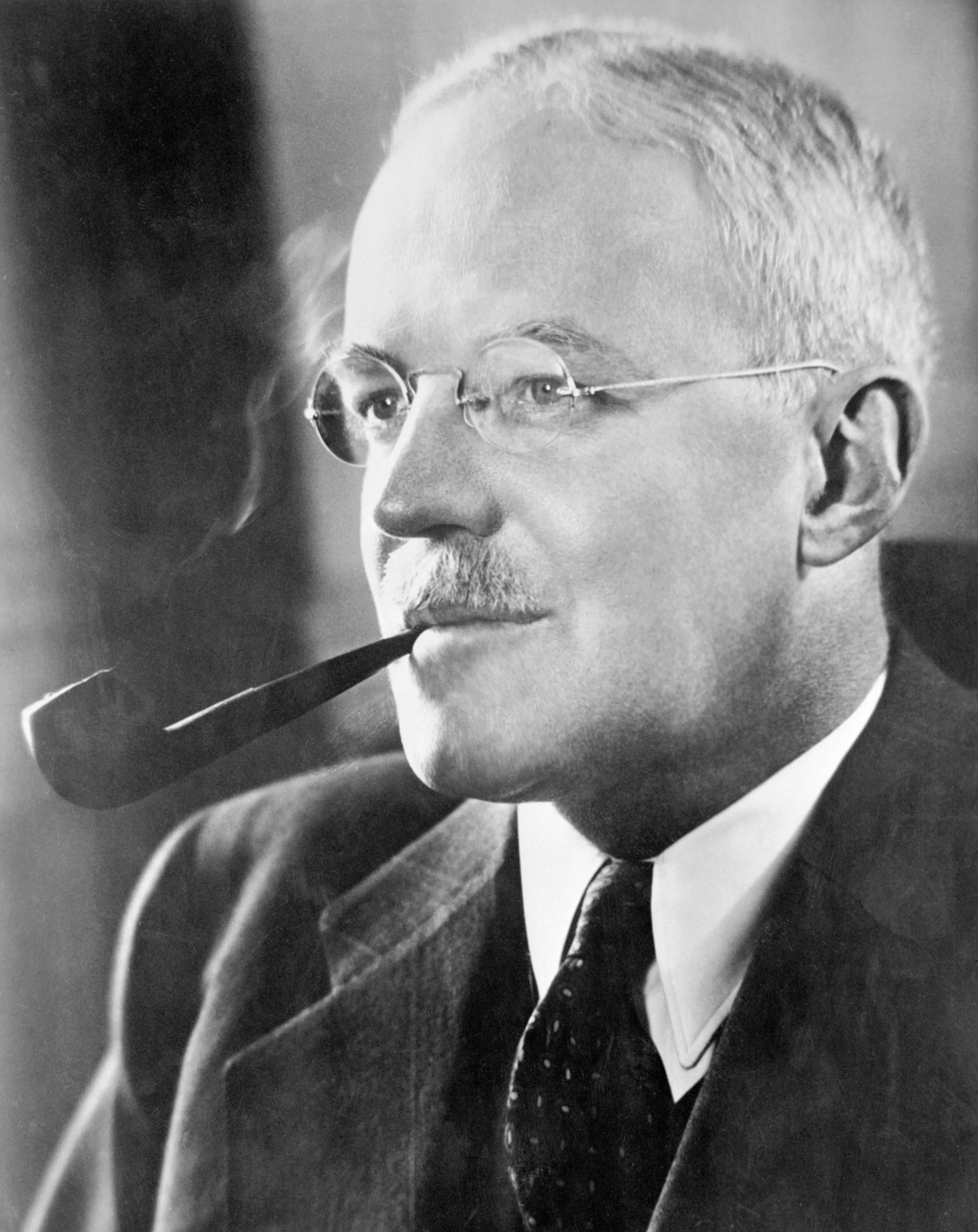
Allen Dulles

In 1930, 23 Herrengasse was divided into letting apartments. In 1942, the ground-floor apartment was rented by an American, Allen Dulles, who had arrived in November 1942, to head the OSS Switzerland field station. Officially he was assigned as a special assistant to the minister, but his real task, as he wrote later was “to gather information about the Nazi and Fascist enemy and quietly render such support and encouragement as I could to the resistance forces working against the Nazis and Fascists in the areas adjacent to Switzerland which were under the rule of Hitler or Mussolini”.

To allay suspicions, a sign at the apartment's door stated: "Allen W. Dulles, Special Assistant to the American Minister." It was, however, the rear and more discreet entrance to the property that was most convenient to Dulles. By this entrance, guests were able to come and go unnoticed. Dulles was also able to use his influence to have the street lights outside the property turned off to assist the secrecy of his visitors. Guests included spies, traitors, refugees, priests, exiles and expatriates, anyone who could provide him with intelligence. One visitor was Prince Max Egon zu Hohenlohe-Langenburg, a special agent of Himmler.

From his house on Herrengasse Dulles ran an intelligence organization that produced information on Nazi aircraft, V-1 and V-2 missiles, the 20 July 1944 attempt to kill Adolf Hitler, and even the surrender of German troops in Italy.

== Later history ==
In the fall of 1953 the house was offered for sale by the widow of Erich Wattenwyl. It was sold to the city for 1,300,000 francs on 1 February 1954. The price was considered to be very high, but was influenced by its location of the house with close proximity to the casino and the city library as well as the fine architecture.

Over the centuries the house has undergone many renovations and changed its appearance many times and today it remains, as in the time of Allen Dulles, a building of let apartments. It was fully renovated in 1982. However, it is only since 1906 that it has been possible to view Ritter's Baroque façade unencumbered. Before that time, neighbouring buildings in various architectural styles prevented a full perspective, none more so than an adjoining grammar school with a projecting turret staircase which obscured part of the façade. This was demolished in 1906.

== Bibliography ==
- Caviezel, Zita; Herzog, Georges; Keller, Jürg A. (2006), Basel-Landschaft, Basel-Stadt, Bern, Solothurn, Kunstführer durch die Schweiz, vol. 3 (1st ed.), Bern: Gesellschaft für Schweizerische Kunstgeschichte, p. 204, ISBN 3-906131-97-1
- Hofer, Paul (1959), Die Stadt Bern. Gesellschaftshäuser und Wohnbauten, Kunstdenkmäler des Kantons Bern, vol. 2, Basel: Gesellschaft für Schweizerische Kunstgeschichte / Verlag Birkhäuser, pp. 116–225, ISBN 3-906131-13-0, archived from the original on 2016-03-04
- The de Buren Family Retrieved 15 June 2010.
