= Komödienspiele Porcia =

Coordinates: 46°47′52″N 13°29′44″E

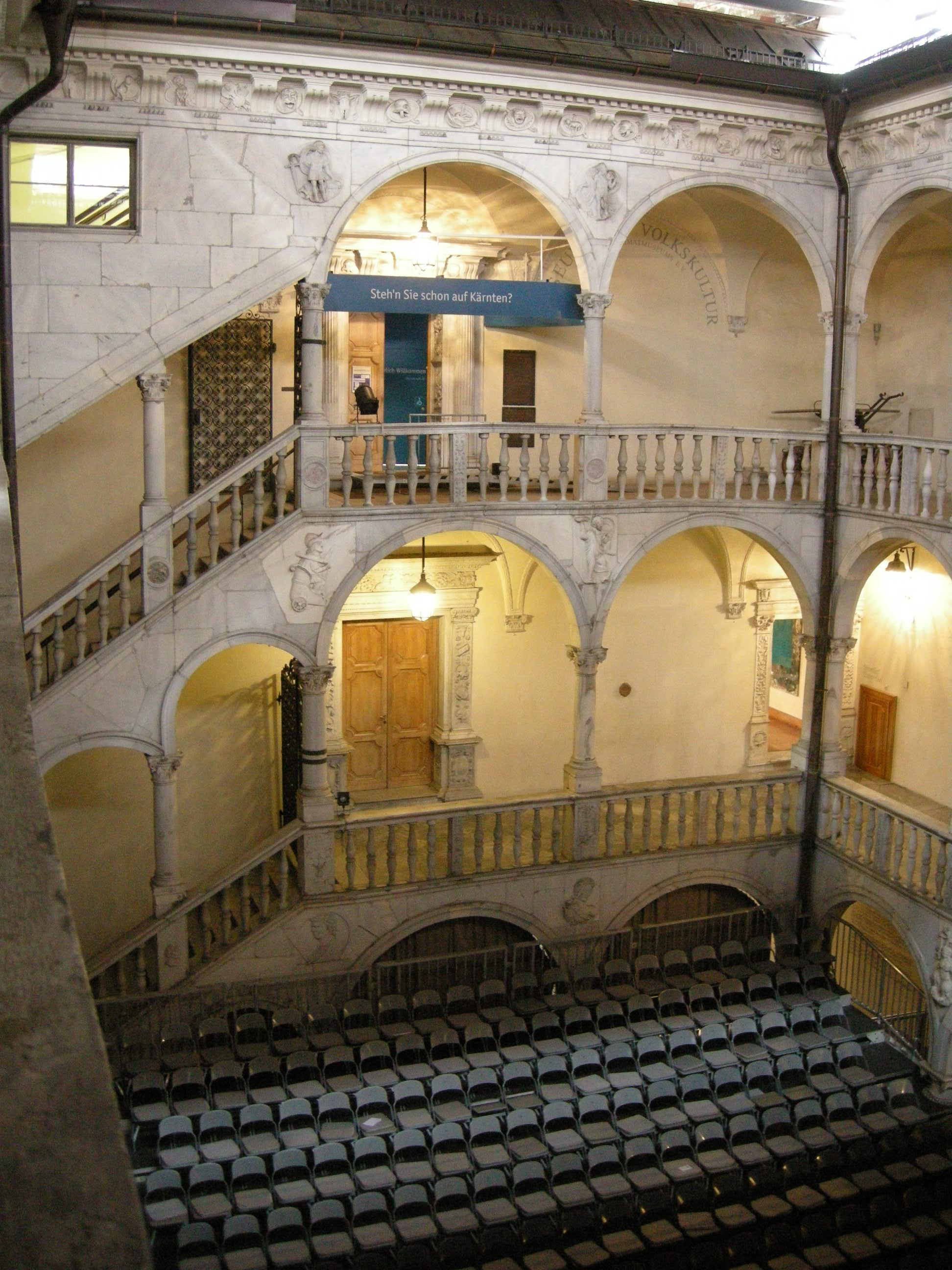
Porcia Castle, courtyard

Komödienspiele Porcia is an annual festival of drama in the tradition of the commedia dell'arte. It is held each summer at Porcia Castle in the Austrian town of Spittal an der Drau, Carinthia.

After a group of Viennese dramatists around Thomas Bernhard and H. C. Artmann had discovered the Renaissance courtyard of Porcia Castle for theatre performances, the festival opened in 1961 with an enactment of Shakespeare's The Comedy of Errors. Since then, the festival has been held each summer in July and August. Stagings included notable guest appearances, as from Fritz Muliar, Erika Pluhar, Karlheinz Hackl, and Heidelinde Weis. The ensemble's productions are regularly recorded by the national ORF broadcaster.
