= Burgruine Hohenburg auf Rosenberg =

Castle ruins in Austria

Coordinates: 46°51′08″N 13°24′30″E

- Pusarnitz, Lurnfeld
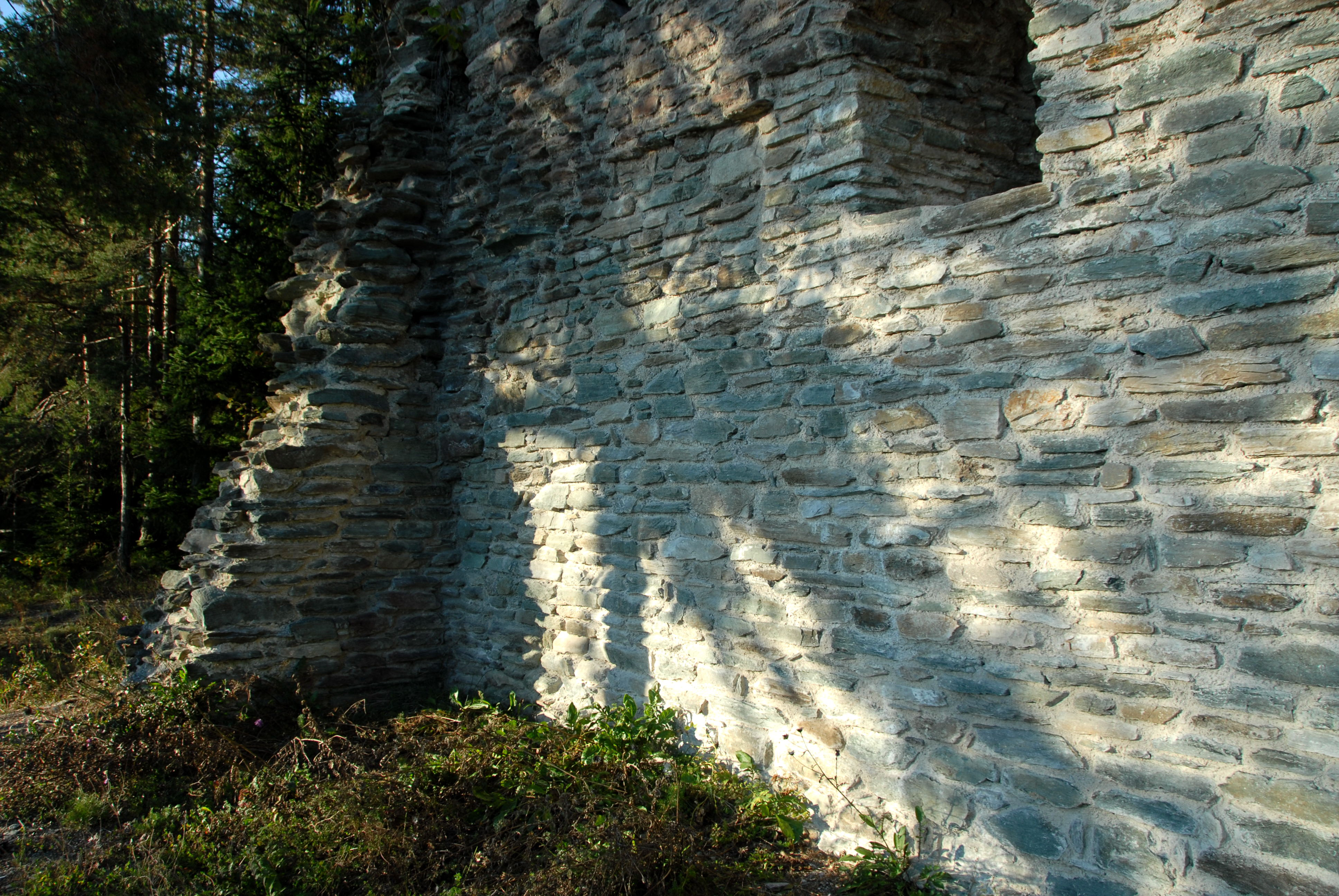
- Castle ruins

Site information
- Type: Hillside castle
- Condition: Ruined

Site history
- Built: 12th century
- Built by: Counts of Lurn
- Demolished: 15th century

Burgruine Hohenburg auf Rosenberg is a ruined medieval castle near Spittal an der Drau in Carinthia, Austria. It is located high above the Drava Valley on the southern slope of the Ankogel Group, part of the Hohe Tauern mountain range.

== History ==
Probably erected in the late 11th century, the castle was first mentioned as castrum Hohenburc in an 1142 deed. It was then the seat of a Bavarian noble family, who as Counts of Lurn administered the Lurngau (see: Lurnfeld) region within the Duchy of Carinthia. The last count, Altmann, had become Prince-Bishop of Trent in 1124, and upon his death in 1149, the castle was bequested to the Archbishopric of Salzburg and became the seat of episcopal ministeriales.

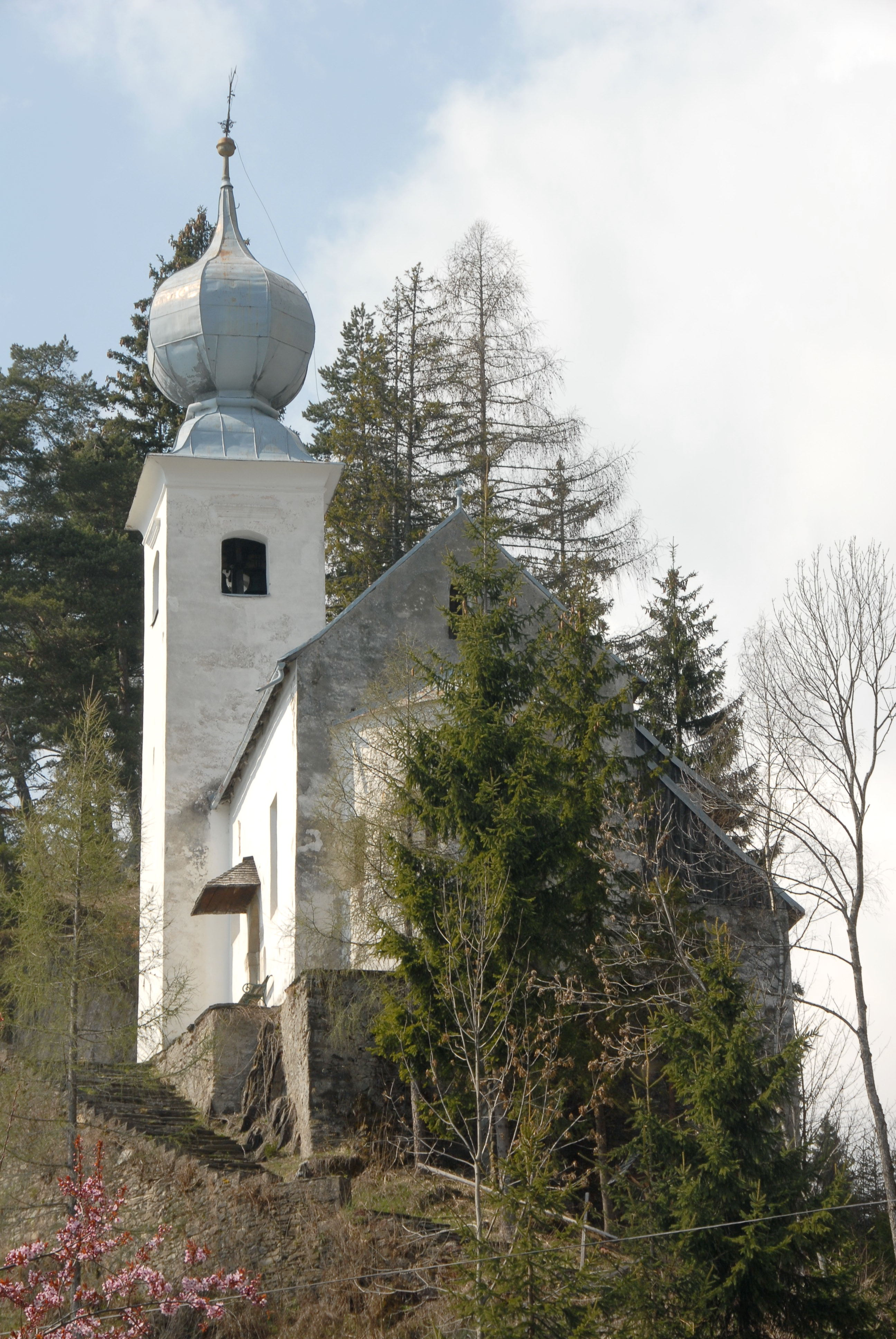
Sankt Maria in Hohenburg

Under the mediation of Duke Ulrich III of Carinthia, in 1263 a division of the property was arranged between the Salzburg archbishops and the neighbouring Counts of Ortenburg, heirs of the extinct Counts of Lurn, who had aspired the Hohenburg estates for decades. In 1311, Archbishop Conrad IV of Salzburg enfeoffed a part of Hohenburg Castle to the sons of late Count Frederick I of Ortenburg (1247–1304). Nevertheless, the residence became less important when it was replaced by nearby Feldsberg Castle as administrative seat of the Salzburg possessions. When the Ortenburg dynasty became extinct in 1418, their possessions passed to the Counts of Celje.

Today, only ruins remain. The castle was probably destroyed in the 15th century conflicts between the Counts of Görz and the Habsburg emperor Frederick III over the heritage of Count Ulrich II of Celje. The former chapel was rebuilt as the Baroque St Mary's pilgrimage church (Maria in Hohenburg) in 1707.

== See also ==
- List of castles in Austria
