= Schloss Porcia =

Castle in Spittal, Austria

Coordinates: 46°47′52″N 13°29′44″E

Porcia Castle
- Schloss Porcia (in German)
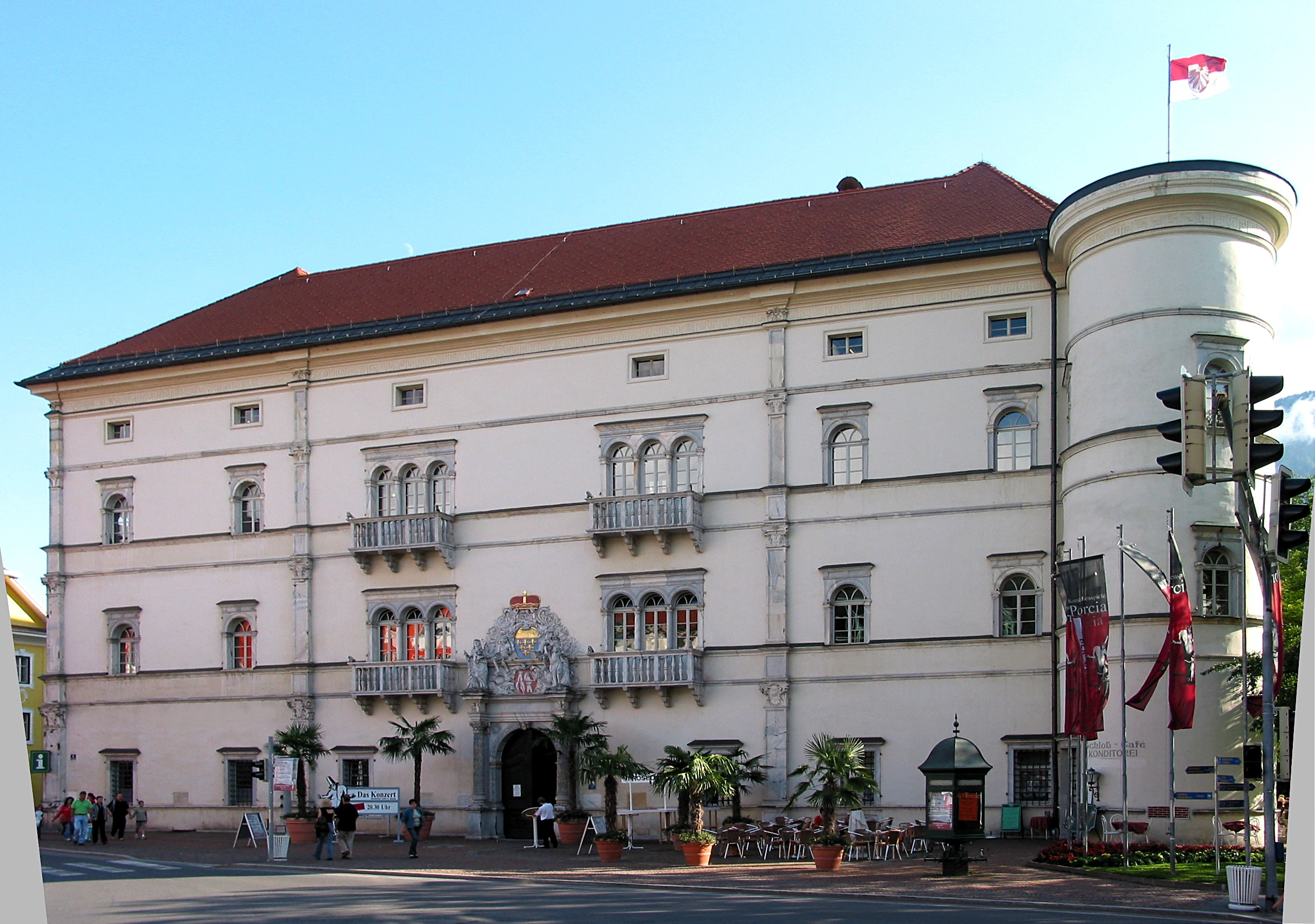
- Schloss Porcia in Spittal an der Drau (2005)
- Interactive map of the Porcia Castle area

General information
- Architectural style: Renaissance
- Location: Spittal an der Drau, Carinthia, Austria
- Construction started: 1533
- Client: Gabriel von Salamanca-Ortenburg
- Owner: Spittal an der Drau

Schloss Porcia (Porcia Castle) is a castle in Spittal an der Drau, in the Austrian state of Carinthia. It is one of the most significant Renaissance buildings in Austria.

== History ==
The construction of the castle began in 1533 at the behest of Count Gabriel von Salamanca-Ortenburg (1489–1539), treasurer and confidant of the Habsburg archduke Ferdinand I of Austria. Originally from Burgos in Habsburg Spain, Salamanca in 1524 for his services had received the estates of the Counts of Ortenburg in the Duchy of Carinthia. The comital dynasty had become extinct in 1418 and since their ancestral seat Ortenburg Castle did not meet Salamanca's standards, he commissioned the design of his new residence in Spittal to Italian architects who designed the building in a palazzo style. However he never lived here, as the construction works continued until 1598.

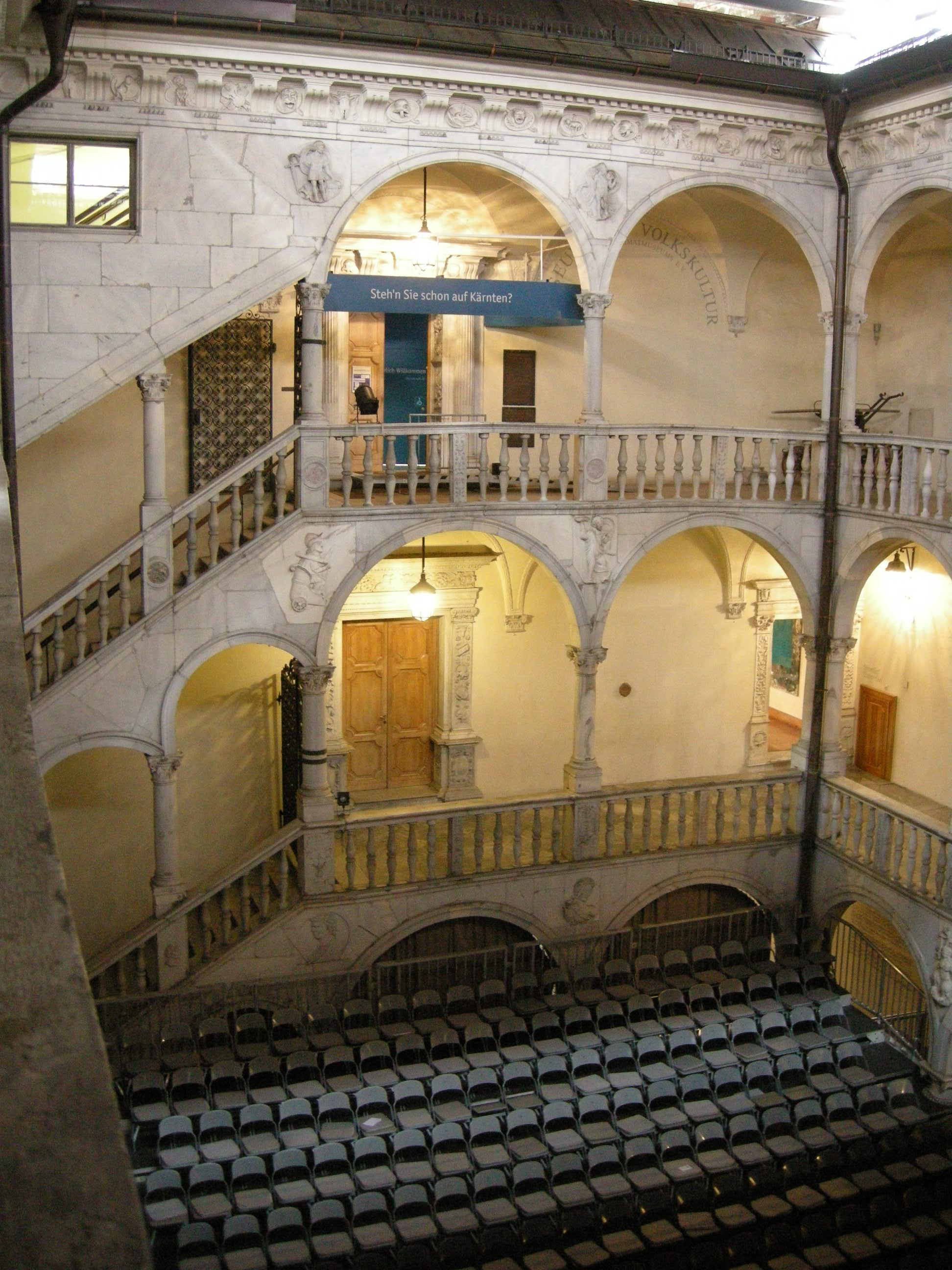
Inner courtyard of the Schloss Porcia, Spittal an der Drau, Eastern Alps, Carinthia, Austria (2010)

After the Salamanca dynasty had become extinct in 1620, the local patrician Widmann family acquired the castle and in 1662 assigned it to Prince Johann-Ferdinand von Porcia, at this time minister of the Habsburg emperor Leopold I. His descendants added Baroque elements to the façade in the 18th century, while the adjacent park was laid out in the 19th century.

Not until 1918 did the Princes of Porcia sell the castle to Baron Klinger von Klingerstorff. In 1951 it became a property of the Spittal municipality and accessible to the public. The famous arcaded courtyard houses several Lombard-Italian sculptures and since 1961 serves as a venue for the annual Komödienspiele Porcia theatre festival. Furthermore, the castle houses a museum for local history and is the site of several concerts and chorus recitals.

Porcia Castle is notorious for the ghost of the White Lady Katharina of Ortenburg-Salamanca, who is said to be guilty of remorselessness towards her subjects and cursed to haunt the rooms of the castle.

== See also ==
- Palais Porcia, Vienna
