= Porcia (Fra Bartolomeo) =

Painting by Fra Bartolomeo

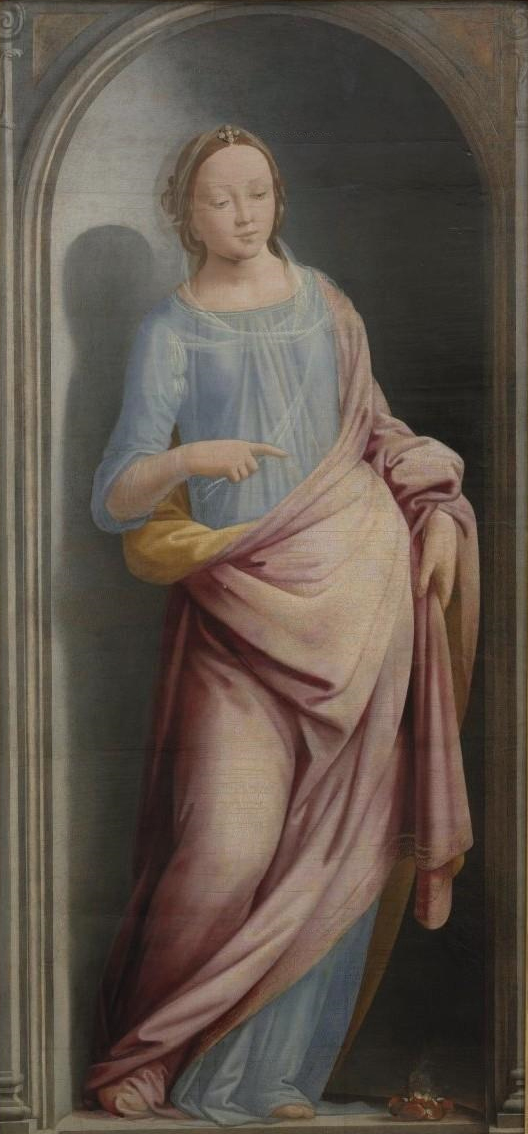
- Artist: Fra Bartolomeo
- Year: c. 1490-1495
- Medium: oil on panel
- Dimensions: 108 cm × 52 cm (43 in × 20 in)
- Location: Uffizi, Florence

Porcia is an oil-on-panel painting of Brutus' wife Porcia painted c. 1490–1495 by the Italian artist Fra Bartolomeo, now in the Uffizi in Florence. It forms a pair with Minerva, now in the Louvre, in Paris.

== Description and style ==
From a niche appears Porcia, the daughter of Cato the Younger. She can be recognized by the burning coals at her feet, because she killed herself by swallowing hot coals after the defeat of her husband, Marcus Junius Brutus, at the Battle of Philippi on 42 BC. The painting was meant to be part of a series dedicated to illustrious women, perhaps destined to decorate the room of a private palace.

The figure sways to the left, pointing to a probable pendant to the right. The large drapery, which falls with large and solemn folds, increases the sense of volume, as does the placement in the niche, usually reserved for statuary.

== Provenance ==
The painting left the Uffizi during the First World War to be stored safely elsewhere. From 1925 onwards it was displayed in the Italian Embassy in Washington, DC, Finally it was returned to Italy in 1992 to be exhibited in the Hall of Michelangelo the Florentines of the early 16th century, in the Uffizi.
