= Palais Porcia, Vienna =

Building in Vienna, Austria

Coordinates: 48°12′41″N 16°21′50″E

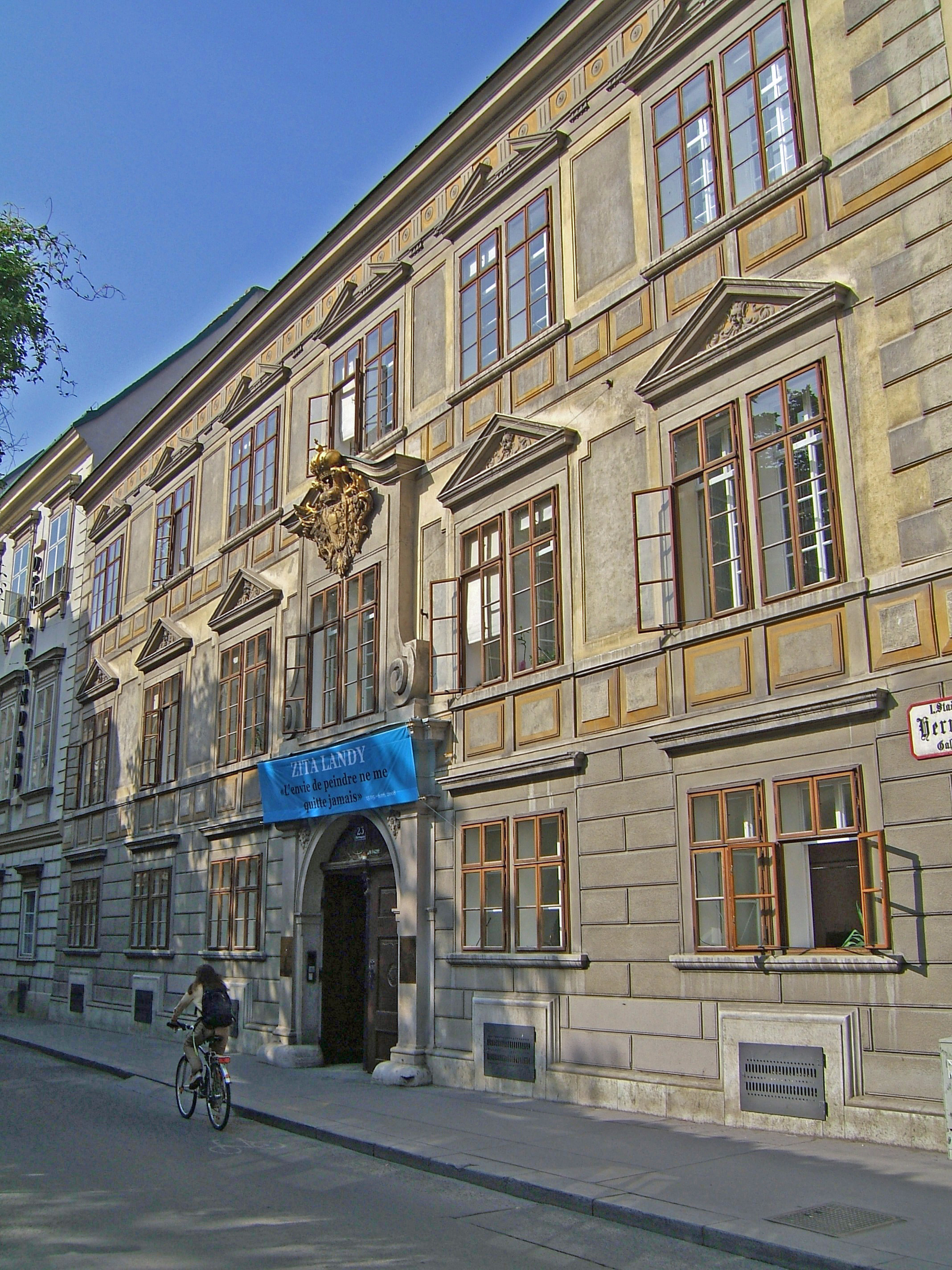
Palais Porcia, Vienna.

Palais Porcia is a former urban residence in the western quarter of the Innere Stadt of Vienna, Austria. It stands at 23, Herrengasse between Palais Kinsky and Palais Trautmansdorff and across Palais Harrach. The palace was built in 1546 for the descendants of Count Gabriel von Salamanca-Ortenburg. It was representative of the simple Renaissance style that emerged in Vienna in the middle of the 16th century. In the 17th and later centuries it was extensively remodelled in Baroque and Rococo styles but the inner court still contains an early Renaissance arcade. As of 2010, Palais Porcia houses the Administrative Library of the Austrian Federal Chancellery.

== History ==
The first documented stone buildings on the site of present-day Palais Porcia emerged in the 15th century. The foundations are older, dating back to Roman period.

In 1528 the cluster of buildings south of Freyung was purchased by the royal treasurer (German: königliche Pfennigmeister) Johann Löbl. In 1538 Löbl sold it to his successor, treasurer Count Gabriel von Salamanca-Ortenburg. The new owner commissioned the rebuilding of old medieval structures, using arcades to blend them into a single stately residence with then-fashionable Renaissance facade. The work was completed after the Count's death, in 1546. In 1592 the building passed to Hofkirchen and Losenstein families. In 1602 they began an extensive remodeling that added early Baroque detail to the original facade. Inside, the building acquired an ornate spiral staircase carved of "Royal limestone" (German: Kaiserstein) from Kaisersteinbruch.

In 1627 the Palais passed to Count Wratislav zu Fürstenberg, in 1643 to Jörger von Tollet family, in 1660 to Count Johann Karl von Porcia, son and heir of Johann-Ferdinand von Porcia (Prince of the Holy Roman Empire after 1662). The building survived the fire of 1683 that destroyed the buildings of the nearby Freyung and is still named after the Princes of Porcia although the family disposed with the building in the 1720s. It became the property of statesman Bartholomäus von Tinti, who also owned the Schallaburg castle. In the 1750s it was purchased by the Court of Maria Theresa of Austria and remains a state property to date (2010). In 1883 the interiors were completely rebuilt, and the Palais became a courthouse.

== Library ==
The Administrative Library of the Ministry of Interior, predecessor of the present-day library, was founded in 1849. It was based in the Ministry offices on Wipplingerstrasse. In 1897 the library moved into its own building on Marc-Aurel-Strasse, one year later it relocated to Hohen Markt. In 1925 the library relocated into recently remodelled Palais Porcia. Since the establishment of the First Austrian Republic the library remains a branch of the Federal Chancellery.

The library stocks a reference collection of Austrian laws and regulations and houses the information technology center of the Chancellery. Since 2000, the library gradually took over and digitized the collections of the Federal Government ministries. In 2006 it became Austria's principal uplink gateway to SourceOECD (Austrian OECD depositary).

As of 2010, the library loans books only to government employees. The reading hall is open free of charge to all visitors (photo ID required to enter).
