= 1999 Canoe Slalom World Cup =

The 1999 Canoe Slalom World Cup was a series of five races in 4 canoeing and kayaking categories organized by the International Canoe Federation (ICF). It was the 12th edition. The series consisted of 4 regular world cup races and the world cup final.

== Calendar ==
Label	Venue	Date
World Cup Race 1	(Slovenia) Tacen	18–20 June
World Cup Race 2	(Slovenia) Tacen	22–24 June
World Cup Race 3	(Slovakia) Bratislava	13–15 August
World Cup Race 4	(Germany) Augsburg	20–22 August
World Cup Final	(Australia) Penrith	30 September - 3 October

== Final standings ==
The winner of each world cup race was awarded 30 points. The points scale reached down to 1 point for 20th place in the men's K1, while in the other three categories only the top 15 received points (with 6 points for 15th place). Only the best two results of each athlete from the first 4 world cups plus the result from the world cup final counted for the final world cup standings. Furthermore, an athlete or boat had to compete in the world cup final in order to be classified in the world cup rankings.

=== C1 men ===
Pos	Athlete	Points
1	Stanislav Ježek (CZE)	75
2	Michal Martikán (SVK)	75
3	Patrice Estanguet (FRA)	75
4	Lukáš Pollert (CZE)	71
5	Juraj Minčík (SVK)	55
6	Mariusz Wieczorek (POL)	49
7	Martin Lang (GER)	46
8	Tony Estanguet (FRA)	42
9	Krzysztof Bieryt (POL)	40
10	Justin Boocock (AUS)	37

=== C2 men ===
Pos	Athletes	Points
1	Pavol Hochschorner/Peter Hochschorner (SVK)	90
2	Marek Jiras/Tomáš Máder (CZE)	77
3	André Ehrenberg/Michael Senft (GER)	65
4	Frank Adisson/Wilfrid Forgues (FRA)	58
5	Krzysztof Kołomański/Michał Staniszewski (POL)	55
6	Milan Kubáň/Marián Olejník (SVK)	53
7	Jaroslav Volf/Ondřej Štěpánek (CZE)	52
8	Kay Simon/Robby Simon (GER)	39
9	Stuart Bowman/Nick Smith (GBR)	38
10	Andrzej Wójs/Sławomir Mordarski (POL)	35

=== K1 men ===
Pos	Athlete	Points
1	Paul Ratcliffe (GBR)	90
2	Scott Shipley (USA)	80
3	Fedja Marušič (SLO)	65
4	Thomas Becker (GER)	61
5	Helmut Oblinger (AUT)	50
6	Manuel Köhler (AUT)	48
7	Enrico Lazzarotto (ITA)	45
8	Laurent Burtz (FRA)	44
9	Miha Štricelj (SLO)	38
10	Ondřej Raab (CZE)	35

=== K1 women ===
Pos	Athlete	Points
1	Susanne Hirt (GER)	90
2	Štěpánka Hilgertová (CZE)	80
3	Elena Kaliská (SVK)	62
4	Rachel Crosbee (GBR)	58
5	Marcela Sadilová (CZE)	55
6	Mandy Planert (GER)	47
7	Evi Huss (GER)	46
8	María Eizmendi (ESP)	44
9	Gabriela Stacherová (SVK)	38
10	Rebecca Bennett (USA)	36

== Results ==
=== World Cup Race 1 ===
The first world cup race of the season took place at the Tacen Whitewater Course, Slovenia from 18 to 20 June.

Event	Gold	Score	Silver	Score	Bronze	Score
C1 men	Lukáš Pollert (CZE)	201.61	Patrice Estanguet (FRA)	202.26	Tony Estanguet (FRA)	203.13
C2 men	Czech Republic; Marek Jiras; Tomáš Máder	209.11	Slovakia; Pavol Hochschorner; Peter Hochschorner	215.25	Poland; Krzysztof Kołomański; Michał Staniszewski	215.77
K1 men	Scott Shipley (USA)	183.69	Fedja Marušič (SLO)	187.42	Miha Štricelj (SLO); Manuel Köhler (AUT)	189.14; 189.14
K1 women	Štěpánka Hilgertová (CZE)	213.56	Elena Kaliská (SVK)	218.17	Barbara Nadalin (ITA)	227.23

=== World Cup Race 2 ===
The second world cup race was originally scheduled to take place on June 25–27 in Skopje, Macedonia, but was eventually moved to Tacen due to political reasons. The race was held at the Tacen Whitewater Course from 22 to 24 June.

Event	Gold	Score	Silver	Score	Bronze	Score
C1 men	Lukáš Pollert (CZE)	199.43	Mariusz Wieczorek (POL)	201.14	Juraj Minčík (SVK)	203.15
C2 men	Czech Republic; Marek Jiras; Tomáš Máder	207.79	Czech Republic; Jaroslav Volf; Ondřej Štěpánek	211.96	Slovakia; Roman Štrba; Roman Vajs	214.24
K1 men	Paul Ratcliffe (GBR)	180.22	Fedja Marušič (SLO)	184.53	Scott Shipley (USA)	184.64
K1 women	Štěpánka Hilgertová (CZE)	215.63	Marcela Sadilová (CZE)	220.71	Rachel Crosbee (GBR)	221.05

=== World Cup Race 3 ===
The third world cup race of the season took place at the Čunovo Water Sports Centre, Slovakia from 13 to 15 August.

Event	Gold	Score	Silver	Score	Bronze	Score
C1 men	Patrice Estanguet (FRA)	209.76	Stanislav Ježek (CZE)	211.61	Michal Martikán (SVK)	212.60
C2 men	Slovakia; Pavol Hochschorner; Peter Hochschorner	222.54	Germany; André Ehrenberg; Michael Senft	226.02	Slovakia; Roman Štrba; Roman Vajs	227.48
K1 men	Paul Ratcliffe (GBR)	199.02	Scott Shipley (USA)	200.38	Vojtěch Bareš (CZE)	206.27
K1 women	Susanne Hirt (GER)	231.34	Mandy Planert (GER)	232.01	Elena Kaliská (SVK)	232.57

=== World Cup Race 4 ===
The fourth world cup race of the season took place at the Augsburg Eiskanal, Germany from 20 to 22 August.

Event	Gold	Score	Silver	Score	Bronze	Score
C1 men	Michal Martikán (SVK)	197.50	Juraj Minčík (SVK)	202.31	Stanislav Ježek (CZE)	202.36
C2 men	Slovakia; Pavol Hochschorner; Peter Hochschorner	210.55	Germany; André Ehrenberg; Michael Senft	213.17	Slovakia; Milan Kubáň; Marián Olejník	214.51
K1 men	Scott Shipley (USA)	188.66	Enrico Lazzarotto (ITA)	189.03	Thomas Becker (GER)	190.08
K1 women	Susanne Hirt (GER)	211.30	Evi Huss (GER)	213.37	Sandra Friedli (SUI)	215.50

=== World Cup Final ===
The final world cup race of the season took place at the newly built Penrith Whitewater Stadium, Australia from 30 September to 3 October.

Event	Gold	Score	Silver	Score	Bronze	Score
C1 men	Stanislav Ježek (CZE)	239.85	Michal Martikán (SVK)	240.87	Patrice Estanguet (FRA)	243.03
C2 men	Slovakia; Pavol Hochschorner; Peter Hochschorner	249.37	France; Frank Adisson; Wilfrid Forgues	252.64	Poland; Krzysztof Kołomański; Michał Staniszewski	254.12
K1 men	Paul Ratcliffe (GBR)	223.54	Thomas Becker (GER)	226.40	Scott Shipley (USA)	226.41
K1 women	Susanne Hirt (GER)	250.93	Rachel Crosbee (GBR)	257.38	Štěpánka Hilgertová (CZE)	257.66
