= 2000 Canoe Slalom World Cup =

The 2000 Canoe Slalom World Cup was a series of six races in 4 canoeing and kayaking categories organized by the International Canoe Federation (ICF). It was the 13th edition. The series consisted of 5 regular world cup races and the world cup final.

== Calendar ==
Label	Venue	Date
World Cup Race 1	(Australia) Penrith	29–30 April
World Cup Race 2	(United States) Ocoee	17–18 June
World Cup Race 3	(France) Saint-Pé-de-Bigorre	1–2 July
World Cup Race 4	(Spain) La Seu d'Urgell	8–9 July
World Cup Race 5	(Czech Republic) Prague	21–23 July
World Cup Final	(Germany) Augsburg	29–30 July

== Final standings ==
The winner of each world cup race was awarded 30 points. The points scale reached down to 1 point for 20th place in the men's K1, while in the other three categories only the top 15 received points (with 6 points for 15th place). Only the best two results of each athlete from the first 5 world cups plus the result from the world cup final counted for the final world cup standings. Furthermore, an athlete or boat had to compete in the world cup final in order to be classified in the world cup rankings. If two or more athletes or boats were equal on points, the ranking was determined by their positions in the World Cup Final.

=== C1 men ===
Pos	Athlete	Points
1	Michal Martikán (SVK)	85
2	Juraj Minčík (SVK)	80
3	Patrice Estanguet (FRA)	70
4	Stuart McIntosh (GBR)	54
5	Sören Kaufmann (GER)	48
6	Mariusz Wieczorek (POL)	41
7	Robin Bell (AUS)	41
8	Stefan Pfannmöller (GER)	37
9	David Hearn (USA)	36
10	Dejan Stevanovič (SLO)	35

=== C2 men ===
Pos	Athletes	Points
1	Pavol Hochschorner/Peter Hochschorner (SVK)	85
2	Krzysztof Kołomański/Michał Staniszewski (POL)	75
3	André Ehrenberg/Michael Senft (GER)	60
4	Marek Jiras/Tomáš Máder (CZE)	58
5	Andrzej Wójs/Sławomir Mordarski (POL)	54
6	Kai Walter/Frank Henze (GER)	49
7	Stuart Bowman/Nick Smith (GBR)	46
8	Milan Kubáň/Marián Olejník (SVK)	45
9	Christophe Luquet/Pierre Luquet (FRA)	40
10	Jaroslav Pospíšil/Jaroslav Pollert (CZE)	37

=== K1 men ===
Pos	Athlete	Points
1	Paul Ratcliffe (GBR)	76
2	Scott Shipley (USA)	67
3	Pierpaolo Ferrazzi (ITA)	67
4	Helmut Oblinger (AUT)	65
5	Eric Giddens (USA)	53
6	Thomas Schmidt (GER)	52
7	Thomas Becker (GER)	46
8	Benoît Peschier (FRA)	43
9	Floris Braat (NED)	43
10	Christian Rickert (GER)	40

=== K1 women ===
Pos	Athlete	Points
1	Elena Kaliská (SVK)	80
2	Mandy Planert (GER)	80
3	Susanne Hirt (GER)	60
4	Rebecca Giddens (USA)	60
5	Marcela Sadilová (CZE)	57
6	Gabriela Brosková (SVK)	43
7	Gabriela Stacherová (SVK)	42
8	Margaret Langford (CAN)	41
9	Sandra Friedli (SUI)	41
10	María Eizmendi (ESP)	31

== Results ==
=== World Cup Race 1 ===
The first world cup race of the season took place at the Penrith Whitewater Stadium, Australia from 29 to 30 April.

Event	Gold	Score	Silver	Score	Bronze	Score
C1 men	Michal Martikán (SVK)	227.05	Juraj Minčík (SVK)	229.47	Tony Estanguet (FRA)	232.10
C2 men	France; Frank Adisson; Wilfrid Forgues		Czech Republic; Marek Jiras; Tomáš Máder		Poland; Krzysztof Kołomański; Michał Staniszewski	
K1 men	Paul Ratcliffe (GBR)	216.76	Pierpaolo Ferrazzi (ITA)	218.90	Scott Shipley (USA)	219.13
K1 women	Mandy Planert (GER)	243.20	Elena Kaliská (SVK)	243.92	Susanne Hirt (GER)	249.31

=== World Cup Race 2 ===
The second world cup race of the season took place at the Ocoee Whitewater Center, Tennessee from 17 to 18 June. The C2 event in Ocoee did not count for the world cup standings due to only 4 federations competing in the event.

Event	Gold	Score	Silver	Score	Bronze	Score
C1 men	Patrice Estanguet (FRA)	242.94	Joe Jacobi (USA)	258.79	Hervé Delamarre (FRA)	266.34
C2 men (no points awarded)	France; Philippe Quémerais; Yann Le Pennec	261.92	United States; Scott McCleskey; David Hepp	263.26	France; Christophe Luquet; Pierre Luquet	269.54
K1 men	Eric Giddens (USA)	231.69	Jean-Yves Cheutin (FRA)	233.13	Scott Parsons (USA)	234.57
K1 women	Rebecca Giddens (USA)	271.95	Susanne Hirt (GER)	273.87	Anne-Lise Bardet (FRA)	284.13

=== World Cup Race 3 ===
The third world cup race of the season took place in Saint-Pé-de-Bigorre, France from 1 to 2 July.

Event	Gold	Score	Silver	Score	Bronze	Score
C1 men	Tony Estanguet (FRA)	210.53	Emmanuel Brugvin (FRA)	212.76	Sören Kaufmann (GER)	215.84
C2 men	Poland; Krzysztof Kołomański; Michał Staniszewski	226.95	France; Frank Adisson; Wilfrid Forgues; Poland; Andrzej Wójs; Sławomir Mordarski	232.53 232.53	-	
K1 men	Paul Ratcliffe (GBR)	202.33	Helmut Oblinger (AUT)	204.79	Thomas Schmidt (GER)	204.80
K1 women	Brigitte Guibal (FRA)	230.99	Mandy Planert (GER)	232.43	Susanne Hirt (GER)	233.47

=== World Cup Race 4 ===
The fourth world cup race of the season took place at the Segre Olympic Park in La Seu d'Urgell, Spain from 8 to 9 July.

Event	Gold	Score	Silver	Score	Bronze	Score
C1 men	Michal Martikán (SVK)	203.73	Patrice Estanguet (FRA)	204.07	Tony Estanguet (FRA)	209.52
C2 men	Slovakia; Pavol Hochschorner; Peter Hochschorner	214.54	Poland; Krzysztof Kołomański; Michał Staniszewski	215.38	United Kingdom; Stuart Bowman; Nick Smith	219.30
K1 men	Floris Braat (NED)	196.87	Helmut Oblinger (AUT)	196.97	Manuel Köhler (AUT)	198.49
K1 women	Rebecca Giddens (USA)	215.99	Elena Kaliská (SVK)	227.50	Brigitte Guibal (FRA)	228.16

=== World Cup Race 5 ===
The fifth world cup race of the season took place at the Prague-Troja Canoeing Centre, Czech Republic from 21 to 23 July.

Event	Gold	Score	Silver	Score	Bronze	Score
C1 men	Tony Estanguet (FRA)	205.80	Juraj Minčík (SVK)	208.28	Stuart McIntosh (GBR)	209.16
C2 men	Slovakia; Pavol Hochschorner; Peter Hochschorner	219.37	Czech Republic; Marek Jiras; Tomáš Máder	222.75	Czech Republic; Jaroslav Volf; Ondřej Štěpánek	224.83
K1 men	Paul Ratcliffe (GBR)	200.12	Pierpaolo Ferrazzi (ITA)	201.54	Mathias Röthenmund (SUI)	202.17
K1 women	Štěpánka Hilgertová (CZE)	218.64	Mandy Planert (GER)	222.92	Marcela Sadilová (CZE)	226.36

=== World Cup Final ===
The final world cup race of the season took place at the Augsburg Eiskanal, Germany from 29 to 30 July.

Event	Gold	Score	Silver	Score	Bronze	Score
C1 men	Juraj Minčík (SVK)	207.54	Michal Martikán (SVK)	208.04	Nico Bettge (GER)	209.69
C2 men	Germany; André Ehrenberg; Michael Senft	217.13	Slovakia; Pavol Hochschorner; Peter Hochschorner	217.62	Poland; Krzysztof Kołomański; Michał Staniszewski	218.71
K1 men	Scott Shipley (USA)	193.06	Thomas Schmidt (GER)	193.26	Thomas Becker (GER)	195.35
K1 women	Elena Kaliská (SVK)	220.16	Mandy Planert (GER)	226.04	Marcela Sadilová (CZE)	226.62
