= Fedja Marušič =

Slovenian canoeist

Medal record

Men's canoe slalom

Representing Slovenia

World Championships
Silver medal – second place	1995 Nottingham	K1 team
Silver medal – second place	1999 La Seu d'Urgell	K1 team

European Championships
Silver medal – second place	2000 Mezzana	K1 team
Bronze medal – third place	1998 Roudnice nad Labem	K1 team

Fedja Marušič (born 10 October 1971 in Solkan) is a Slovenian slalom canoeist who competed from the late 1980s to the mid-2000s (decade).

He won two silver medals in the K1 team event at the ICF Canoe Slalom World Championships, earning them in 1995 and 1999. He also won a silver and a bronze in the same event at the European Championships.

Marušič also competed in two Summer Olympics, earning his best finish of 15th in the K1 event in Sydney in 2000.

== World Cup individual podiums ==
Season	Date	Venue	Position	Event
1995	25 Jun 1995	Prague	2nd	K1
1995	2 Jul 1995	Tacen	3rd	K1
1996	16 Jun 1996	Augsburg	1st	K1
1996	25 Aug 1996	Prague	3rd	K1
1996	29 Sep 1996	Três Coroas	3rd	K1
1997	22 Jun 1997	Bourg St.-Maurice	3rd	K1
1997	6 Jul 1997	Bratislava	3rd	K1
1999	20 Jun 1999	Tacen	2nd	K1
1999	24 Jun 1999	Tacen	2nd	K1
