= Michał Staniszewski =

Polish canoeist (born 1973)

Medal record

Men's canoe slalom

Representing Poland

Olympic Games
Silver medal – second place	2000 Sydney	C2

World Championships
Gold medal – first place	1995 Nottingham	C2
Silver medal – second place	1999 La Seu d'Urgell	C2

European Championships
Silver medal – second place	1996 Augsburg	C2 team
Bronze medal – third place	1996 Augsburg	C2
Bronze medal – third place	2000 Mezzana	C2

Junior World Championships
Gold medal – first place	1990 Tavanasa	C2

Michał Tomasz Staniszewski (born 16 September 1973 in Opoczno) is a Polish slalom canoeist who competed at the international level from 1990 to 2000. Competing in three Summer Olympics, he won a silver in the C2 event in Sydney in 2000.

Staniszewski also won two medals in the C2 event at the ICF Canoe Slalom World Championships with a gold in 1995 and a silver in 1999. He also has three medals from the European Championships (1 silver and 2 bronzes).

His partner in the C2 boat throughout the whole of his active career was Krzysztof Kołomański.

== World Cup individual podiums ==
	1st place, gold medalist(s)	2nd place, silver medalist(s)	3rd place, bronze medalist(s)	Total
C2	2	3	8	13

Season	Date	Venue	Position	Event
1992	20 June 1992	Bourg St.-Maurice	3rd	C2
1993	25 July 1993	Lofer	2nd	C2
1993	1 August 1993	Augsburg	3rd	C2
1994	26 June 1994	Nottingham	3rd	C2
1995	1 October 1995	Ocoee	3rd	C2
1997	29 June 1997	Björbo	1st	C2
1998	28 June 1998	Augsburg	2nd	C2
1999	20 June 1999	Tacen	3rd	C2
1999	3 October 1999	Penrith	3rd	C2
2000	30 April 2000	Penrith	3rd	C2
2000	2 July 2000	Saint-Pé-de-Bigorre	1st	C2
2000	9 July 2000	La Seu d'Urgell	2nd	C2
2000	30 July 2000	Augsburg	3rd	C2
