= Paul Ratcliffe (canoeist) =

British slalom canoeist (born 1973)

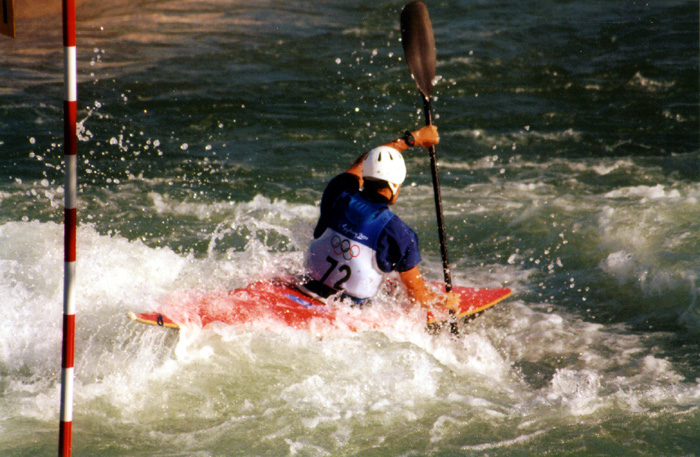

Medal record

Men's canoe slalom

Representing Great Britain

Olympic Games
| Silver medal – second place | 2000 Sydney | K1 |

World Championships
| Gold medal – first place | 1997 Três Coroas | K1 team |
| Bronze medal – third place | 1997 Três Coroas | K1 |
| Bronze medal – third place | 1999 La Seu d'Urgell | K1 |

European Championships
| Gold medal – first place | 1998 Roudnice nad Labem | K1 |
| Gold medal – first place | 2002 Bratislava | K1 |

Paul Ratcliffe (born 12 November 1973 in Salford) is a British slalom canoeist who competed from the early 1990s to the mid-2000s.

== Early life ==
He came from Tyldesley, in Wigan, and trained with Manchester Canoe Club.

He attended the University of Nottingham.

== Career ==
Competing in two Summer Olympics, he won a silver medal in the K1 event in Sydney in 2000.

Ratcliffe also won three medals at the ICF Canoe Slalom World Championships with a gold (K1 team: 1997) and two bronzes (K1: 1997, 1999).

He won overall World Cup title in K1 in three consecutive seasons between 1998 and 2000. He is also a two-time European Champion.

== World Cup individual podiums ==
| | 1st place, gold medalist(s) | 2nd place, silver medalist(s) | 3rd place, bronze medalist(s) | Total |
| K1 | 11 | 2 | 1 | 14 |

| Season | Date | Venue | Position | Event |
|---|---|---|---|---|
| 1996 | 29 September 1996 | Três Coroas | 1st | K1 |
| 1997 | 22 June 1997 | Bourg St.-Maurice | 1st | K1 |
| 1997 | 29 June 1997 | Björbo | 1st | K1 |
| 1998 | 21 June 1998 | Tacen | 1st | K1 |
| 1998 | 2 August 1998 | Wausau | 2nd | K1 |
| 1998 | 13 September 1998 | La Seu d'Urgell | 1st | K1 |
| 1999 | 24 June 1999 | Tacen | 1st | K1 |
| 1999 | 15 August 1999 | Bratislava | 1st | K1 |
| 1999 | 3 October 1999 | Penrith | 1st | K1 |
| 2000 | 30 April 2000 | Penrith | 1st | K1 |
| 2000 | 2 July 2000 | Saint-Pé-de-Bigorre | 1st | K1 |
| 2000 | 23 July 2000 | Prague | 1st | K1 |
| 2003 | 6 July 2003 | La Seu d'Urgell | 2nd | K1 |
| 2003 | 31 July 2003 | Bratislava | 3rd | K1 |
