= Patrice Estanguet =

French slalom canoeist

Medal record

Men's canoe slalom

Representing France

Olympic Games
Bronze medal – third place	1996 Atlanta	C1

World Championships
Silver medal – second place	1997 Três Coroas	C1 team
Silver medal – second place	2003 Augsburg	C1 team
Bronze medal – third place	1999 La Seu d'Urgell	C1 team
Bronze medal – third place	2002 Bourg St.-Maurice	C1

Junior World Championships
Gold medal – first place	1990 Tavanasa	C1 team
Silver medal – second place	1990 Tavanasa	C1

Patrice Estanguet (born 19 April 1973 in Pau) is a French slalom canoeist who competed at the international level from 1990 to 2004. He is the older brother of triple Olympic champion Tony Estanguet.

== Career ==
Patrice Estanguet won a bronze medal in the C1 event at the 1996 Summer Olympics in Atlanta.

He also won four medals at the ICF Canoe Slalom World Championships with two silvers (C1 team: 1997, 2003) and two bronzes (C1: 2002, C1 team: 1999).

He won the overall World Cup title in the C1 class in 1996 and 1997.

== World Cup individual podiums ==
	1st place, gold medalist(s)	2nd place, silver medalist(s)	3rd place, bronze medalist(s)	Total
C1	6	13	3	22

Season	Date	Venue	Position	Event
1993	18 July 1993	La Seu d'Urgell	1st	C1
1994	26 June 1994	Nottingham	3rd	C1
1994	17 July 1994	La Seu d'Urgell	2nd	C1
1995	9 July 1995	Mezzana	3rd	C1
1996	21 April 1996	Ocoee	2nd	C1
1996	9 June 1996	La Seu d'Urgell	1st	C1
1996	29 September 1996	Três Coroas	2nd	C1
1997	22 June 1997	Bourg St.-Maurice	1st	C1
1997	29 June 1997	Björbo	2nd	C1
1997	6 July 1997	Bratislava	2nd	C1
1997	28 July 1997	Ocoee	2nd	C1
1997	3 August 1997	Minden	2nd	C1
1998	28 June 1998	Augsburg	2nd	C1
1998	13 September 1998	La Seu d'Urgell	2nd	C1
1999	20 June 1999	Tacen	2nd	C1
1999	15 August 1999	Bratislava	1st	C1
1999	3 October 1999	Penrith	3rd	C1
2000	18 June 2000	Ocoee	1st	C1
2000	9 July 2000	La Seu d'Urgell	2nd	C1
2001	3 June 2001	Merano	1st	C1
2002	26 May 2002	Guangzhou	2nd	C1
2002	4 August 2002	Prague	2nd	C1
