= Rachel Crosbee =

British canoeist

Medal record

Women's canoe slalom

Representing Great Britain

World Championships
Silver medal – second place	1995 Nottingham	K1 team
Bronze medal – third place	1993 Mezzana	K1 team
Bronze medal – third place	1997 Três Coroas	K1 team
Bronze medal – third place	1999 La Seu d'Urgell	K1 team

European Championships
Silver medal – second place	1998 Roudnice nad Labem	K1 team

Rachel Norah Fox-Crosbee (née Fox; born 6 May 1969 in Harpenden) is a British slalom canoeist who competed at the international level from 1988 to 2000.

== Early life ==
She is the younger sister of Richard Fox, sister-in-law of Myriam Fox-Jerusalmi and aunt to Jessica Fox and Noemie Fox, all slalom canoeists

She trained on a canal in Hemel Hempstead in the mid-1980s, with coach Bob Grundy, of Hemel Hempstead Canoe Club.

In 1992, she lived at Cotgrave, and worked at the Queen's Medical Centre as a physiotherapist, training at the University of Nottingham.

She married David Crosbee in November 1992, who attended the Queen Elizabeth's Boys School in Mansfield, then Heriot-Watt University.

== Career ==
She won four medals in the K1 team event at the ICF Canoe Slalom World Championships with a silver (1995) and three bronzes (1993, 1997, 1999). She also won a silver medal in the same event at the 1998 European Championships in Roudnice nad Labem.

Crosbee also competed in two Summer Olympics, earning her best finish of 16th in the K1 event at the 1992 Summer Olympics in Barcelona.

== World Cup individual podiums ==
Season	Date	Venue	Position	Event
1994	26 Jun 1994	Nottingham	1st	K1
1994	10 Jul 1994	Bourg St.-Maurice	2nd	K1
1996	16 Jun 1996	Augsburg	2nd	K1
1999	24 Jun 1999	Tacen	3rd	K1
1999	3 Oct 1999	Penrith	2nd	K1
