= Marek Jiras =

Czech slalom canoeist

Medal record

Men's canoe slalom

Representing Czechoslovakia

Junior World Championships
Silver medal – second place	1992 Sjoa	C2

Representing Czech Republic

Olympic Games
Bronze medal – third place	2000 Sydney	C2

World Championships
Gold medal – first place	1993 Mezzana	C2 team
Gold medal – first place	1999 La Seu d'Urgell	C2
Gold medal – first place	1999 La Seu d'Urgell	C2 team
Gold medal – first place	2003 Augsburg	C2 team
Gold medal – first place	2006 Prague	C2 team
Gold medal – first place	2007 Foz do Iguaçu	C2 team
Silver medal – second place	1997 Três Coroas	C2 team
Bronze medal – third place	2002 Bourg St.-Maurice	C2

European Championships
Gold medal – first place	2009 Nottingham	C2 team
Silver medal – second place	2002 Bratislava	C2
Silver medal – second place	2005 Tacen	C2
Silver medal – second place	2007 Liptovský Mikuláš	C2 team
Bronze medal – third place	2006 L'Argentière-la-Bessée	C2 team

Marek Jiras (Czech pronunciation: [ˈmarɛk ˈjɪras], born 18 August 1976 in Prague) is a Czech slalom canoeist who competed at the international level from 1992 to 2009.

He won a bronze medal in the C2 event at the 2000 Summer Olympics together with Tomáš Máder. They then competed in the same event at the 2004 Summer Olympics, where they finished seventh.

Jiras and Máder also won eight medals at the ICF Canoe Slalom World Championships with six golds (C2: 1999, C2 team: 1993, 1999, 2003, 2006, 2007), a silver (C2 team: 1997) and a bronze (C2: 2002). They won five more medals at the European Championships (1 gold, 3 silvers and 1 bronze).

== World Cup individual podiums ==
	1st place, gold medalist(s)	2nd place, silver medalist(s)	3rd place, bronze medalist(s)	Total
C2	8	11	7	26

Season	Date	Venue	Position	Event
1993	18 July 1993	La Seu d'Urgell	2nd	C2
1996	9 June 1996	La Seu d'Urgell	1st	C2
1997	22 June 1997	Bourg St.-Maurice	3rd	C2
1997	29 June 1997	Björbo	3rd	C2
1997	28 July 1997	Ocoee	2nd	C2
1997	3 August 1997	Minden	1st	C2
1998	14 June 1998	Liptovský Mikuláš	1st	C2
1998	13 September 1998	La Seu d'Urgell	3rd	C2
1999	20 June 1999	Tacen	1st	C2
1999	24 June 1999	Tacen	1st	C2
2000	30 April 2000	Penrith	2nd	C2
2000	23 July 2000	Prague	2nd	C2
2001	10 June 2001	Tacen	3rd	C2
2001	28 July 2001	Augsburg	2nd	C2
2002	4 August 2002	Prague	3rd	C2
2003	6 July 2003	La Seu d'Urgell	2nd	C2
2003	13 July 2003	Tacen	1st	C2
2004	11 July 2004	Prague	2nd	C2
2004	17 July 2004	Augsburg	2nd	C2
2005	26 June 2005	Tacen	2nd	C2^{1}
2006	28 May 2006	Athens	3rd	C2
2006	11 June 2006	La Seu d'Urgell	1st	C2
2007	1 July 2007	Prague	2nd	C2
2007	14 July 2007	Augsburg	2nd	C2
2008	22 June 2008	Prague	1st	C2
2008	29 June 2008	Tacen	3rd	C2

^{1} European Championship counting for World Cup points
