= Evi Huss =

German canoeist

Medal record

Women's canoe slalom

Representing West Germany

Junior World Championships
Gold medal – first place	1990 Tavanasa	K1 team

Representing Germany

World Championships
Gold medal – first place	1997 Três Coroas	K1 team
Gold medal – first place	1999 La Seu d'Urgell	K1 team
Bronze medal – third place	1995 Nottingham	K1 team

European Championships
Silver medal – second place	1996 Augsburg	K1 team
Bronze medal – third place	1998 Roudnice nad Labem	K1 team
Bronze medal – third place	2000 Mezzana	K1 team

Junior World Championships
Silver medal – second place	1992 Sjoa	K1 team

Evi Huss (born 1974) is a German slalom canoeist who competed at the international level 1990 to 2001.

She won three medals in the K1 team event at the ICF Canoe Slalom World Championships with two golds (1997, 1999) and a bronze (1999). She also won a silver and two bronze medals in the same event at the European Championships.

== World Cup individual podiums ==
Season	Date	Venue	Position	Event
1996	16 Jun 1996	Augsburg	3rd	K1
1998	21 Jun 1998	Tacen	2nd	K1
1999	22 Aug 1999	Augsburg	2nd	K1
