= Canoeing at the 2000 Summer Olympics – Men's slalom C-1 =

These are the results of the men's C-1 slalom competition in canoeing at the 2000 Summer Olympics. The C-1 (canoe single) event is raced by one-man canoes through a whitewater course. The venue for the 2000 Olympic competition was in Penrith.

== Medalists ==
| Gold | Silver | Bronze |
| Tony Estanguet (FRA) | Michal Martikán (SVK) | Juraj Minčík (SVK) |

== Results ==
=== Qualifying ===
The 16 competitors each took two runs through the whitewater slalom course on 17 September. The combined score of both runs counted for the event with the top 12 advancing to the final round the following day.

| Rank | Name | Nation | Run 1 | | | Run 2 | | | Result |
| Rank | Name | Nation | Time | Points | Total | Time | Points | Total | Total |
|---|---|---|---|---|---|---|---|---|---|
| 1 | Michal Martikán | Slovakia | 128.69 | 0 | 128.69 | 134.00 | 0 | 134.00 | 262.69 |
| 2 | Tony Estanguet | France | 130.39 | 2 | 132.39 | 131.02 | 0 | 131.02 | 263.41 |
| 3 | Krzysztof Bieryt | Poland | 132.85 | 0 | 132.85 | 132.19 | 0 | 132.19 | 265.04 |
| 4 | Juraj Minčík | Slovakia | 131.88 | 2 | 133.88 | 131.28 | 2 | 133.28 | 267.16 |
| 5 | Robin Bell | Australia | 132.76 | 2 | 134.76 | 129.98 | 4 | 133.98 | 268.75 |
| 6 | Emmanuel Brugvin | France | 132.74 | 0 | 132.74 | 132.55 | 4 | 136.55 | 269.29 |
| 7 | Stefan Pfannmöller | Germany | 130.02 | 2 | 132.02 | 132.59 | 6 | 138.59 | 270.51 |
| 8 | Sören Kaufmann | Germany | 134.36 | 0 | 134.36 | 135.54 | 2 | 137.54 | 271.90 |
| 9 | Simon Hočevar | Slovenia | 136.64 | 0 | 136.64 | 135.61 | 2 | 137.61 | 274.25 |
| 10 | Stuart McIntosh | Great Britain | 136.55 | 0 | 136.55 | 133.84 | 4 | 137.84 | 274.39 |
| 11 | Danko Herceg | Croatia | 136.59 | 2 | 138.59 | 133.23 | 4 | 137.23 | 275.82 |
| 12 | David Hearn | United States | 135.53 | 0 | 135.53 | 139.36 | 6 | 145.36 | 280.89 |
| 13 | Tomáš Indruch | Czech Republic | 136.29 | 4 | 140.29 | 139.46 | 2 | 141.46 | 281.75 |
| 14 | Cássio Petry | Brazil | 143.63 | 2 | 145.63 | 144.09 | 4 | 148.09 | 293.72 |
| 15 | James Cartwright-Garland | Canada | 144.64 | 4 | 148.64 | 147.02 | 2 | 149.02 | 297.66 |
| 16 | Jon Ergüín | Spain | 138.14 | 54 | 192.14 | 170.48 | 0 | 170.48 | 362.62 |

=== Final ===
The 12 competitors each took two runs through the whitewater slalom course on 18 September. The combined score of both runs counted for the event.

| Rank | Name | Nation | Run 1 | | | Run 2 | | | Result |
| Rank | Name | Nation | Time | Points | Total | Time | Points | Total | Total |
|---|---|---|---|---|---|---|---|---|---|
| 1st place, gold medalist(s) | Tony Estanguet | France | 115.25 | 0 | 115.25 | 114.62 | 2 | 116.62 | 231.87 |
| 2nd place, silver medalist(s) | Michal Martikán | Slovakia | 117.17 | 2 | 119.17 | 114.59 | 0 | 114.59 | 233.76 |
| 3rd place, bronze medalist(s) | Juraj Minčík | Slovakia | 117.55 | 0 | 117.55 | 116.87 | 0 | 116.87 | 234.22 |
| 4 | Emmanuel Brugvin | France | 118.69 | 0 | 118.69 | 117.73 | 2 | 119.73 | 238.42 |
| 5 | Stefan Pfannmöller | Germany | 119.03 | 0 | 119.03 | 116.69 | 4 | 120.69 | 239.72 |
| 6 | Sören Kaufmann | Germany | 121.83 | 2 | 123.83 | 116.35 | 0 | 116.35 | 240.18 |
| 7 | Simon Hočevar | Slovenia | 119.78 | 0 | 119.78 | 120.86 | 0 | 120.86 | 240.64 |
| 8 | Stuart McIntosh | Great Britain | 121.23 | 0 | 121.23 | 118.38 | 4 | 122.38 | 243.61 |
| 9 | Robin Bell | Australia | 118.32 | 2 | 120.32 | 124.16 | 0 | 124.16 | 244.48 |
| 10 | Danko Herceg | Croatia | 123.87 | 2 | 125.87 | 118.90 | 4 | 122.90 | 248.77 |
| 11 | Krzysztof Bieryt | Poland | 118.36 | 8 | 126.36 | 122.87 | 4 | 126.87 | 253.23 |
| 12 | David Hearn | United States | 125.12 | 2 | 127.12 | 127.45 | 4 | 131.45 | 258.57 |
