= Marcela Sadilová =

Czech slalom canoeist (born 1967)

Medal record

Women's canoe slalom

Representing Czechoslovakia

World Championships
Silver medal – second place	1991 Tacen	K1 team

Representing Czech Republic

World Championships
Gold medal – first place	2005 Penrith	K1 team
Silver medal – second place	2002 Bourg St.-Maurice	K1 team
Silver medal – second place	2007 Foz do Iguaçu	K1 team

European Championships
Gold medal – first place	1996 Augsburg	K1
Gold medal – first place	1996 Augsburg	K1 team
Gold medal – first place	1998 Roudnice nad Labem	K1 team
Silver medal – second place	2000 Mezzana	K1 team

Marcela Sadilová (born 26 February 1967 in Prague) is a Czech slalom canoeist who competed from the early 1990s to the late 2000s. She won four medals in the K1 team event at the ICF Canoe Slalom World Championships with a gold (2005) and three silvers (1991, 2002, 2007). She also won three golds and one silver at the European Championships.

Sadilová also competed in two Summer Olympics, earning her best finish of ninth in the K1 event in Atlanta in 1996.

== World Cup individual podiums ==
	1st place, gold medalist(s)	2nd place, silver medalist(s)	3rd place, bronze medalist(s)	Total
K1	1	3	8	12

Season	Date	Venue	Position	Event
1992	7 June 1992	Merano	3rd	K1
1994	17 July 1994	La Seu d'Urgell	2nd	K1
1994	18 September 1994	Asahi, Aichi	3rd	K1
1996	9 June 1996	La Seu d'Urgell	3rd	K1
1996	25 August 1996	Prague	2nd	K1
1999	24 June 1999	Tacen	2nd	K1
2000	23 July 2000	Prague	3rd	K1
2000	30 July 2000	Augsburg	3rd	K1
2001	10 June 2001	Tacen	1st	K1
2002	28 July 2002	Tacen	3rd	K1
2004	30 May 2004	Merano	3rd	K1
2004	18 July 2004	Augsburg	3rd	K1
