= Manuel Köhler =

Austrian canoeist (born 1969)

Medal record

Men's canoe slalom

Representing Austria

European Championships
Bronze medal – third place	1996 Augsburg	K1 team

Manuel Köhler (born 25 April 1969 in Salzburg) is an Austrian slalom canoeist who competed from the mid-1980s to the early 2000s (decade). He won a bronze medal in the K1 team event at the 1996 European Championships in Augsburg.

Competing in three Summer Olympics, he earned his best finish of sixth in the K1 event in Sydney in 2000.

Since 2009 he participates in kayak expeditions. Some of his trips can be seen on his youtube channel https://www.youtube.com/channel/UC58JGpx0D-SgSjZ_N89hUEA/videos?view_as=subscriber

Currently working as sports and geography teacher on highschool BORG Monsberger in Graz, Austria.

== World Cup individual podiums ==
Season	Date	Venue	Position	Event
1993	1 Aug 1993	Augsburg	2nd	K1
1995	2 Jul 1995	Tacen	2nd	K1
1995	9 Jul 1995	Mezzana	1st	K1
1997	6 Jul 1997	Bratislava	1st	K1
1999	20 Jun 1999	Tacen	3rd	K1
2000	9 Jul 2000	La Seu d'Urgell	3rd	K1
