= Susanne Hirt =

German canoeist

Medal record

Women's canoe slalom

Representing West Germany

Junior World Championships
Gold medal – first place	1990 Tavanasa	K1 team

Representing Germany

World Championships
Gold medal – first place	1999 La Seu d'Urgell	K1 team

European Championships
Bronze medal – third place	2000 Mezzana	K1 team

Susanne Hirt (born 15 August 1973 in Augsburg) is a German slalom canoeist who competed at the international level from 1990 to 2000.

Hirt won a gold medal in the K1 team event at the 1999 ICF Canoe Slalom World Championships in La Seu d'Urgell. She is the overall World Cup champion in K1 from 1999. She also won a bronze medal in the K1 team event at the 2000 European Championships.

Hirt also finished tenth in the K1 event at the 2000 Summer Olympics in Sydney.

== World Cup individual podiums ==
Season	Date	Venue	Position	Event
1999	15 Aug 1999	Bratislava	1st	K1
1999	22 Aug 1999	Augsburg	1st	K1
1999	3 Oct 1999	Penrith	1st	K1
2000	30 Apr 2000	Penrith	3rd	K1
2000	18 Jun 2000	Ocoee	2nd	K1
2000	2 Jul 2000	Saint-Pé-de-Bigorre	3rd	K1
