= André Ehrenberg =

German canoeist (born 1972)

Medal record

Men's canoe slalom

Representing West Germany

Junior World Championships
Bronze medal – third place	1990 Tavanasa	C1 team

Representing Germany

Olympic Games
Bronze medal – third place	1996 Atlanta	C2

World Championships
Silver medal – second place	1997 Três Coroas	C2
Silver medal – second place	2002 Bourg St.-Maurice	C2 team
Silver medal – second place	2003 Augsburg	C2 team
Bronze medal – third place	1995 Nottingham	C2 team
Bronze medal – third place	1997 Três Coroas	C2 team

European Championships
Gold medal – first place	1996 Augsburg	C2 team
Bronze medal – third place	2002 Bratislava	C2 team

André Ehrenberg (born 2 January 1972 in Braunschweig) is a German slalom canoeist who competed at the international level from 1990 to 2003. Competing in two Summer Olympics, he won a bronze medal in the C2 event in Atlanta in 1996.

Ehrenberg also won five medals at the ICF Canoe Slalom World Championships with three silvers (C2: 1997, C2 team: 2002, 2003) and two bronzes (C2 team: 1995, 1997). He earned two more medals at the European Championships (1 gold and 1 bronze).

His partner in the boat throughout the whole of his C2 career was Michael Senft.

== World Cup individual podiums ==
	1st place, gold medalist(s)	2nd place, silver medalist(s)	3rd place, bronze medalist(s)	Total
C2	1	4	6	11

Season	Date	Venue	Position	Event
1994	3 July 1994	Augsburg	3rd	C2
1995	16 July 1995	Lofer	3rd	C2
1996	16 June 1996	Augsburg	3rd	C2
1998	28 June 1998	Augsburg	3rd	C2
1999	15 August 1999	Bratislava	2nd	C2
1999	22 August 1999	Augsburg	2nd	C2
2000	30 July 2000	Augsburg	1st	C2
2001	3 June 2001	Merano	2nd	C2
2001	9 September 2001	Wausau	2nd	C2
2002	26 May 2002	Guangzhou	3rd	C2
2002	28 July 2002	Tacen	3rd	C2
