= Barbara Nadalin =

Italian canoeist

Medal record

Women's canoe slalom

Representing Italy

European Championships
| Bronze medal – third place | 1996 Augsburg | K1 team |

Barbara Nadalin (22 December 1972, in San Vito al Tagliamento – 14 July 2012, in Udine) was an Italian slalom canoeist who competed from the late 1980s to the early 2000s.

She won a bronze medal in the K1 team event at the 1996 European Championships in Augsburg. Nadalin finished 15th in the K1 event at the 1996 Summer Olympics in Atlanta.

== World Cup individual podiums ==
| Season | Date | Venue | Position | Event |
|---|---|---|---|---|
| 1999 | 20 Jun 1999 | Tacen | 3rd | K1 |
