= Miha Štricelj =

Slovenian slalom canoeist

Medal record

Men's canoe slalom

Representing Yugoslavia

Junior World Championships
Bronze medal – third place	1990 Tavanasa	K1 team

Representing Slovenia

World Championships
Silver medal – second place	1999 La Seu d'Urgell	K1 team

European Championships
Silver medal – second place	1996 Augsburg	K1 team

Junior World Championships
Gold medal – first place	1992 Sjoa	K1 team

Miha Štricelj (born 6.6.1974 in Tacen) is a Slovenian slalom canoeist who competed at the international level from 1990 to 1999.

He won a silver medal in the K1 team event at the 1999 ICF Canoe Slalom World Championships in La Seu d'Urgell and also at the 1996 European Championships in Augsburg

== World Cup individual podiums ==
Season	Date	Venue	Position	Event
1999	20 Jun 1999	Tacen	3rd	K1
