= 1996 European Canoe Slalom Championships =

The 1996 European Canoe Slalom Championships took place in Augsburg, Germany between August 29 and September 1, 1996, under the auspices of the European Canoe Association (ECA). It was the inaugural edition. The races were held on the Eiskanal which also hosted the 1972 Summer Olympics when canoe slalom made its first appearance at the Olympics.

== Medal summary ==
=== Men's results ===
==== Canoe ====
Event	Gold	Points	Silver	Points	Bronze	Points
C1	Simon Hočevar (SLO)	119.40	Sören Kaufmann (GER)	122.06	Martin Lang (GER)	122.36
C1 team	Germany; Sören Kaufmann; Martin Lang; Vitus Husek	143.44	Czech Republic; Pavel Janda; David Jančar; Lukáš Pollert	162.18	Slovenia; Dejan Stevanovič; Simon Hočevar; Sebastjan Linke	165.00
C2	Switzerland; Peter Matti; Ueli Matti	129.85	Czech Republic; Miroslav Šimek; Jiří Rohan	133.42	Poland; Krzysztof Kołomański; Michał Staniszewski	135.55
C2 team	Germany; André Ehrenberg & Michael Senft; Rüdiger Hübbers & Udo Raumann; Manfred Berro & Michael Trummer	168.27	Poland; Jarosław Nawrocki & Konrad Korzeniewski; Andrzej Wójs & Sławomir Mordarski; Krzysztof Kołomański & Michał Staniszewski	177.02	Slovakia; Ľuboš Šoška & Peter Šoška; Milan Kubáň & Marián Olejník; Roman Štrba & Roman Vajs	177.96

==== Kayak ====
Event	Gold	Points	Silver	Points	Bronze	Points
K1	Ian Wiley (IRL)	111.46	Miroslav Stanovský (SVK)	116.45	Jochen Lettmann (GER)	117.56
K1 team	Germany; Jochen Lettmann; Thomas Becker; Thomas Schmidt	131.51	Slovenia; Miha Štricelj; Andraž Vehovar; Jure Pelegrini	134.84	Austria; Günter Martinsich; Manuel Köhler; Helmut Oblinger	136.29

=== Women's results ===
==== Kayak ====
Event	Gold	Points	Silver	Points	Bronze	Points
K1	Marcela Sadilová (CZE)	131.22	Štěpánka Hilgertová (CZE)	133.81	Elena Kaliská (SVK)	135.89
K1 team	Czech Republic; Marcela Sadilová; Štěpánka Hilgertová; Irena Pavelková	156.10	Germany; Kordula Striepecke; Evi Huss; Elisabeth Micheler-Jones	174.09	Italy; Cristina Giai Pron; Barbara Nadalin; Lorenza Lazzarotto	178.26

== Medal table ==
Rank	Nation	Gold	Silver	Bronze	Total
1	Germany (GER)	3	2	2	7
2	Czech Republic (CZE)	2	3	0	5
3	Slovenia (SLO)	1	1	1	3
4	Ireland (IRL)	1	0	0	1
4	Switzerland (SUI)	1	0	0	1
6	Slovakia (SVK)	0	1	2	3
7	Poland (POL)	0	1	1	2
8	Austria (AUT)	0	0	1	1
8	Italy (ITA)	0	0	1	1
Totals (9 entries)		8	8	8	24
