= Sören Kaufmann =

German canoeist

Medal record

Men's canoe slalom

Representing Germany

World Championships
Gold medal – first place	1995 Nottingham	C1 team
Silver medal – second place	1995 Nottingham	C1
Silver medal – second place	2002 Bourg St.-Maurice	C1 team
Bronze medal – third place	1993 Mezzana	C1

European Championships
Gold medal – first place	1996 Augsburg	C1 team
Silver medal – second place	1996 Augsburg	C1
Silver medal – second place	2002 Bratislava	C1 team

Sören Kaufmann (born 8 May 1971 in Augsburg) is a German slalom canoeist who competed from the late 1980s to the mid-2000s (decade). He won four medals at the ICF Canoe Slalom World Championships with a gold (C1 team: 1995), two silvers (C1: 1995, C1 team: 2002), and a bronze (C1: 1993).

He won three medals at the European Championships (1 gold and 2 silvers).

Kaufmann also competed in three Summer Olympics, earning his best finish of sixth in the C1 event in Sydney in 2000.

As of 2017 he is the German national team coach for canoeists.

== World Cup individual podiums ==
Season	Date	Venue	Position	Event
1993	25 Jul 1993	Lofer	3rd	C1
1993	1 Aug 1993	Augsburg	2nd	C1
1994	3 Jul 1994	Augsburg	1st	C1
1996	16 Jun 1996	Augsburg	2nd	C1
2000	2 Jul 2000	Saint-Pé-de-Bigorre	3rd	C1
