= Roman Vajs =

Slovak slalom canoeist (born 1974)

Personal information
- Nationality: Slovak
- Born: 18 November 1974 (age 51) Liptovský Mikuláš, Czechoslovakia
- Height: 1.75 m (5 ft 9 in)
- Weight: 72 kg (159 lb)

Sport
- Country: Slovakia
- Sport: Canoe slalom
- Event: C2
Medal record
Men's canoe slalom
Representing Czechoslovakia
Junior World Championships
Gold medal – first place	1992 Sjoa	C2
Representing Slovakia
World Championships
Silver medal – second place	1999 La Seu d'Urgell	C2 team
Bronze medal – third place	1993 Mezzana	C2 team
European Championships
Gold medal – first place	2002 Bratislava	C2 team
Silver medal – second place	1998 Roudnice nad Labem	C2 team
Bronze medal – third place	1996 Augsburg	C2 team

Roman Vajs (born 18 November 1974 in Liptovský Mikuláš) is a retired Slovak slalom canoeist who competed at the international level from 1990 to 2004, specializing in the C2 discipline.

Vajs won two medals in the C2 team event at the ICF Canoe Slalom World Championships with a silver in 1999 and a bronze in 1993. He won the overall World Cup title in the C2 class in 1998. He also won 3 medals at the European Championships (1 gold, 1 silver and 1 bronze).

Vajs finished 13th in the C2 event at the 1996 Summer Olympics in Atlanta.

His partner in the C2 boat until 2000 was Roman Štrba, who was paralyzed in an accident in March 2001. In the years after Štrba's accident, Vajs teamed up with Pavol Hric who had competed in K1 until then.

== Career statistics ==
=== Major championships results timeline ===
Event		1993	1994	1995	1996	1997	1998	1999	2000	2001	2002	2003
Olympic Games	C2	Not held			13	Not held			—	Not held		
World Championships	C2	12	Not held	9	Not held	9	Not held	18	Not held		18	15
World Championships	C2 team	3	Not held	4	Not held	4	Not held	2	Not held		6	6
European Championships	C2	Not held			6	Not held	13	Not held	7	Not held	5	Not held
European Championships	C2 team	Not held			3	Not held	2	Not held	2 (Note: Not a medal event due to low number of participating nations)	Not held	1	Not held

=== World Cup individual podiums ===
Season	Date	Venue	Position	Event
1995	2 Jul 1995	Tacen	3rd	C2
1998	21 Jun 1998	Tacen	2nd	C2
1998	13 Sep 1998	La Seu d'Urgell	1st	C2
1999	24 Jun 1999	Tacen	3rd	C2
1999	15 Aug 1999	Bratislava	3rd	C2
2002	28 Jul 2002	Tacen	1st	C2
