= Jiří Prskavec =

Jiří Prskavec may refer to:

- Jiří Prskavec (canoeist, born 1993), Czech canoeist, son of canoeist, born 1972
- Jiří Prskavec (canoeist, born 1972), Czech canoeist, father of canoeist, born 1993
