= Estanguet =

Estanguet is a surname. Notable people with the surname include:

- Patrice Estanguet (born 1973), French slalom canoer, brother of Tony
- Tony Estanguet (born 1978), French slalom canoer
