= Emmanuel Brugvin =

French slalom canoeist

Medal record

Men's canoe slalom

Representing France

World Championships
Gold medal – first place	1999 La Seu d'Urgell	C1
Silver medal – second place	1991 Tacen	C1 team
Silver medal – second place	2003 Augsburg	C1 team
Bronze medal – third place	1999 La Seu d'Urgell	C1 team

Emmanuel Brugvin (born 14 December 1970 in Nantes) is a French slalom canoeist who competed from the mid-1980s to the mid-2000s (decade). He won four medals at the ICF Canoe Slalom World Championships with a gold (C1: 1999), two silvers (C1 team: 1991, 2003), and a bronze (C1 team: 1999).

Brugvin also competed in three Summer Olympics, earning his best finish of fourth in the C1 event in Sydney in 2000.

== World Cup individual podiums ==
	1st place, gold medalist(s)	2nd place, silver medalist(s)	3rd place, bronze medalist(s)	Total
C1	4	2	4	10

Season	Date	Venue	Position	Event
1990	18 August 1990	Bourg St.-Maurice	1st	C1
1993	1 August 1993	Augsburg	3rd	C1
1993	21 August 1993	Minden	2nd	C1
1994	3 July 1994	Augsburg	3rd	C1
1995	16 July 1995	Lofer	1st	C1
1995	1 October 1995	Ocoee	3rd	C1
1996	21 April 1996	Ocoee	3rd	C1
1998	14 June 1998	Liptovský Mikuláš	1st	C1
1998	2 August 1998	Wausau	1st	C1
2000	2 July 2000	Saint-Pé-de-Bigorre	2nd	C1
