= Enrico Lazzarotto =

Italian slalom canoeist (born 1973)

Medal record

Men's canoe slalom

Representing Italy

European Championships
Gold medal – first place	2000 Mezzana	K1 team

Enrico Lazzarotto (born 14 January 1973 in Bassano del Grappa) is an Italian slalom canoeist who competed from the early 1990s to the mid-2000s.

He won a gold medal in the K1 team event at the 2000 European Championships in Mezzana.

He finished 14th in the K1 event at the 2000 Summer Olympics in Sydney.

== World Cup individual podiums ==
Season	Date	Venue	Position	Event
1996	25 Aug 1996	Prague	1st	K1
1998	28 Jun 1998	Augsburg	2nd	K1
1999	22 Aug 1999	Augsburg	2nd	K1
