= Cristina Martínez (canoeist) =

Spanish canoeist

Medal record

Women's canoe slalom

Representing Spain

Junior World Championships
Bronze medal – third place	1990 Tavanasa	K1 team

Cristina Martínez Arrieta (born 8 October 1972 in San Sebastián) is a Spanish slalom canoeist who competed at the international level from 1990 to 1996.

Competing in two Summer Olympics, she earned her best finish of 17th in the K1 event in Barcelona in 1992.
