= 1990 World Junior Canoe Slalom Championships =

The 1990 ICF World Junior Canoe Slalom Championships were the 3rd edition of the ICF World Junior Canoe Slalom Championships. The event took place in Tavanasa, Switzerland from 13 to 22 July 1990 under the auspices of the International Canoe Federation (ICF).

Seven medal events took place. The C2 team event was not held. It was the first time that team events were part of the world junior championships.

== Medal summary ==
=== Men ===
==== Canoe ====
Event	Gold		Silver		Bronze	
C1	Danko Herceg (YUG)	189.81	Patrice Estanguet (FRA)	190.55	Adam Clawson (USA)	194.38
C1 team	France; Patrice Estanguet; David Gemmi; Benoît Guiraud	234.71	Yugoslavia; Simon Hočevar; Danko Herceg; Jaka Marušič	245.30	West Germany; Manfred Reinig; André Ehrenberg; Vitus Husek	252.78
C2	Krzysztof Kołomański/Michał Staniszewski (POL)	212.05	Alexandre Lauvergne/Nathanael Fouquet (FRA)	221.68	Ladislav Šmakal/David Svoboda (TCH)	234.39

==== Kayak ====
Event	Gold		Silver		Bronze	
K1	Alexandr Adámek (TCH)	180.51	Peter Buckley (GBR)	180.73	Jiří Prskavec (TCH)	181.25
K1 team	West Germany; Lutz Jogwer; Oliver Fix; Mark Haverkamp	204.50	Czechoslovakia; Ondřej Raab; Jiří Prskavec; Alexandr Adámek	206.94	Yugoslavia; Jure Pelegrini; Miha Štricelj; Andraž Vehovar	211.95

=== Women ===
==== Kayak ====
Event	Gold		Silver		Bronze	
K1	Angela Radermacher (FRG)	204.90	Irena Pavelková (TCH)	209.35	Urša Breznik (YUG)	213.16
K1 team	West Germany; Evi Huss; Angela Radermacher; Susanne Hirt	239.81	Czechoslovakia; Petra Plavjaniková; Elena Kaliská; Irena Pavelková	261.47	Spain; María Eizmendi; Cristina Martínez; Arene Leizaola	269.48

== Medal table ==
Rank	Nation	Gold	Silver	Bronze	Total
1	West Germany (FRG)	3	0	1	4
2	Czechoslovakia (TCH)	1	3	2	6
3	France (FRA)	1	2	0	3
4	Yugoslavia (YUG)	1	1	2	4
5	Poland (POL)	1	0	0	1
6	Great Britain (GBR)	0	1	0	1
7	Spain (ESP)	0	0	1	1
7	United States (USA)	0	0	1	1
Totals (8 entries)		7	7	7	21
