= Vojtěch Bareš =

Czech canoe slalom racer (born 1974)

Medal record

Men's canoe slalom

Representing Czech Republic

World Championships
Bronze medal – third place	1993 Mezzana	K1 team
Bronze medal – third place	1999 La Seu d'Urgell	K1 team

European Championships
Silver medal – second place	1998 Roudnice nad Labem	K1 team

Vojtěch Bareš (born 1974) is a Czech slalom canoeist who competed in the 1990s and early 2000s.

He won two bronze medals in the K1 team event at the ICF Canoe Slalom World Championships, earning them in 1993 and 1999. He also won a silver medal in the K1 team event at the 1998 European Championships in Roudnice nad Labem.

== World Cup individual podiums ==
Season	Date	Venue	Position	Event
1999	15 Aug 1999	Bratislava	3rd	K1
