= Mariusz Wieczorek =

Polish slalom canoeist (born 1976)

Medal record

Men's canoe slalom

Representing Poland

World Championships
Gold medal – first place	1999 La Seu d'Urgell	C1 team

European Championships
Gold medal – first place	2002 Bratislava	C1
Bronze medal – third place	2002 Bratislava	C1 team

Junior World Championships
Gold medal – first place	1992 Sjoa	C1 team
Silver medal – second place	1994 Wausau	C1

Mariusz Krzysztof Wieczorek (born 14 March 1976 in Opoczno) is a Polish slalom canoeist who competed at the international level from 1992 to 2005.

He won a gold medal in the C1 team event at the 1999 ICF Canoe Slalom World Championships in La Seu d'Urgell. He also won an individual gold and a team bronze at the 2002 European Championships in Bratislava.

Wieczorek competed in two Summer Olympics, earning his best finish of 11th in the C1 event in Atlanta in 1996.

== World Cup individual podiums ==
Season	Date	Venue	Position	Event
1999	24 Jun 1999	Tacen	2nd	C1
2001	27 May 2001	Goumois	2nd	C1
2001	5 Aug 2001	Prague	3rd	C1
2005	9 Jul 2005	Athens	1st	C1
