= Simon Hočevar =

Slovenian canoeist (born 1974)

Medal record

Men's canoe slalom

Representing Yugoslavia

Junior World Championships
Silver medal – second place	1990 Tavanasa	C1 team

Representing Slovenia

World Championships
Gold medal – first place	1993 Mezzana	C1 team
Bronze medal – third place	1997 Três Coroas	C1 team
Bronze medal – third place	2002 Bourg St.-Maurice	C1 team

European Championships
Gold medal – first place	1996 Augsburg	C1
Bronze medal – third place	1996 Augsburg	C1 team
Bronze medal – third place	2004 Skopje	C1 team

Junior World Championships
Gold medal – first place	1992 Sjoa	C1
Bronze medal – third place	1992 Sjoa	C1 team

Simon Hočevar (born 27 February 1974 in Ljubljana) is a Slovenian slalom canoeist who competed at the international level from 1990 to 2012.

Hočevar won three medals in the C1 team event at the ICF Canoe Slalom World Championships with a gold (1993) and two bronzes (1997, 2002). He also won three medals at the European Championships (1 gold and 2 bronzes).

Hočevar competed in three Summer Olympics, earning his best finish of sixth in the C1 event in Athens in 2004.

His daughter Eva Alina Hočevar and his son Žiga Lin Hočevar are also successful slalom canoeists.

== World Cup individual podiums ==
Season	Date	Venue	Position	Event
2001	10 Jun 2001	Tacen	3rd	C1
2003	13 Jul 2003	Tacen	2nd	C1
