= 1999 ICF Canoe Slalom World Championships =

Canoe slalom event in La Seu d'Urgell, Catalonia, Spain

The 1999 ICF Canoe Slalom World Championships were held in La Seu d'Urgell, Catalonia, Spain under the auspices of International Canoe Federation at the Segre Olympic Park. It was the 26th edition. A record eleven nations won medals at these championships.

== Medal summary ==
=== Men's ===
==== Canoe ====
Event	Gold	Points	Silver	Points	Bronze	Points
C1	Emmanuel Brugvin (FRA)	205.84	Robin Bell (AUS)	206.45	Michal Martikán (SVK)	207.00
C1 team	Poland; Krzysztof Bieryt; Sławomir Mordarski; Mariusz Wieczorek	121.70	Germany; Stefan Pfannmöller; Nico Bettge; Martin Lang	121.87	France; Patrice Estanguet; Emmanuel Brugvin; Tony Estanguet	125.32
C2	Czech Republic; Marek Jiras; Tomáš Máder	224.46	Poland; Krzysztof Kołomański; Michał Staniszewski	225.30	France; Éric Biau; Bertrand Daille	228.44
C2 team	Czech Republic; Marek Jiras & Tomáš Máder; Jaroslav Volf & Ondřej Štěpánek; Jaroslav Pospíšil & Jaroslav Pollert	127.40	Slovakia; Roman Štrba & Roman Vajs; Milan Kubáň & Marián Olejník; Pavol Hochschorner & Peter Hochschorner	131.86	France; Frank Adisson & Wilfrid Forgues; Éric Biau & Bertrand Daille; Philippe Quémerais & Yann Le Pennec	135.34

==== Kayak ====
Event	Gold	Points	Silver	Points	Bronze	Points
K1	David Ford (CAN)	198.53	Scott Shipley (USA)	198.99	Paul Ratcliffe (GBR)	199.13
K1 team	Germany; Thomas Becker; Ralf Schaberg; Jakobus Stenglein	114.52	Slovenia; Andraž Vehovar; Fedja Marušič; Miha Štricelj	116.12	Czech Republic; Tomáš Kobes; Jiří Prskavec; Vojtěch Bareš	116.29

=== Women's ===
==== Kayak ====
Event	Gold	Points	Silver	Points	Bronze	Points
K1	Štěpánka Hilgertová (CZE)	226.30	Beata Grzesik (POL)	228.62	Sandra Friedli (SUI)	229.58
K1 team	Germany; Susanne Hirt; Evi Huss; Mandy Planert	139.18	United States; Mary Marshall Seaver; Rebecca Bennett; Sarah Leith	142.34	United Kingdom; Heather Corrie; Rachel Crosbee; Amy Casson	143.41

== Medals table ==
Rank	Nation	Gold	Silver	Bronze	Total
1	Czech Republic (CZE)	3	0	1	4
2	Germany (GER)	2	1	0	3
3	Poland (POL)	1	2	0	3
4	France (FRA)	1	0	3	4
5	Canada (CAN)	1	0	0	1
6	United States (USA)	0	2	0	2
7	Slovakia (SVK)	0	1	1	2
8	Australia (AUS)	0	1	0	1
8	Slovenia (SLO)	0	1	0	1
10	Great Britain (GBR)	0	0	2	2
11	Switzerland (SUI)	0	0	1	1
Totals (11 entries)		8	8	8	24
