= Sandra Friedli =

Swiss slalom canoeist (born 1974)

Medal record

Women's canoe slalom

Representing Switzerland

World Championships
Bronze medal – third place	1999 La Seu d'Urgell	K1

European Championships
Bronze medal – third place	1998 Roudnice nad Labem	K1

Sandra Friedli (born 25 October 1974) is a Swiss slalom canoeist who competed from the early 1990s to the early 2000s (decade).

She won a bronze medal in the K1 event at the 1999 ICF Canoe Slalom World Championships in La Seu d'Urgell and also at the 1998 European Championships in Roudnice nad Labem.

Friedli also competed in two Summer Olympics, earning her best finish of ninth in the K1 event in Sydney in 2000.

== World Cup individual podiums ==
Season	Date	Venue	Position	Event
1998	28 Jun 1998	Augsburg	1st	K1
1999	22 Aug 1999	Augsburg	3rd	K1
