= Mary Marshall Seaver =

American slalom canoeist

Medal record

Women's canoe slalom

Representing United States

World Championships
Silver medal – second place	1999 La Seu d'Urgell	K-1 team

Mary Marshall Seaver is an American slalom canoeist who competed from the late 1990s to the mid-2000s. She won a silver medal in the K-1 team event at the 1999 ICF Canoe Slalom World Championships in La Seu d'Urgell.
