= Jean-Yves Cheutin =

Medal record

Men's canoe slalom

Representing France

Junior World Championships
Bronze medal – third place	1992 Sjoa	K1 team

Jean-Yves Cheutin (born 11 September 1974, in Oyonnax) is a French slalom canoeist who competed at the international level from 1992 to 2003. He retired in 2004 and became a national team coach.

Cheutin finished 23rd in the K1 event at the 1996 Summer Olympics in Atlanta.

== World Cup individual podiums ==
Season	Date	Venue	Position	Event
2000	18 Jun 2000	Ocoee	2nd	K1
