= Amy Casson =

British slalom canoeist

Medal record

Women's canoe slalom

Representing Great Britain

World Championships
Bronze medal – third place	1999 La Seu d'Urgell	K-1 team

Amy Casson is a British slalom canoeist who competed from the late 1990s to the early 2000s. She won a bronze medal in the K-1 team event at the 1999 ICF Canoe Slalom World Championships in La Seu d'Urgell.
