= 1992 World Junior Canoe Slalom Championships =

The 1992 ICF World Junior Canoe Slalom Championships were the 4th edition of the ICF World Junior Canoe Slalom Championships. The event took place on the Sjoa river in Norway from 5 to 12 July 1992 under the auspices of the International Canoe Federation (ICF).

Seven medal events took place. The C2 team event was not held.

== Medal summary ==
=== Men ===
==== Canoe ====
Event	Gold		Silver		Bronze	
C1	Simon Hočevar (SLO)	177.07	David Jančar (TCH)	195.91	Justin Boocock (AUS)	196.71
C1 team	Poland; Grzegorz Sierota; Mariusz Wieczorek; Krzysztof Bieryt	261.66	Czechoslovakia; David Jančar; Pavel Janda; Jan Růžička	269.69	Slovenia; Simon Hočevar; Dejan Stevanovič; Matej Hočevar	308.26
C2	Roman Štrba/Roman Vajs (TCH)	201.88	Marek Jiras/Tomáš Máder (TCH)	213.81	Pierre Luquet/Christophe Luquet (FRA)	226.57

==== Kayak ====
Event	Gold		Silver		Bronze	
K1	James Croft (GBR)	163.47	Dejan Kralj (SLO)	166.69	Gustavo Selbach (BRA)	169.79
K1 team	Slovenia; Miha Štricelj; Dejan Kralj; Uroš Kodelja	218.14	United States; Brent Wiesel; John Eric Southwick; John Trujillo	221.61	France; Jean-Yves Cheutin; Yann Le Pennec; Thierry Cadene	222.19

=== Women ===
==== Kayak ====
Event	Gold		Silver		Bronze	
K1	Cristina Giai Pron (ITA)	186.34	Claudia Heiz (SUI)	196.73	Irena Pavelková (TCH)	202.30
K1 team	Czechoslovakia; Irena Pavelková; Petra Plavjaniková; Petra Koudelová	253.63	Germany; Evi Huss; Mandy Planert; Phillis Ahlfaenger	268.82	Canada; Ina Kerckhoff; Saskia van Mourik; Jennifer Gratto	269.86

== Medal table ==
Rank	Nation	Gold	Silver	Bronze	Total
1	Czechoslovakia (TCH)	2	3	1	6
2	Slovenia (SLO)	2	1	1	4
3	Great Britain (GBR)	1	0	0	1
3	Italy (ITA)	1	0	0	1
3	Poland (POL)	1	0	0	1
6	Germany (GER)	0	1	0	1
6	Switzerland (SUI)	0	1	0	1
6	United States (USA)	0	1	0	1
9	France (FRA)	0	0	2	2
10	Australia (AUS)	0	0	1	1
10	Brazil (BRA)	0	0	1	1
10	Canada (CAN)	0	0	1	1
Totals (12 entries)		7	7	7	21
