= Floris Braat =

Dutch slalom canoeist (born 1979)

Medal record

Men's canoe slalom

Representing Netherlands

World Championships
Silver medal – second place	2003 Augsburg	K1 team

Junior World Championships
Silver medal – second place	1996 Lipno	K1

Junior European Championships
Gold medal – first place	1997 Nowy Sącz	K1

Floris Braat (born 29 September 1979, in Eindhoven) is a Dutch slalom canoeist who competed at the international level from 1994 to 2004.

Braat started his canoe racing career at the age of 10 in Eindhoven, the Netherlands. At the age of 14, he was the youngest participant at the 1994 Junior World Championships in Wausau, where he finished in 18th position in the K1 event.

He achieved his biggest success by winning the World Cup race in La Seu d'Urgell, Spain in 2000. He also won a silver medal in the K1 team event at the 2003 ICF Canoe Slalom World Championships in Augsburg.

Braat represented the Netherlands at the 2004 Summer Olympics in Athens, where he finished in 17th position after reaching the semi-finals in the K1 event. His effort was not enough to reach the finals.

== World Cup individual podiums ==
Season	Date	Venue	Position	Event
2000	9 Jul 2000	La Seu d'Urgell	1st	K1
