= Krzysztof Bieryt =

Polish slalom canoeist

Medal record

Men's canoe slalom

Representing Poland

World Championships
Gold medal – first place	1999 La Seu d'Urgell	C1 team

European Championships
Silver medal – second place	2004 Skopje	C1
Silver medal – second place	2008 Kraków	C1 team
Bronze medal – third place	2002 Bratislava	C1 team

Junior World Championships
Gold medal – first place	1992 Sjoa	C1 team

Krysztof Dariusz Bieryt (born 17 May 1974 in Nowy Sącz) is a Polish slalom canoeist who competed at the international level from 1990 to 2009.

He won a gold medal in the C1 team event at the 1999 ICF Canoe Slalom World Championships in La Seu d'Urgell. He also won two silvers and a bronze at the European Championships.

Bieryt competed in three Summer Olympics, earning his best finish of eighth in the C1 event in Beijing in 2008.

== World Cup individual podiums ==
Season	Date	Venue	Position	Event
1998	14 Jun 1998	Liptovský Mikuláš	2nd	C1
2001	10 Jun 2001	Tacen	2nd	C1
2001	5 Aug 2001	Prague	1st	C1
2002	4 Aug 2002	Prague	1st	C1
2008	6 Jul 2008	Augsburg	3rd	C1
