= Rebecca Giddens =

American kayaker

Personal information
- Born: September 19, 1977 (age 48) Green Bay, Wisconsin, U.S.
Medal record
Women's canoe slalom
Representing United States
Olympic Games
Silver medal – second place	2004 Athens	K1
World Championships
Gold medal – first place	2002 Bourg St.-Maurice	K1
Silver medal – second place	1999 La Seu d'Urgell	K1 team
Bronze medal – third place	2003 Augsburg	K1

Rebecca Giddens (née Bennett, born September 19, 1977) is a United States slalom kayaker who competed from the mid-1990s to the mid-2000s.

Competing in two Summer Olympics, she won a silver medal in the K1 event in Athens in 2004. Giddens also won three medals at the ICF Canoe Slalom World Championships with a gold (K1: 2002) a silver (K1 team: 1999) and a bronze (K1: 2003).

Giddens was born in Green Bay, Wisconsin, and resides in Kernville, California, where she owns a brewpub with her husband, Eric. Her husband finished 20th in the men's K1 event at the 1996 Summer Olympics in Atlanta.

== World Cup individual podiums ==
Season	Date	Venue	Position	Event
2000	18 Jun 2000	Ocoee	1st	K1
2000	9 Jul 2000	La Seu d'Urgell	1st	K1
2001	9 Sep 2001	Wausau	3rd	K1
2002	4 Aug 2002	Prague	1st	K1
2003	11 May 2003	Penrith	1st	K1
2003	6 Jul 2003	La Seu d'Urgell	2nd	K1
