= Sarah Leith Bahn =

American canoeist

Medal record

Women's canoe slalom

Representing United States

World Championships
| Silver medal – second place | 1999 La Seu d'Urgell | K-1 team |

Sarah Leith Bahn is an American slalom canoeist who competed from the mid-1990s to the mid-2000s. She won a silver medal in the K-1 team event at the 1999 ICF Canoe Slalom World Championships in La Seu d'Urgell. She retired from whitewater slalom in 2004.

She is married to fellow canoeist Ryan Bahn.
