= Ondřej Raab =

Czech slalom canoeist (born 1973)

Medal record

Men's canoe slalom

Representing Czechoslovakia

Junior World Championships
Silver medal – second place	1990 Tavanasa	K1 team

Representing Czech Republic

European Championships
Silver medal – second place	1998 Roudnice nad Labem	K1 team
Silver medal – second place	2002 Bratislava	K1 team

Ondřej Raab (born 20 June 1973 in Jablonec nad Nisou) is a Czech slalom canoeist who competed at the international level from 1990 to 2006.

He won two silver medals in the K1 team event at the European Championships.

Competing at the 2004 Summer Olympics in Athens in the K-1 event, he finished ninth in the qualification round, thus progressing to the semifinals. In the semifinals he finished fourteenth, failing to reach the top ten and the final round.
