= Jiří Prskavec (canoeist, born 1972) =

Czech slalom canoeist (born 1972)

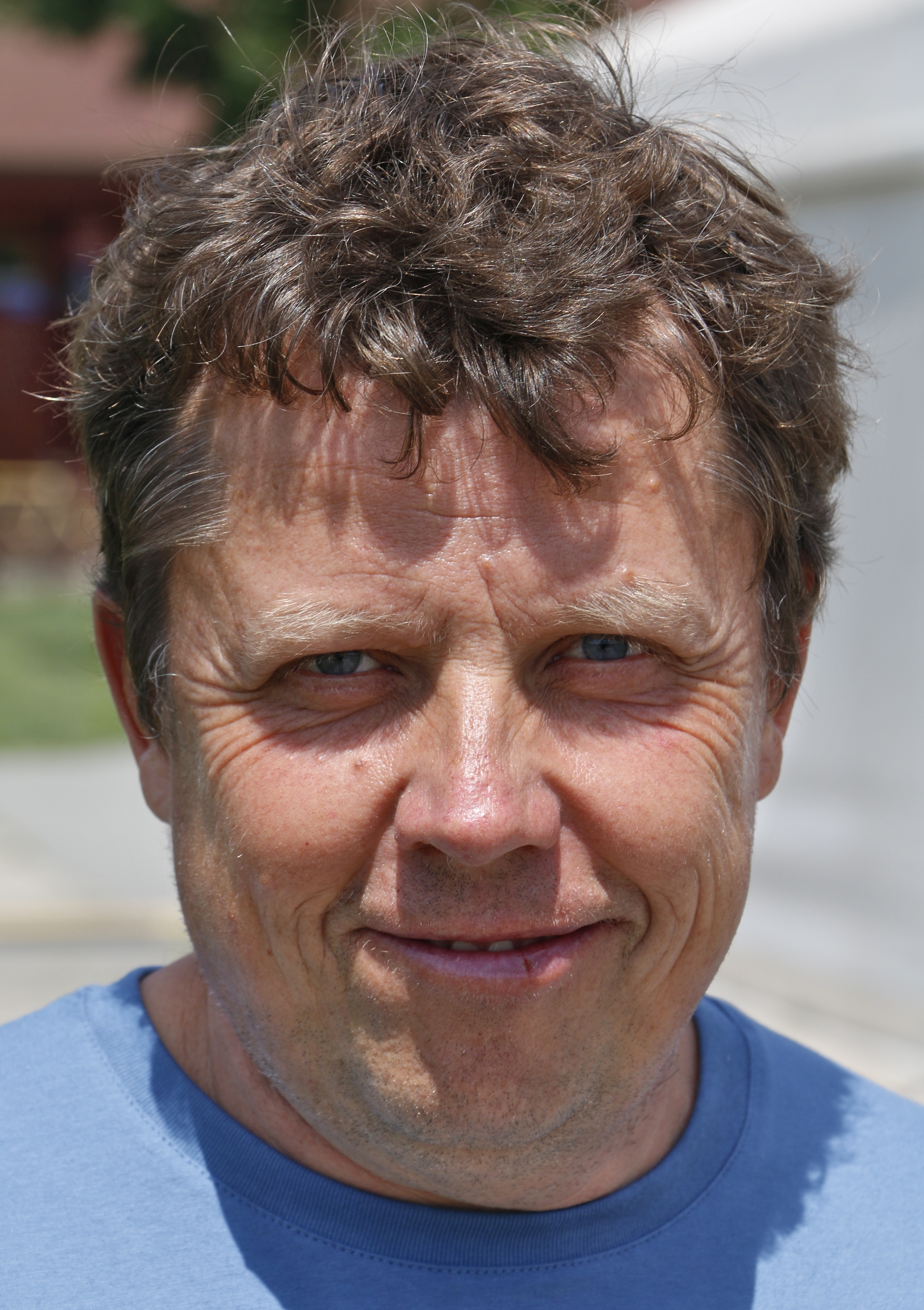

Medal record

Men's canoe slalom

Representing Czechoslovakia

Junior World Championships
| Silver medal – second place | 1990 Tavanasa | K1 team |
| Bronze medal – third place | 1990 Tavanasa | K1 |

Representing Czech Republic

World Championships
| Bronze medal – third place | 1995 Nottingham | K1 |
| Bronze medal – third place | 1999 La Seu d'Urgell | K1 team |

European Championships
| Silver medal – second place | 1998 Roudnice nad Labem | K1 team |

Jiří Prskavec (born 2 May 1972 in Jablonec nad Nisou) is a Czech slalom canoeist who competed at the international level from the 1988 to 2002.

He won two bronze medals at the ICF Canoe Slalom World Championships (K1: 1995, K1 team: 1999). He also won a silver medal in the K1 team event at the 1998 European Championships in Roudnice nad Labem.

Prskavec also competed in two Summer Olympics, earning his best finish of 13th in the K1 event in Sydney in 2000.

His son Jiří is also a slalom canoeist and a medalist from Olympic, World and European championships.
