= María Eizmendi =

Spanish canoeist

Medal record

Women's canoe slalom

Representing Spain

Junior World Championships
Bronze medal – third place	1990 Tavanasa	K1 team

María Eizmendi Pérez (born 14 February 1972 in San Sebastián) is a Spanish slalom canoeist who competed at the international level from 1988 to 2000.

Competing in three Summer Olympics, she earned her best finish of 14th twice in the K1 event (1992, 2000).

== World Cup individual podiums ==
Season	Date	Venue	Position	Event
1998	13 Sep 1998	La Seu d'Urgell	2nd	K1
