= Três Coroas =

Municipality of Rio Grande do Sul, Brazil

- Municipality
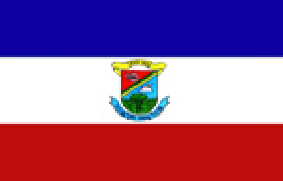
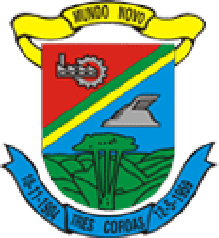
- Flag Coat of arms

- Location within Rio Grande do Sul

- Location in Brazil
- Coordinates: 29°30′55″S 50°46′46″W
- Country: Brazil
- State: Rio Grande do Sul

Population (2024)
  - Total: 24,420
- Time zone: UTC−3 (BRT)
- Postal code: 95660-000
- Area/distance code: +55 51
- Website: www.trescoroas.rs.gov.br

Três Coroas is a municipality in Brazil, located in the state of Rio Grande do Sul. Its population is estimated at 24,420 (2024).
