= Penrith Whitewater Stadium =

White water sports venue near Sydney, Australia

Coordinates: 33.7205°S 150.6835°E

About
- Locale: Cranebrook, Australia
- Designer: Hydrostadium
- Main shape: Loop
- Adjustable: Yes
- Water source: Penrith Lakes
- Pumped: Five of six pumps
- Practice pool: Yes
- Canoe lift: Yes
- Facilities: Yes
- Opening date: March 1999

Stats
- Length: 320 m (1,050 ft)
- Drop: 5.5 m (18 ft)
- Slope: 1.7% (91 ft/mile)
- Flowrate: 14 m^{3}/s (490 cu ft/s)

The Penrith Whitewater Stadium is an artificial whitewater sporting facility located near Sydney, Australia.

== Operations ==
It is an artificial whitewater sporting facility which hosted the canoe/kayak slalom events at the 2000 Summer Olympics in Sydney. The facility is part of the Penrith Lakes Scheme, which is converting open-pit sand and gravel mines into lakes for recreation. It is close to Cranebrook and is adjacent to the Sydney International Regatta Centre. These lakes are not filled via the Nepean River, but are filled via rain water and ground water. The operation of the facility aerates the water and improves water quality in the flat water rowing and canoeing course.

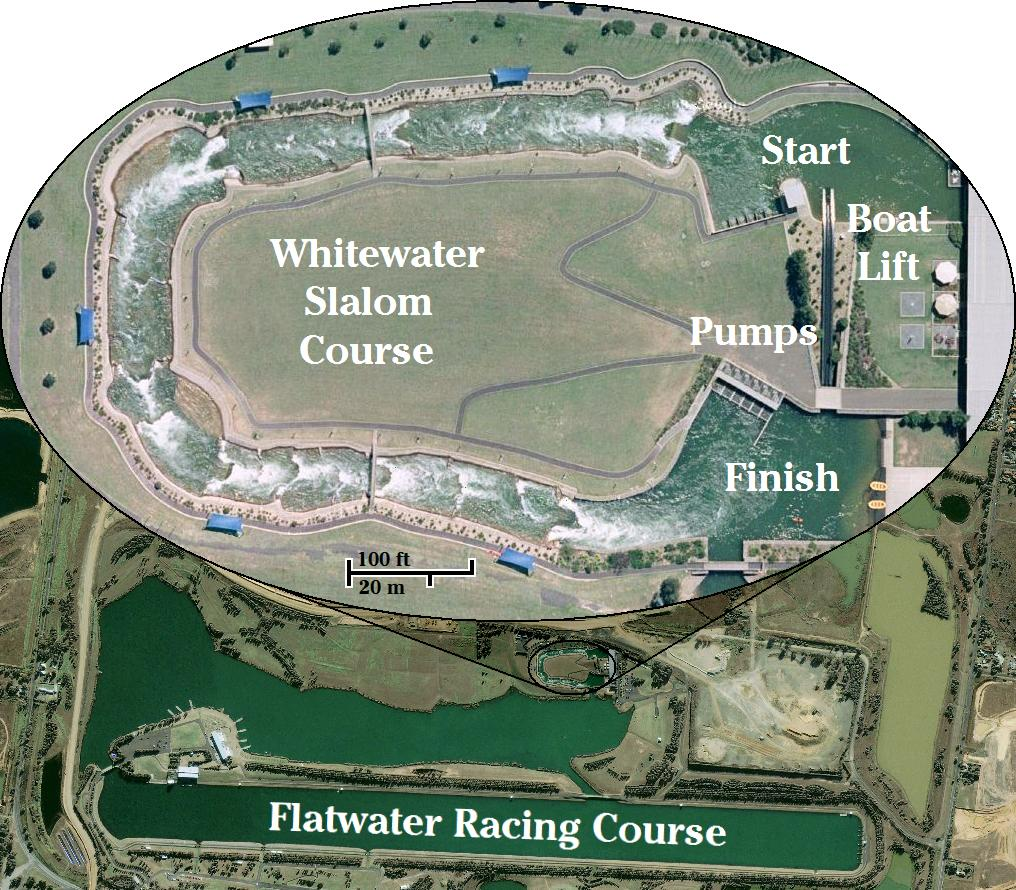

== Design and construction ==
The course is in the shape of a massive 'U', 320 metres in length, between 0.8 and 1.2 metres deep and between eight and 12 metres wide. The overall drop from top to bottom is 5.5 metres. During events a conveyor belt is used to take boats, and their occupants, from the finishing pool back to the start.

As the course has been built in a relatively flat area (flood plain), it has been built up and landscaped to create the sloping course necessary for the required rapids. By design only five of the six available 300-kilowatt pumps are needed to lift the water from the bottom to the start of the course, at the rate of 14 m³/s. This leaves one pump spare for maintenance.

The channel is constructed from concrete with sloping sides. A special blend of concrete was developed to demonstrate sustainability of construction. Very high rates of replacement of cement by power station fly ash were used for the first time in Australia. Large granite boulders are used to shape the water course, as well as a system of movable obstacles which may be used for varying the difficulty of the course and for fine-tuning of the rapids.

The total cost of construction was $AU6 million, of which $1.5 million was paid by Penrith City Council, $1.5 million by the International Canoe Federation (including $300,000 by Australian Canoeing) and $3 million by the Government of New South Wales.

== Facilities and uses ==
The facility, which includes a cafe, is a popular recreational area, offering large rubber raft rides, as well as individual kayaking/canoeing. It is regularly used for local, national and international canoeing/slalom events. It is accessed via McCarthys Lane, which runs off Castlereagh Road, Cranebrook.

It served as the host venue for the 2005 ICF Canoe Slalom World Championships and the 2025 ICF Canoe Slalom World Championships.

It also hosted the 2014 Junior/U-23 ICF Canoe Slalom World Championships.

== Management ==
On 1 July 2023, the NSW Office of Sport took over operation of venue.

== See also ==
- Olympic Canoe/Kayak Slalom Centre (Athens)
- 2000 Summer Olympics venues
