= Tacen Whitewater Course =

Venue for canoe and kayak slalom competition in Tacen, Slovenia

Coordinates: 46.1169°N 14.4577°E

Tacen Whitewater Slalom Course

About
- Locale: Ljubljana, Slovenia
- Managing agent: Tacen Kayak Canoe Club
- Main shape: Linear
- Adjustable: No
- Water source: Sava River
- Pumped: No
- Flow diversion: Yes
- Grandstands: Concrete bleachers
- Canoe lift: No
- Facilities: Yes
- Construction: 1990

Stats
- Length: 275 metres (902 ft)

The Tacen Whitewater Course is a venue for canoe and kayak slalom competition in Tacen, Slovenia, a suburb of Ljubljana. Located on the Sava River, eight kilometers northwest of the city center, it is known locally as Kayak Canoe Club Tacen (Slovene: Kajak kanu klub Tacen). The course played an important role in development of the sport during the past six decades. In 1939, when its first competition was held, it was a natural rapid at the base of a dam in the Sava River. In 1990, after many upgrades, it was given a concrete channel and the features of a modern Olympic-style slalom course. The course now starts in the lake behind the dam, and the spillway is the first drop. Tacen hosts a major international competition almost every year, examples being the 1955, the 1991, and the 2010 Championships.

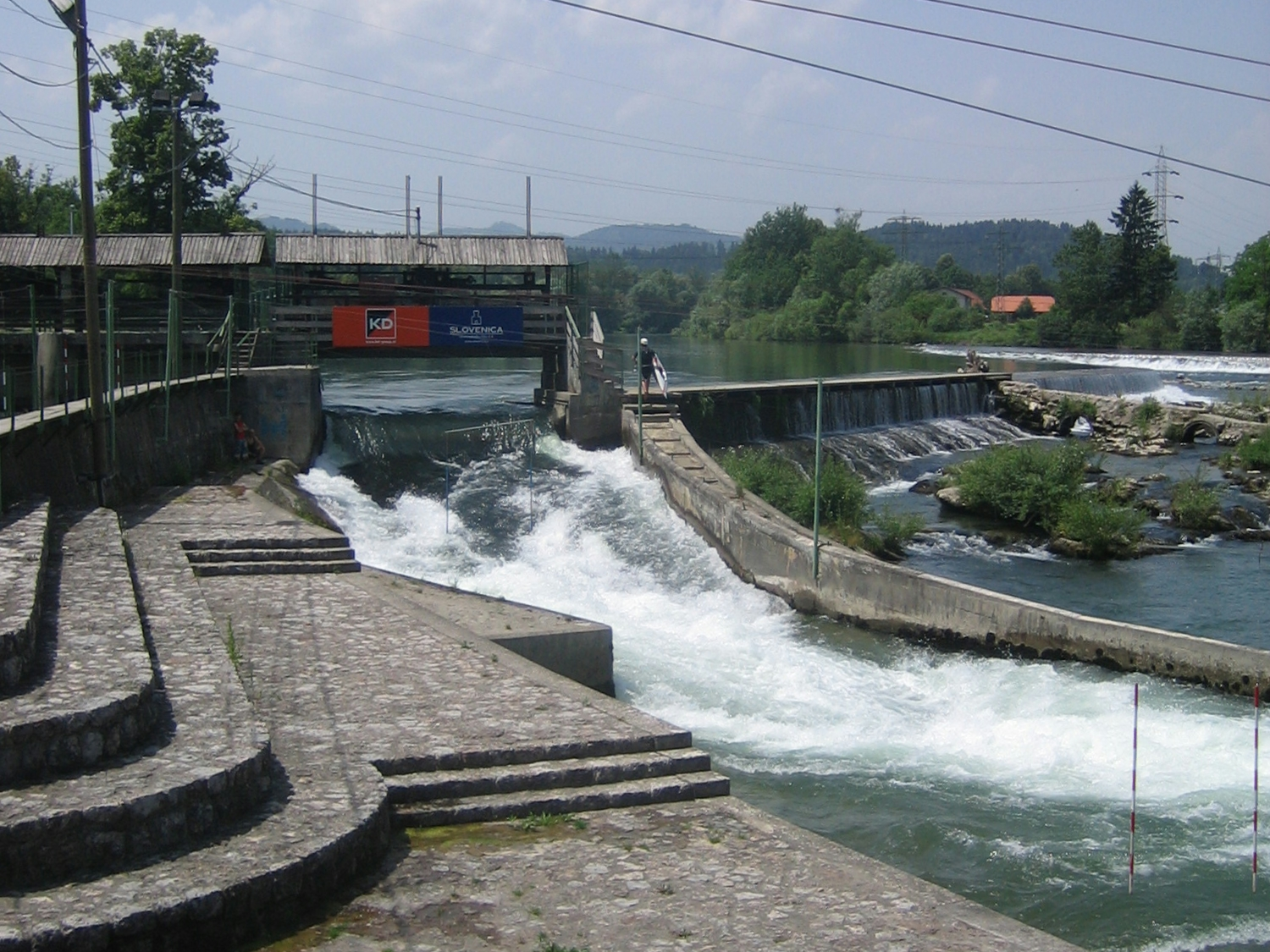
Spillway drop of the Tacen Whitewater Course

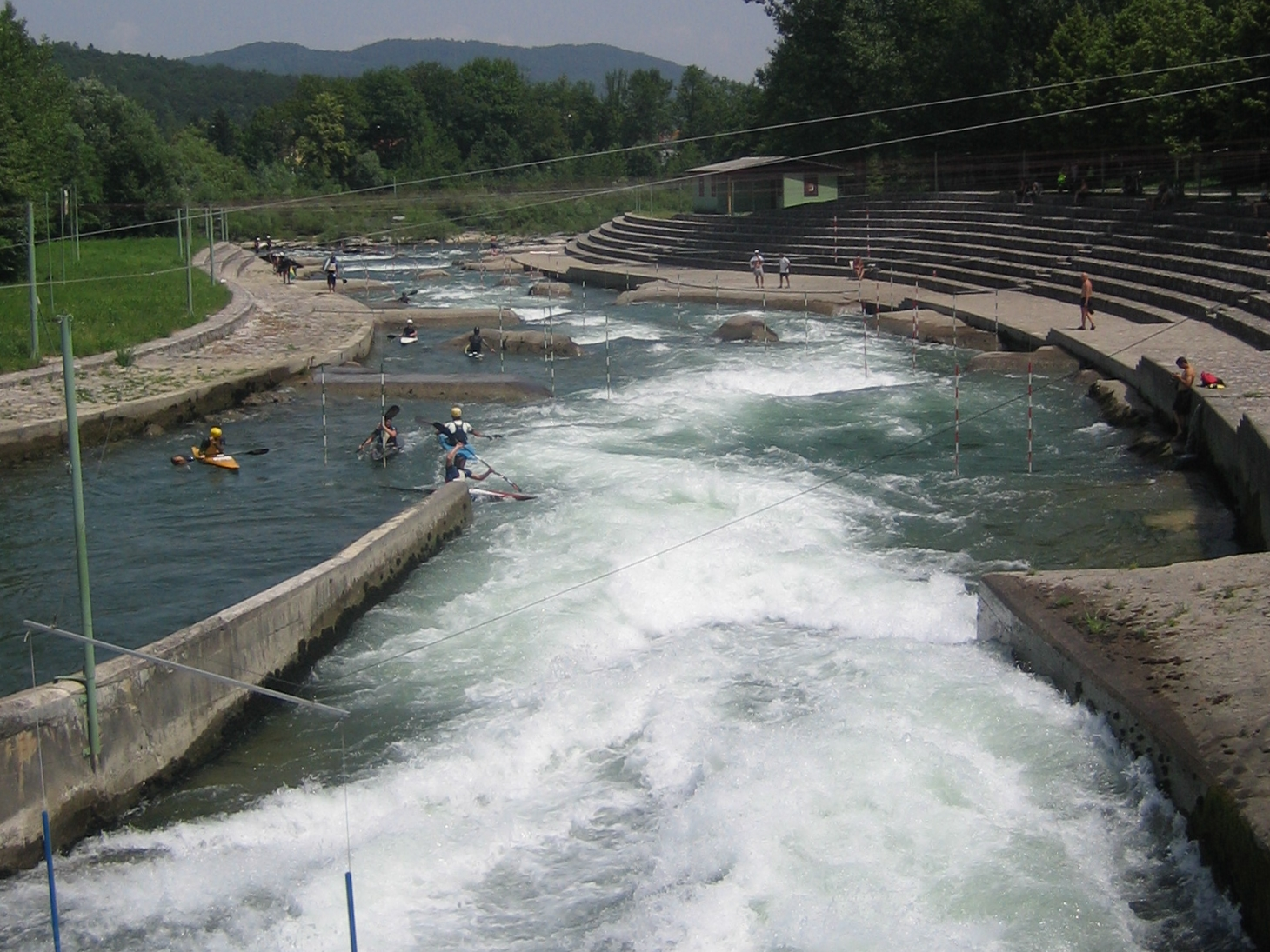
Looking down on the spillway drop from the covered bridge

== Venue ==
Map of Tacen Whitewater Course north of Ljubljana, Slovenia

The engineered part of the course is only 170 meters long. To increase its length to 275 meters, the course was extended upstream into the lake behind the dam and downstream into the natural flow of the Sava River. The upstream extension meant that each paddler had to begin the race with about an 8-second flatwater sprint and reach the top of the spillway at maximum speed. That plus the usual upstream gate at the bottom of the spillway make for a challenging start, unlike that of any other venue in the international competition circuit. The start was later moved closer to the spillway to remove the flatwater sprint.

Slalom gates for semi-finals and finals of 2014 World Cup #2, June 14–15. No single-pole gates.

Slalom gates for heats of 2014 World Cup #2, June 13. No single-pole gates.

== 2023 floods ==
The facility sustained major damage in the floods that occurred in early August 2023. Much of the infrastructure was completely destroyed or washed away.

== Videos ==
- Kauzer Tacen World Cup 1 2011 final
- K1 C1 C2 World Cup 1 2011 finals
- Molmenti 2010 World Championship
- Molmenti vs Kauzer - 2010 World Championship
- The Hochschorners vs Gargaud/Lefevre - 2010 World Championship
- Lefevre vs Aigner - 2010 World Championship heats
- 2014 C-1 World Cup
