= Augsburg Eiskanal =

Artificial whitewater river in Augsburg, Germany

- Augsburg Eiskanal Wassermachine

About
- Locale: Augsburg, Germany
- Managing agent: Augsburger Kayak Club eV Canoe Schwaben Augsburg
- Main shape: Linear
- Adjustable: Five barn-door deflectors hinged to the side walls of the channel
- Water source: Lech River
- Pumped: No
- Flow diversion: Yes (dam release)
- Practice pool: Yes
- Surf wave: Yes
- Grandstands: Landscaped into hillsides
- Canoe lift: No
- Facilities: Yes
- Construction: July 1970 - August 1971
- Opening date: August 1971

Stats
- Length: 308 m (1,010 ft)
- Width: 10 m (33 ft)
- Drop: 4.1 m (13 ft)
- Slope: Competition: 1.3% (63 ft/mi)
- Flowrate: 10 m^{3}/s (350 cu ft/s)

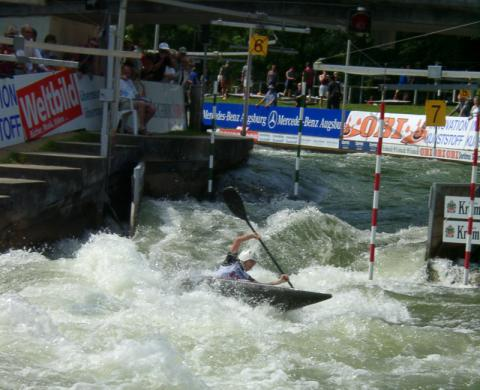
The Arch Bridge rapid at Eiskanal, its steepest drop.

The Augsburg Eiskanal is an artificial whitewater river in Augsburg, Germany, constructed as the canoe slalom venue for the 1972 Summer Olympics in nearby Munich.

The first artificial whitewater course of its kind, it introduced the sport of canoe slalom (using decked canoes and kayaks) to the Olympic Games. However, because of the expense of building artificial rivers and supplying them with water, canoe slalom was missing from the next four Summer Olympics. It returned with the 1992 Olympic Games in Barcelona, and has been featured in every Summer Olympics since then.

The Eiskanal has thus served as the prototype for six Olympic whitewater venues, from 1992 through 2012, and for more than fifty training and competition facilities in eighteen countries (see list). Despite being the oldest, it is still one of the most widely used, hosting two World Championships and numerous World Cup races. It was a World Cup venue for all but four of the years 1990 through 2010, and it was so again in 2013 and 2014.

The facility and its website are jointly managed by two clubs with headquarters in the boat house, Augsburger Kayak Club eV and Canoe Schwaben Augsburg.

== History ==
The Eiskanal complex, showing the river, dam, power house, and whitewater course.

The Hochablass (High Drain) dam on the north-flowing Lech river south of Augsburg dates back to 1647. It was most recently rebuilt in 1911-1912. The dam diverts river water into the Hauptstadtbach (Capital Creek) which branches into the many canals of the Augsburg Lech district as it flows through the town. In medieval times, the canals were used for drinking water, water wheel operation, and sewage disposal. In 1875, in order to collect drinking water from the upstream end of the system, a water collection and filtration plant was built straddling a new bypass branch of Capital Creek, near the dam. (In 2007 it was decommissioned and converted into a waterworks museum and a small hydro power station.) The original channel became known as the Eiskanal (ice channel), since it was used to deflect floating ice away from the waterworks facility, protecting its equipment.

By the 1950s, the Eiskanal was already in use as a canoe slalom venue, but its slope was much less than that of the mountain streams commonly used in the sport. When the 1972 Olympic Games were awarded to Munich, a plan was devised to create a much steeper artificial whitewater rapid by constructing a 300-meter-long channel connecting the Eiskanal section of Capital Creek directly back to the Lech river. The 1971 construction cost was 14.9 million Deutsche Marks, equivalent to $24.5 million US (2013). For the 1972 Olympics, this new channel was only the bottom half of a 660-meter race course; the top half was in the old Eiskanal, starting above the boat house near the dam. Since the standard length of a canoe slalom course was later reduced to 250 to 300 meters, major races are now held entirely within the 1971 channel. Nonetheless, the entire sports complex goes by the name Eiskanal.

To prepare for the 1972 Olympics, East Germany's team constructed a secret copy of the Eiskanal on the Zwickau Mulde river in the Cainsdorf district of Zwickau. The training there, on the world's only other artificial rapid, was so successful that East German paddlers won all four Olympic gold medals in canoe slalom, the only time that has ever happened. The ruins of the long-abandoned, overgrown canal can still be seen in satellite photographs at 50.680°N 12.5027°E.

== Design ==
Using a technique which has never been duplicated, the streambed of the Eiskanal canoe slalom channel was made of sculpted concrete, with simulated boulders being an integral part of the uneven channel floor. This feature is easily seen in photographs of the channel without water. The shapes were planned using water flowing through a 25-meter-long scale model made of sheet metal. Most of the simulated boulders are attached to the channel walls, but two stand alone in the middle of the channel. Five barn-door water deflectors, hinged to the channel sides, can be swung in or out to change the water flow at those locations.

An underwater weir at the top can be raised to block most or all of the flow into the slalom channel from Capital Creek. At the bottom, a stationary weir creates a take-out pool. A pedestrian bridge on top of the weir supports a strainer that keeps people and boats from washing over. The strainer is slanted toward the river so anything that washes against it is pushed up rather than down.

Six names have been given to sections of the channel. The turbulent water between the first drop and the first rock island is called Waschmaschine, or Washing Machine. Where the channel narrows and drops at the pedestrian bridge is Bogenbrücke, or Arch Bridge. It has a pair of hinged water deflectors to further narrow the channel, if desired. The rock island below the bridge is called Moby Dick, after the fictional whale. At the last of the hinged deflectors, on the left wall, the right half of the channel is a pour-over. The wave at the pour-over is called Korkenzieher, or Corkscrew. The turbulent right bend in the channel between there and the road bridge is Karussell, or Carousel. Another pour-over wave under the bridge, on the left side, is called Torpedowalze, or Torpedo Hole. After the road bridge, the course flattens out, and racers sprint to the finish line.

Water diversion features of the Augsburg Eiskanal canoe slalom race course.

Finals gate set for World Cup race #2, 29 Jun 2013.

== Gallery ==
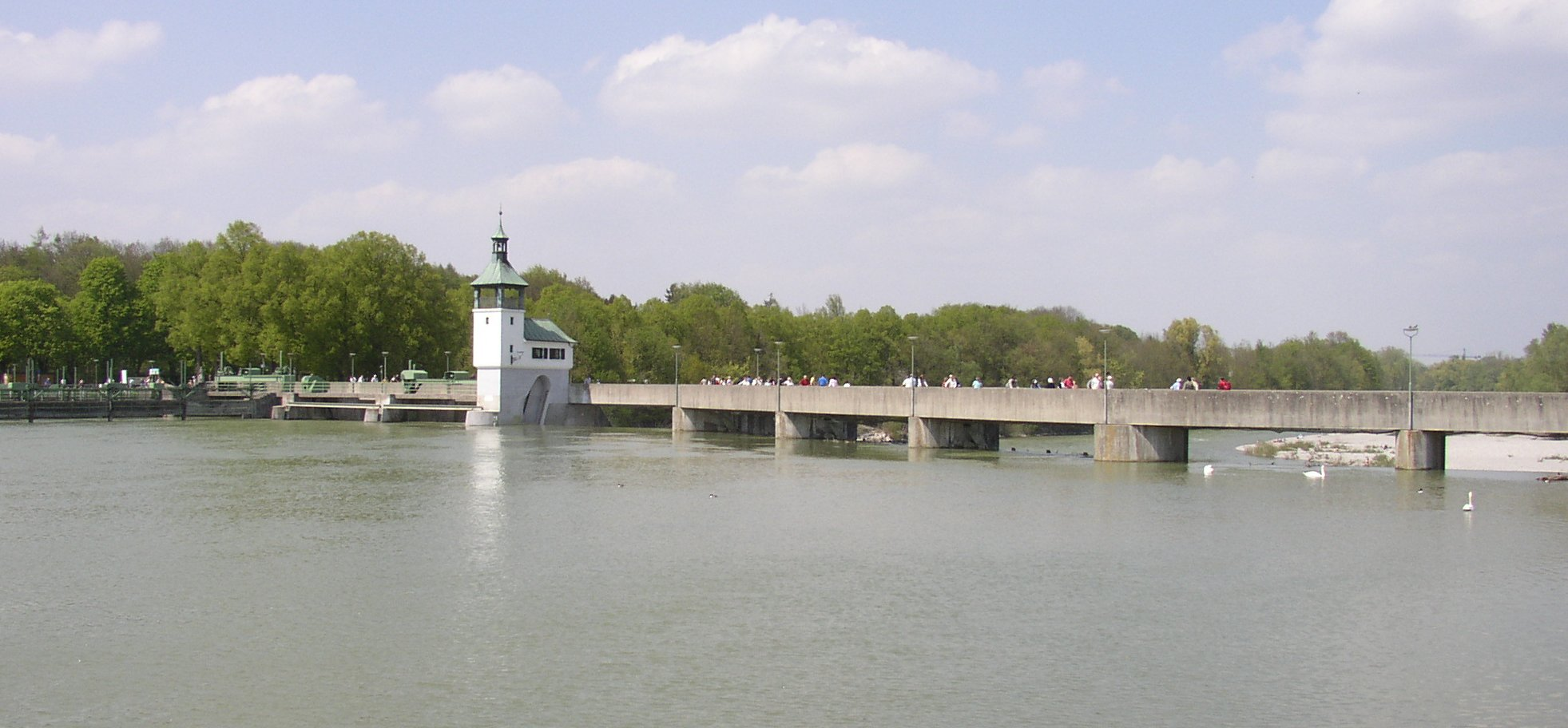
The lake behind Hochablass dam on the Lech river.

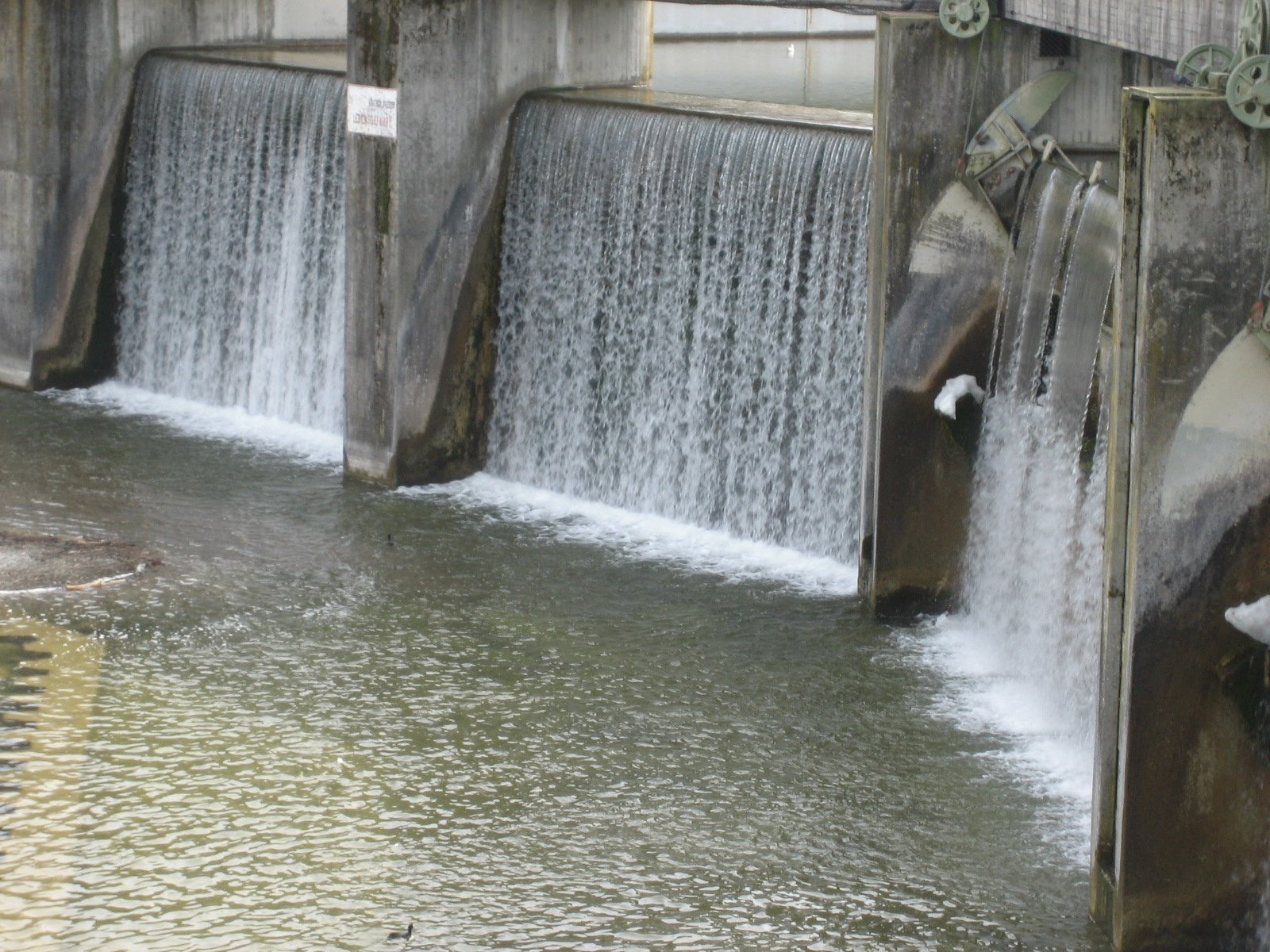
Downstream side of Hochablass, showing the 5.8 meter drop that powers the Eiskanal.

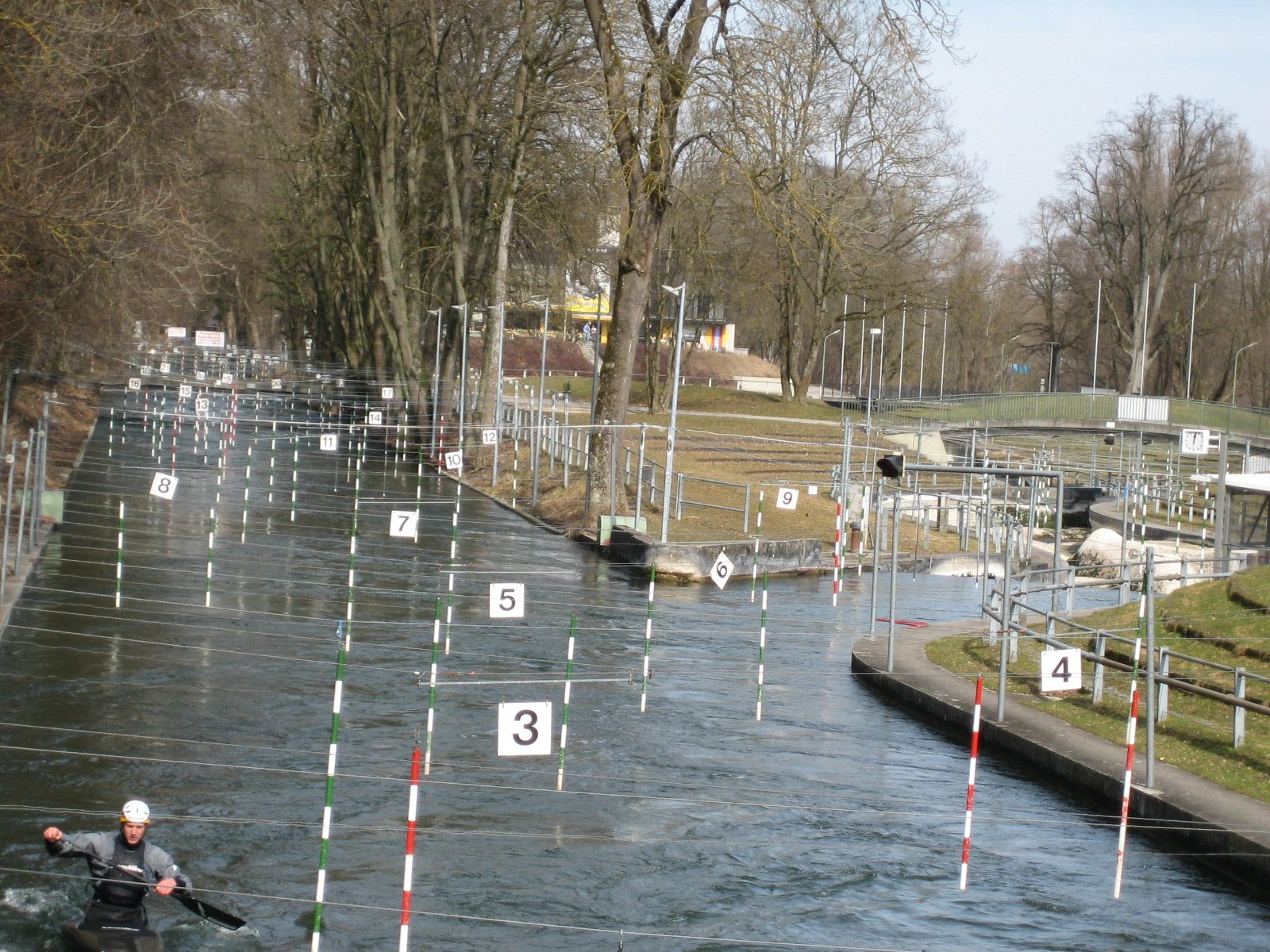
Flatwater gates on Capital Creek; whitewater course branches off to the right.

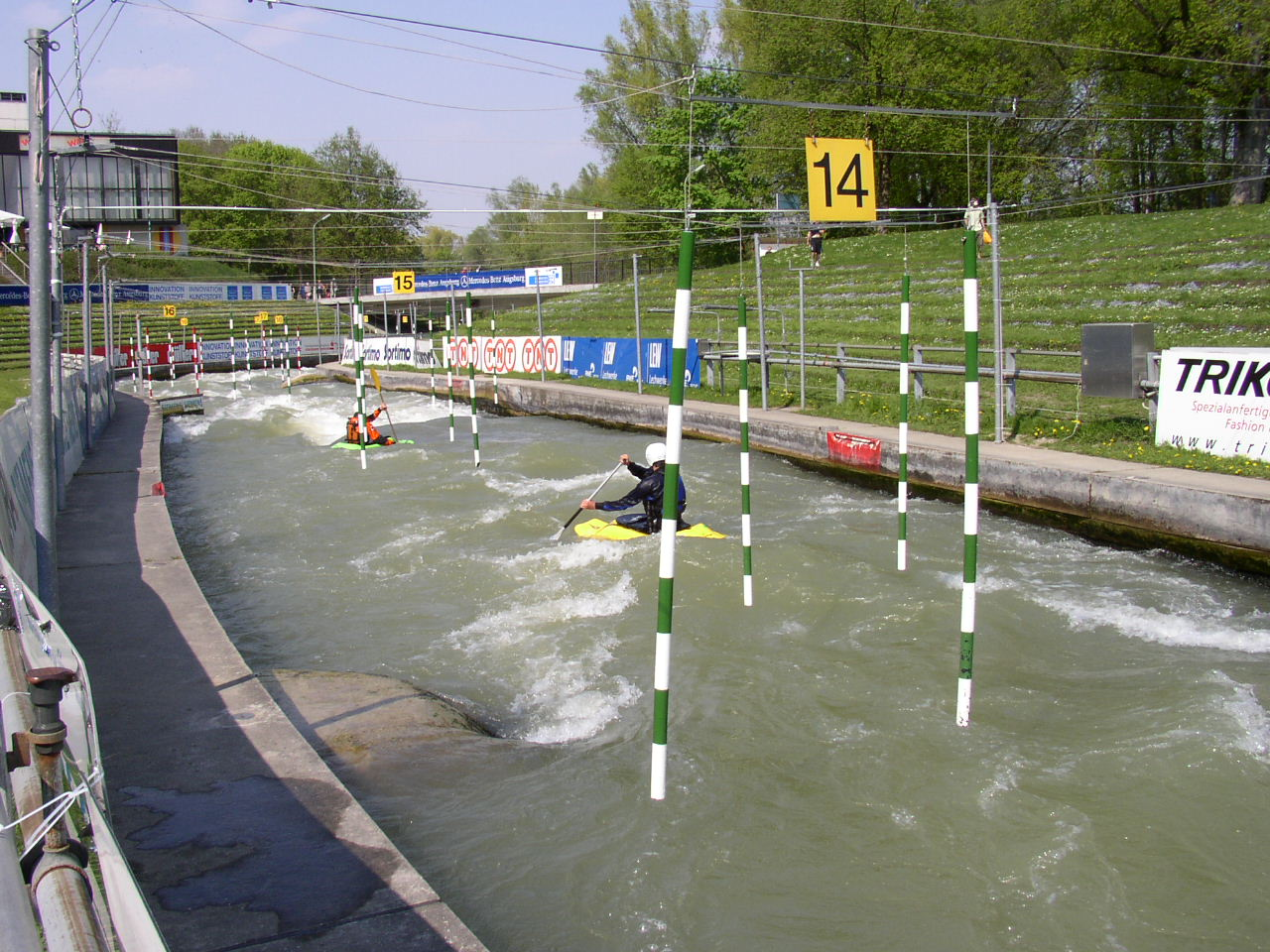
The course fully watered. Corkscrew wave in the mid distance (past gate 15).

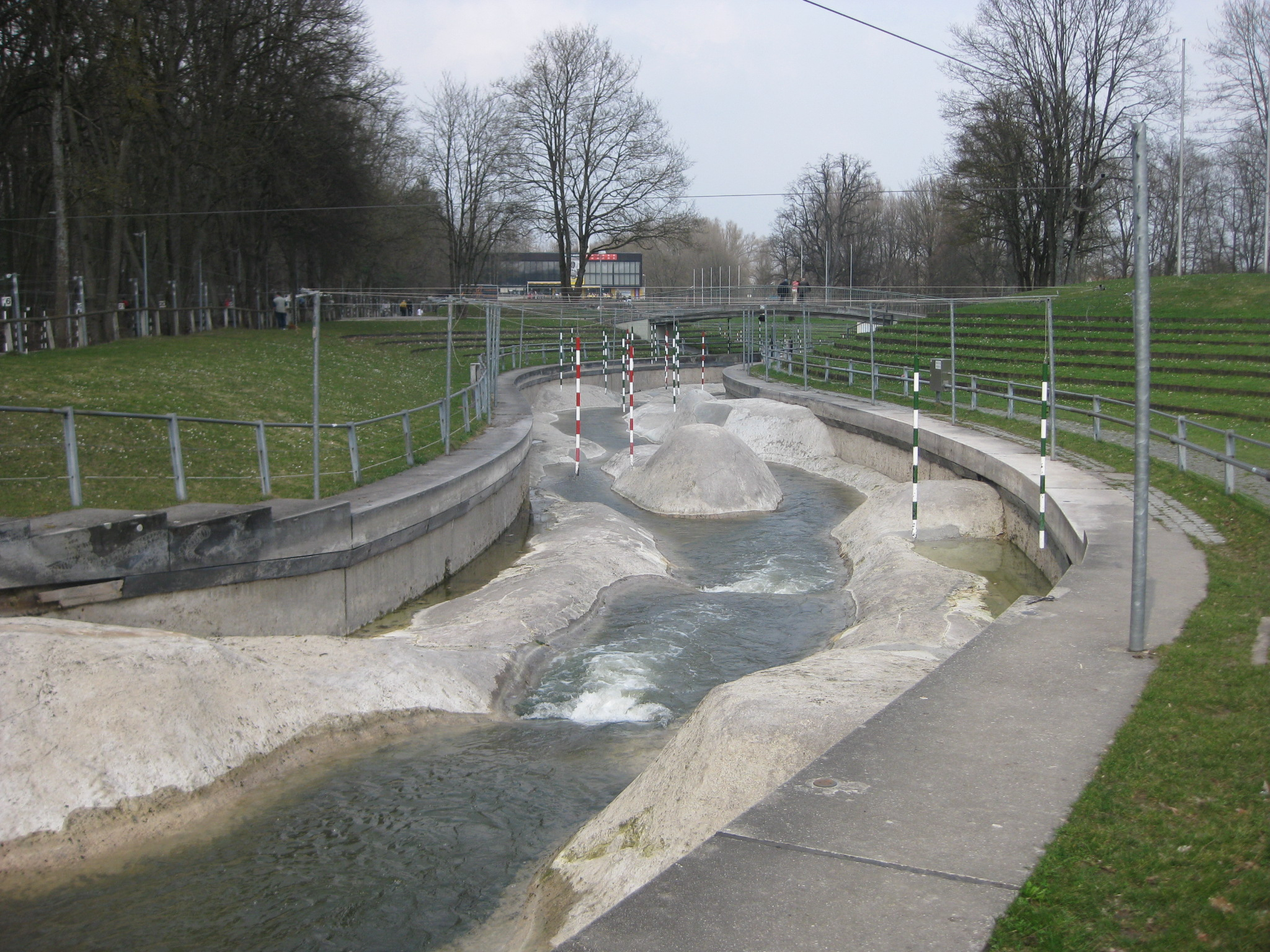
Without water, Washing Machine section, from first drop to the rock island.

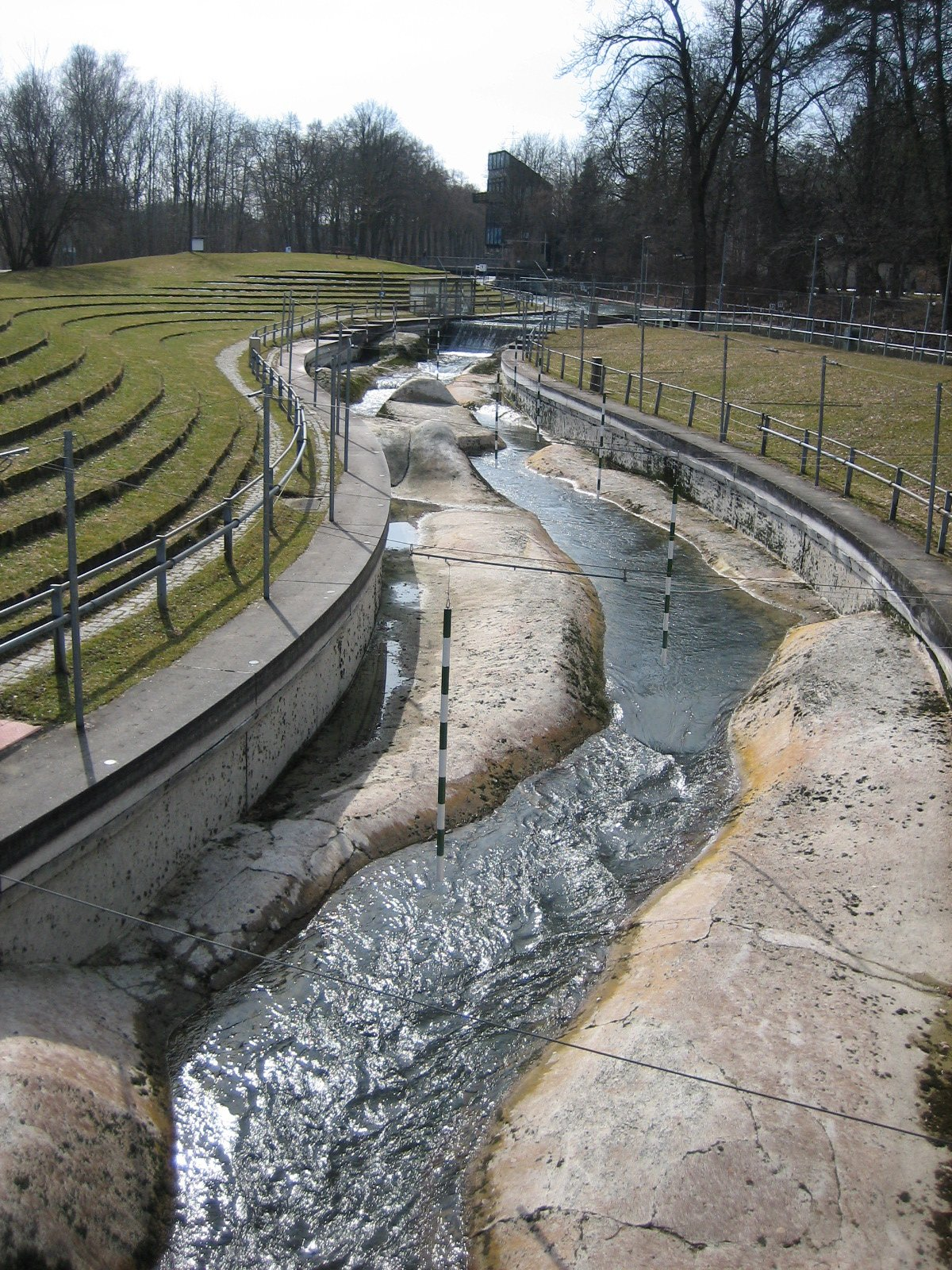
Looking upstream from the Arch Bridge.

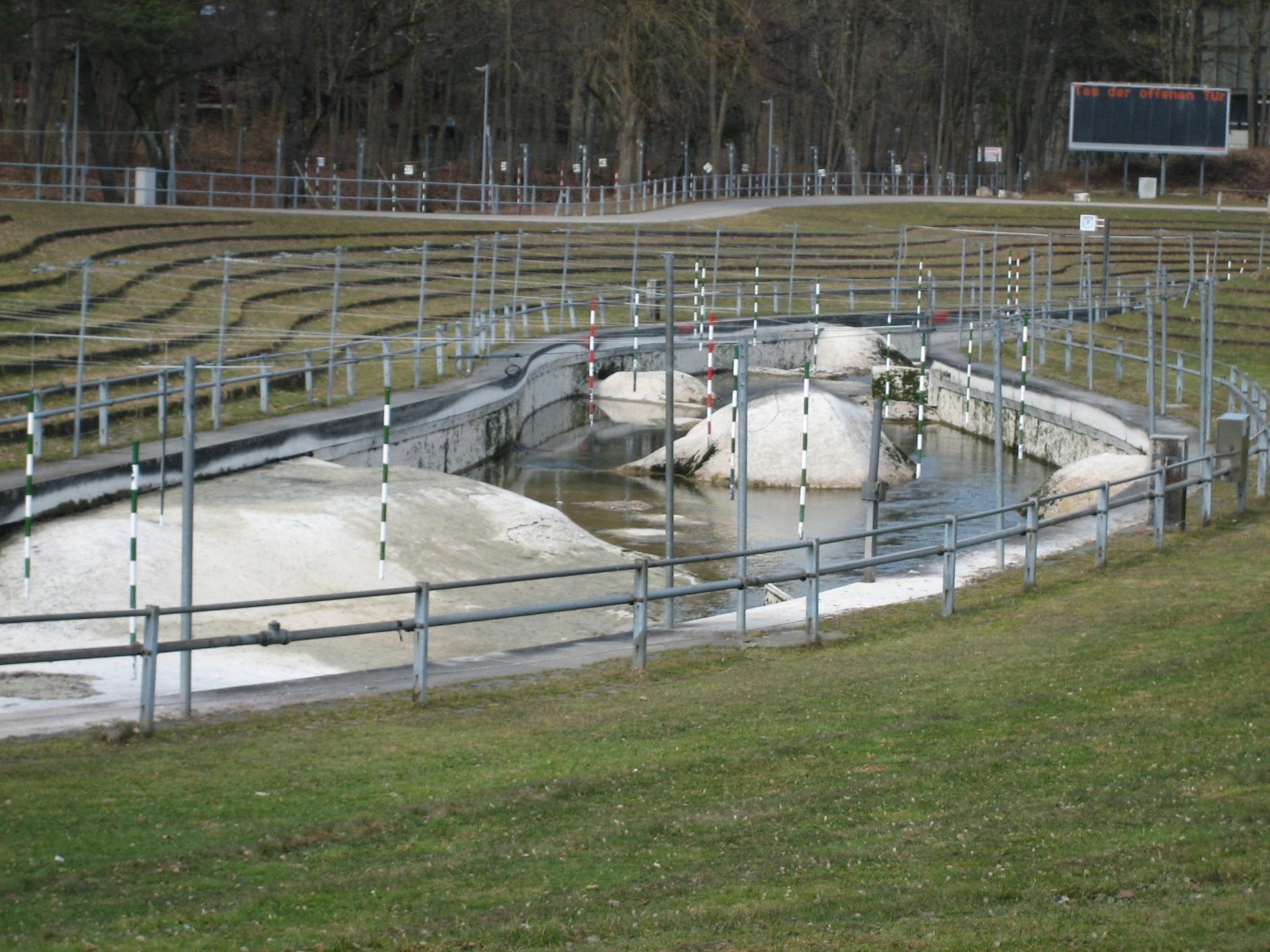
Looking downstream from Arch Bridge toward Moby Dick.

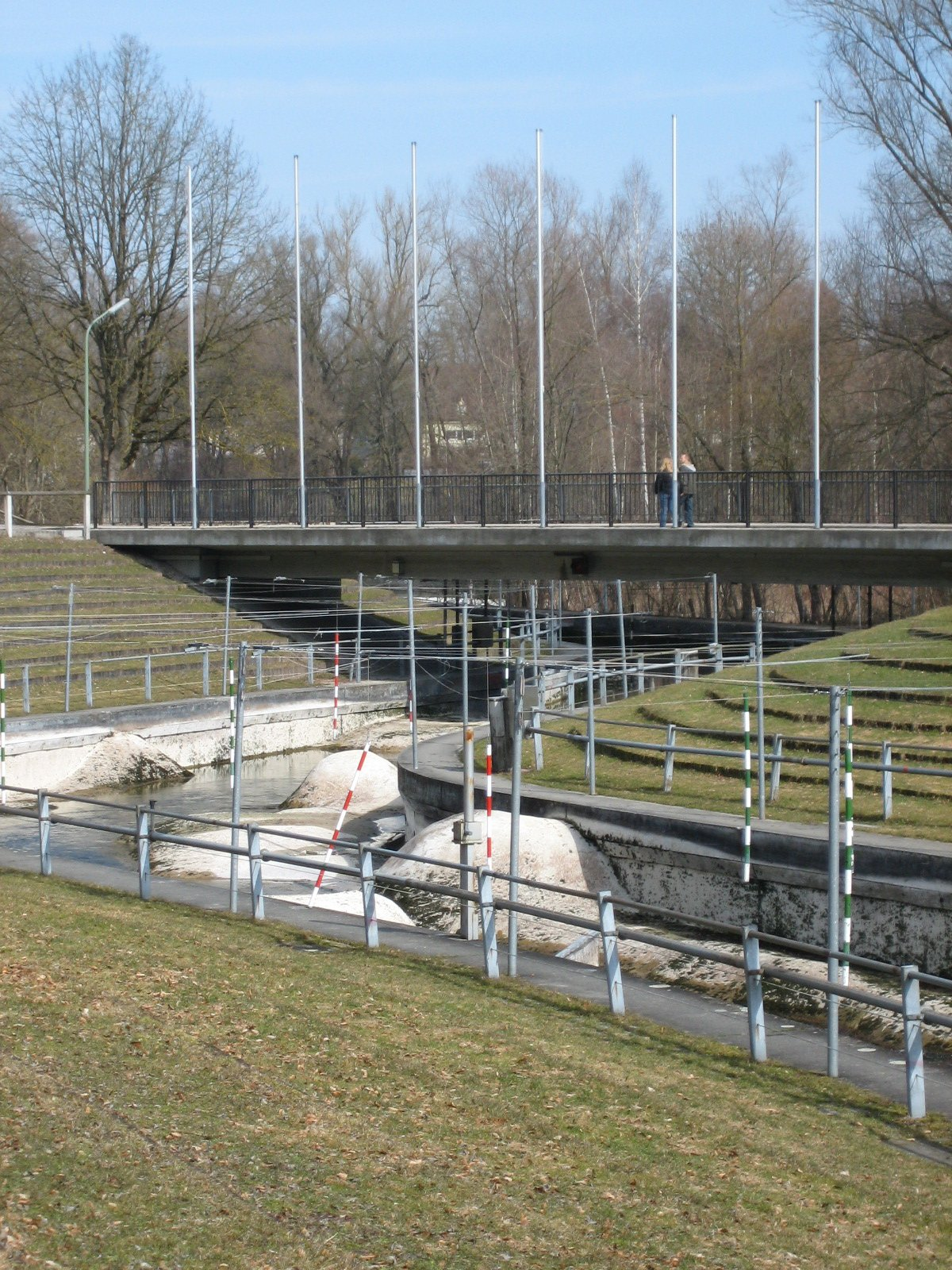
The Carousel section approaching the road bridge.

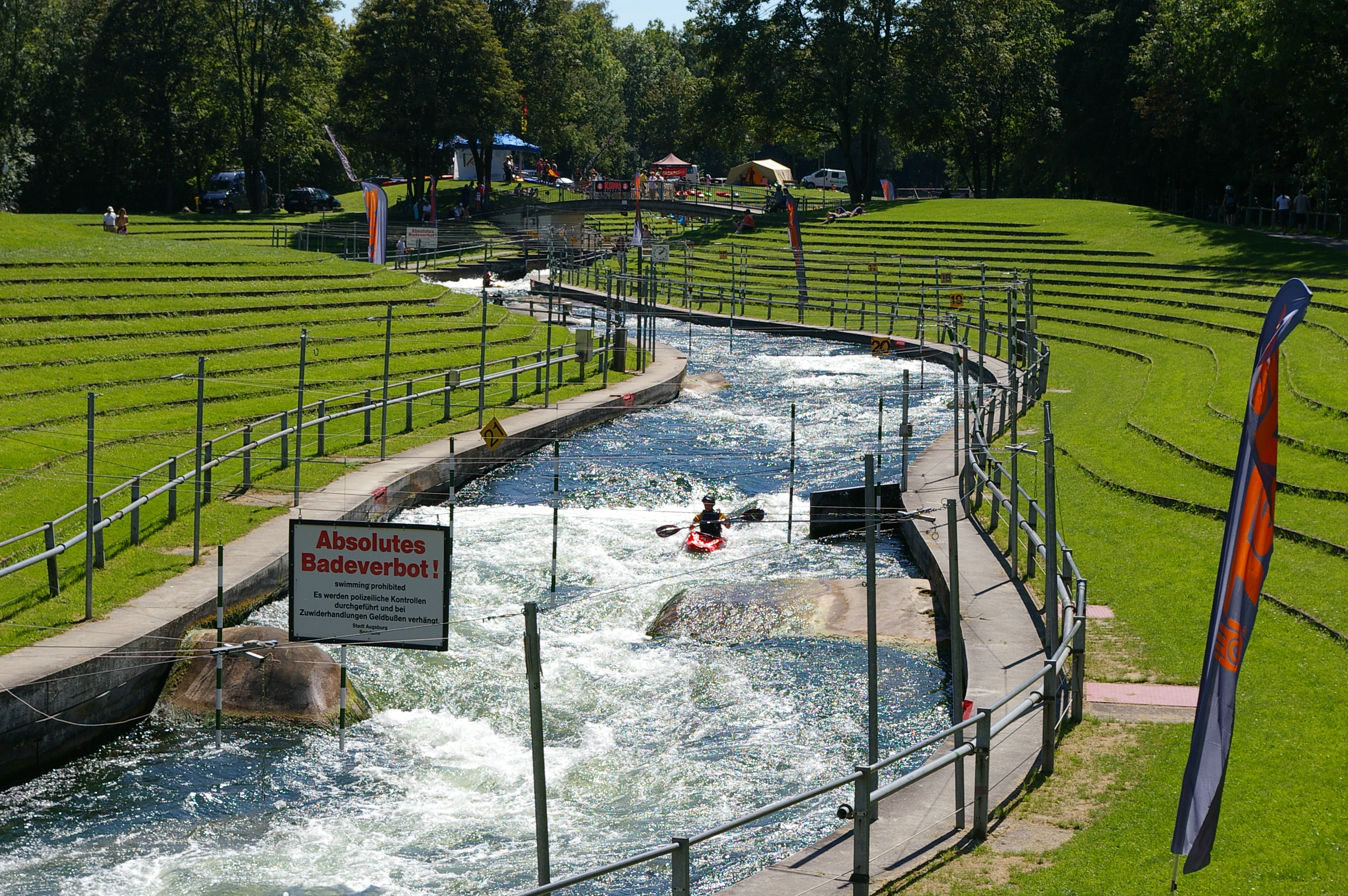
Kayaker at Corkscrew entering Carousel, Arch Bridge in background.

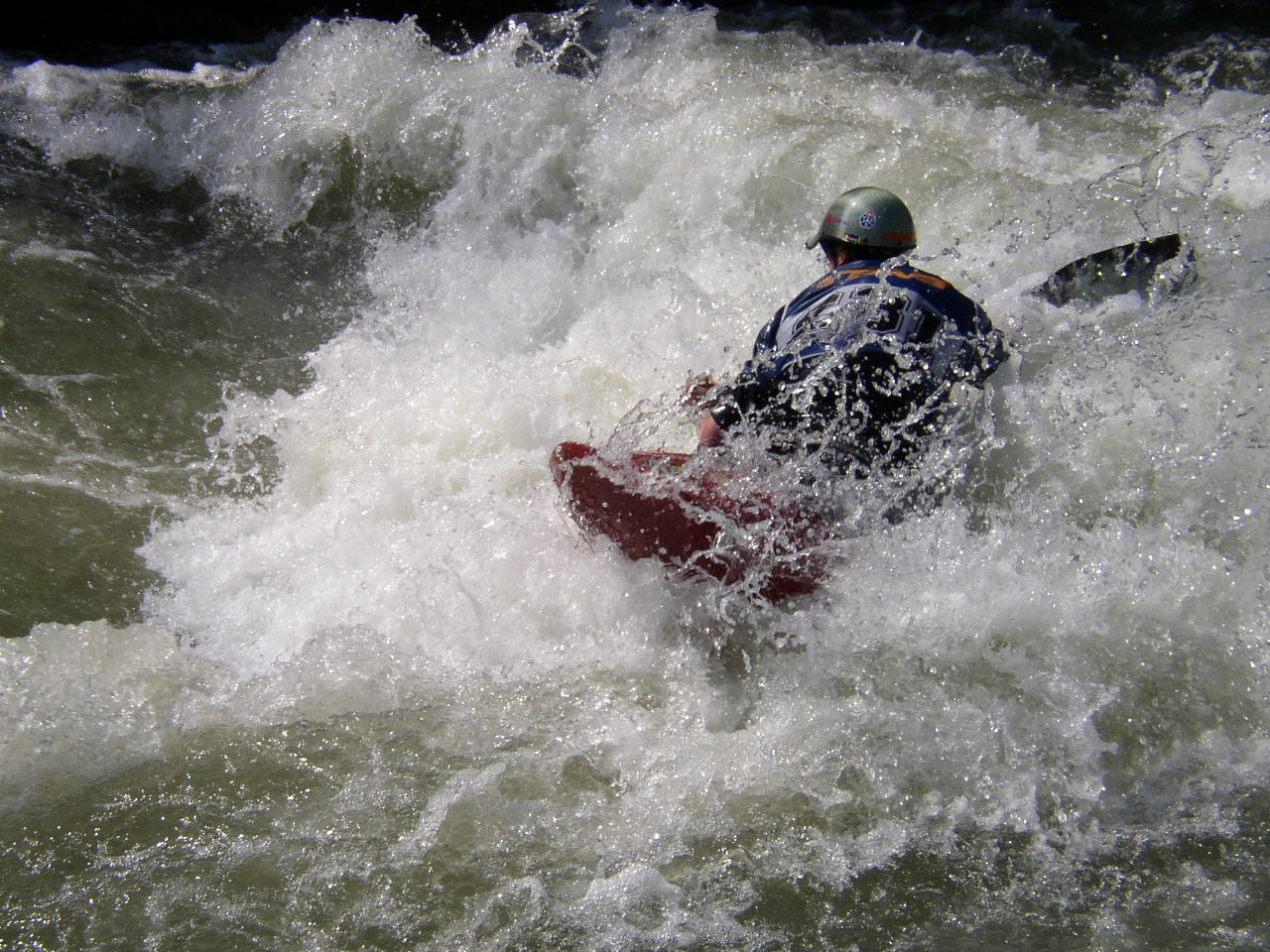
Three pictures at the top drop, where Washing Machine begins.

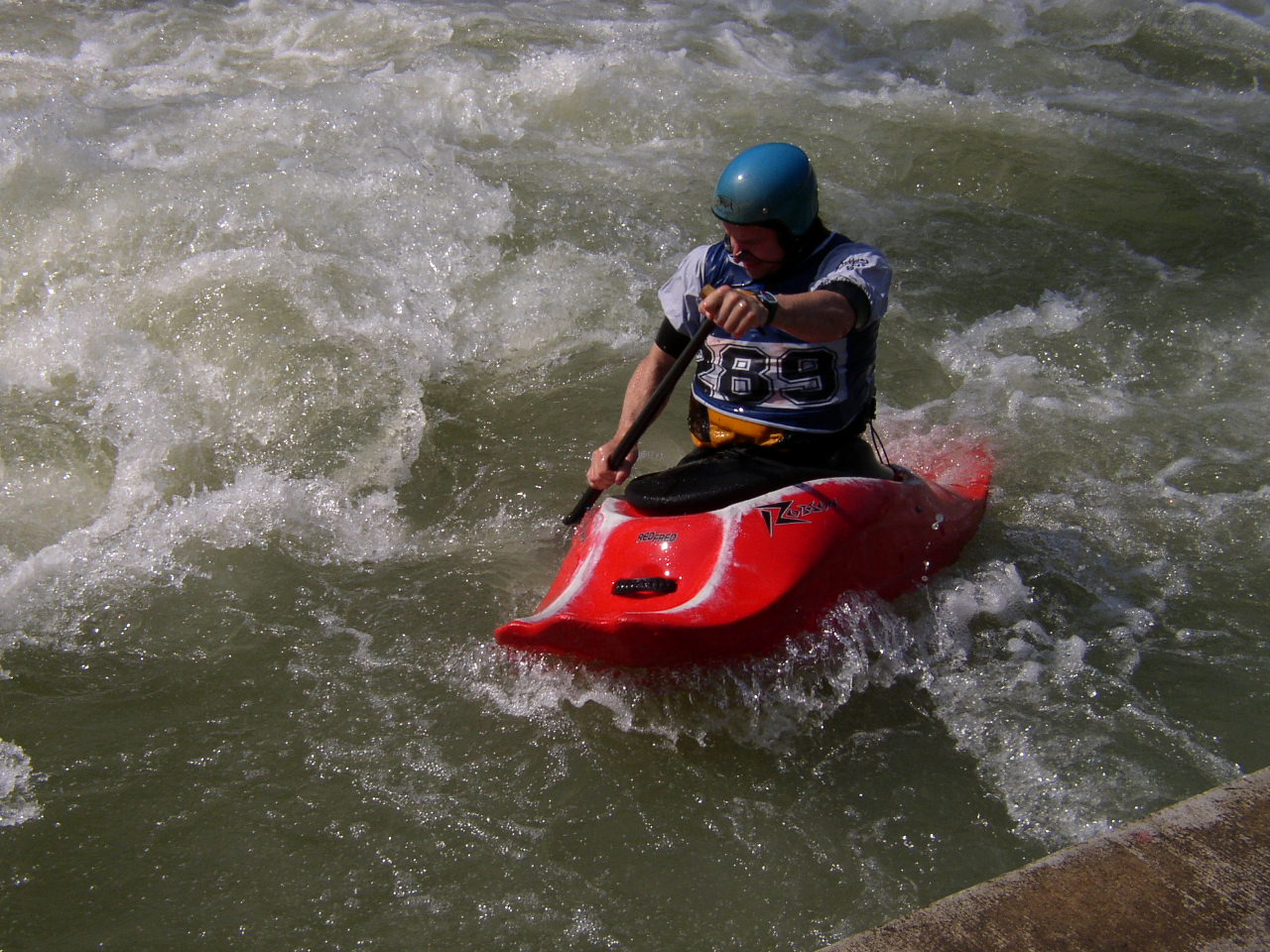
Playboating in the 2006 Eurocup competition, kneeling C-1.

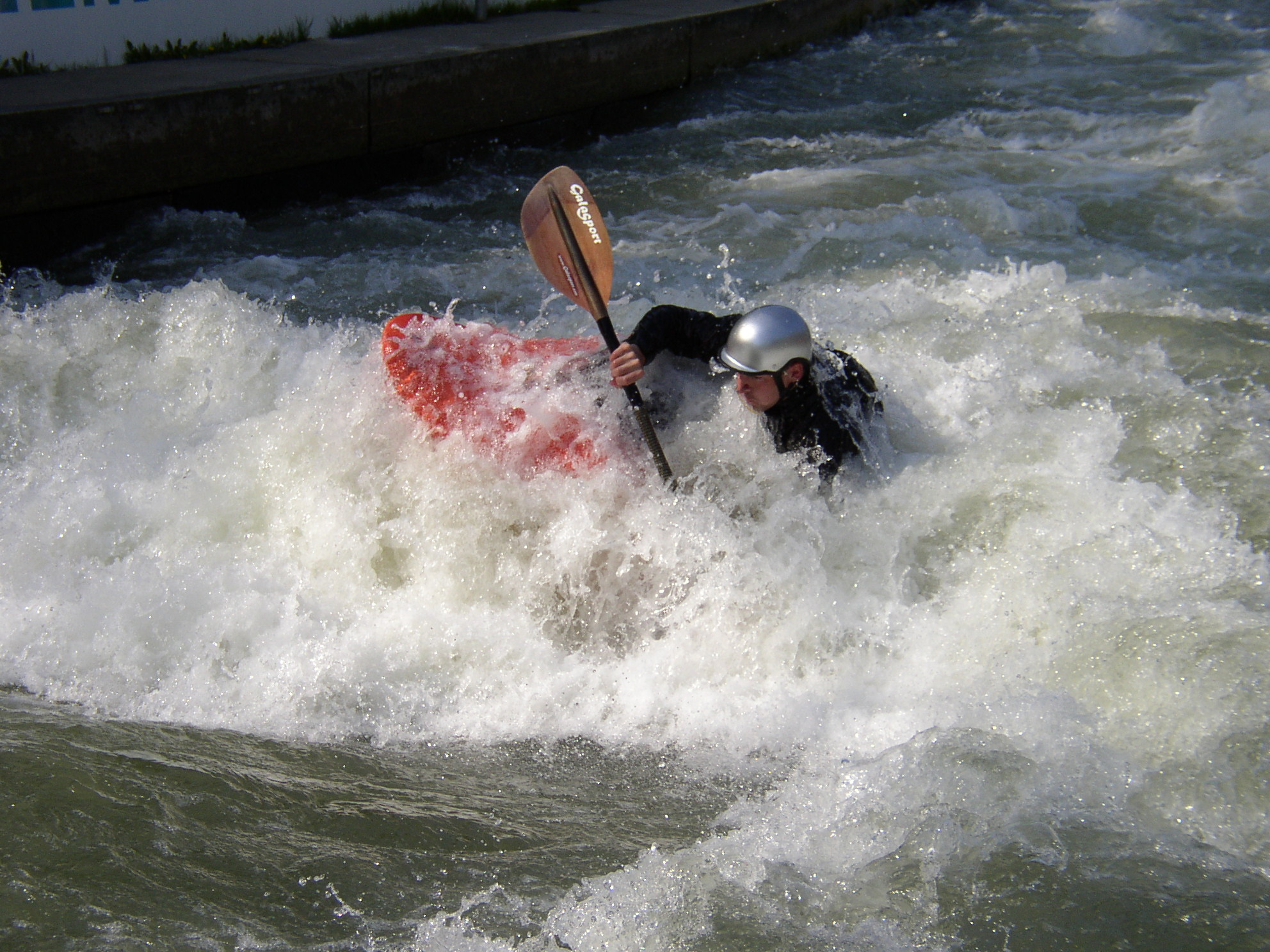
Seated in a kayak, K-1.

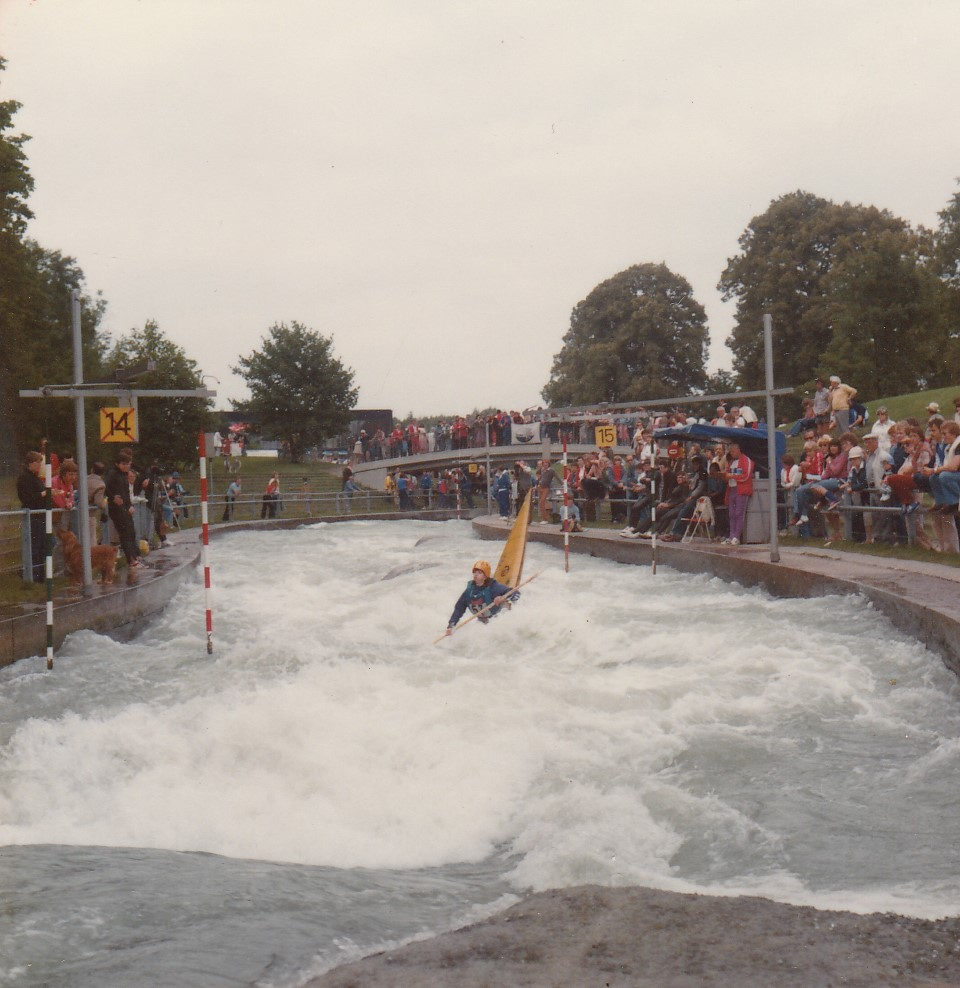
The Washing Machine in 1978
