= 2003 Canoe Slalom World Cup =

The 2003 Canoe Slalom World Cup was a series of five races in 4 canoeing and kayaking categories organized by the International Canoe Federation (ICF). It was the 16th edition. The series consisted of 4 regular world cup races and the world cup final.

== Calendar ==
Label	Venue	Date
World Cup Race 1	(Australia) Penrith	10–11 May
World Cup Race 2	(Spain) La Seu d'Urgell	5–6 July
World Cup Race 3	(Slovenia) Tacen	12–13 July
World Cup Race 4	(Slovakia) Bratislava	30–31 July
World Cup Final	(Slovakia) Bratislava	2–3 August

== Final standings ==
The winner of each world cup race was awarded 30 points. Semifinalists were guaranteed at least 5 points and paddlers eliminated in heats received 2 points each. The world cup final points scale was multiplied by a factor of 1.5. That meant the winner of the world cup final earned 45 points, semifinalists got at least 7.5 points and paddlers eliminated in heats received 3 points apiece. Only the best four results of each athlete counted for the final world cup standings.

=== C1 men ===
Pos	Athlete	Points
1	Tony Estanguet (FRA)	92
2	Michal Martikán (SVK)	89.5
3	Robin Bell (AUS)	83.5
4	Stefan Pfannmöller (GER)	80
5	Juraj Minčík (SVK)	72
6	Tomáš Indruch (CZE)	71
7	Stuart McIntosh (GBR)	68.5
8	Justin Boocock (AUS)	57.5
9	Jan Mašek (CZE)	55.5
10	Stanislav Ježek (CZE)	51

=== C2 men ===
Pos	Athletes	Points
1	Pavol Hochschorner/Peter Hochschorner (SVK)	130
2	Jaroslav Pospíšil/Jaroslav Pollert (CZE)	86
3	Marek Jiras/Tomáš Máder (CZE)	84
4	Philippe Quémerais/Yann Le Pennec (FRA)	58
5	Marcus Becker/Stefan Henze (GER)	53.5
6	Ľuboš Šoška/Peter Šoška (SVK)	51
7	Stuart Bowman/Nick Smith (GBR)	50
8	Jaroslav Volf/Ondřej Štěpánek (CZE)	48.5
9	Scott McCleskey/David Hepp (USA)	46
10	Mark Bellofiore/Lachie Milne (AUS)	45.5

=== K1 men ===
Pos	Athlete	Points
1	David Ford (CAN)	91
2	Julien Billaut (FRA)	83
3	Helmut Oblinger (AUT)	77.5
4	Andrej Nolimal (SLO)	69.5
5	Fabien Lefèvre (FRA)	67.5
6	Michael Kurt (SUI)	63
7	Peter Cibák (SVK)	61.5
8	Paul Ratcliffe (GBR)	57.5
9	Thomas Schmidt (GER)	57
10	Pierpaolo Ferrazzi (ITA)	44.5

=== K1 women ===
Pos	Athlete	Points
1	Elena Kaliská (SVK)	99.5
2	Štěpánka Hilgertová (CZE)	95
2	Gabriela Stacherová (SVK)	95
4	Rebecca Giddens (USA)	87.5
5	Violetta Oblinger-Peters (AUT)	80
6	Irena Pavelková (CZE)	65
7	Gabriela Zamišková (SVK)	53.5
8	Vanda Semerádová (CZE)	52.5
9	Cristina Giai Pron (ITA)	49
10	Margaret Langford (CAN)	46

== Results ==
=== World Cup Race 1 ===
The first world cup race of the season took place at the Penrith Whitewater Stadium, Australia from 10 to 11 May.

Event	Gold	Score	Silver	Score	Bronze	Score
C1 men	Justin Boocock (AUS)	180.71	Robin Bell (AUS)	181.54	Michal Martikán (SVK)	184.39
C2 men	Slovakia; Milan Kubáň; Marián Olejník	193.00	United Kingdom; Stuart Bowman; Nick Smith	196.29	Slovakia; Ladislav Škantár; Peter Škantár	206.71
K1 men	David Ford (CAN)	169.34	Campbell Walsh (GBR)	170.04	Peter Cibák (SVK)	170.37
K1 women	Rebecca Giddens (USA)	196.19	Mia Farrance (AUS)	201.88	Gabriela Stacherová (SVK)	202.53

=== World Cup Race 2 ===
The second world cup race of the season took place at the Segre Olympic Park in La Seu d'Urgell, Spain from 5 to 6 July.

Event	Gold	Score	Silver	Score	Bronze	Score
C1 men	Michal Martikán (SVK)	202.30	Stefan Pfannmöller (GER)	204.27	Jan Benzien (GER)	205.16
C2 men	Slovakia; Pavol Hochschorner; Peter Hochschorner	212.97	Czech Republic; Marek Jiras; Tomáš Máder	215.37	United Kingdom; Stuart Bowman; Nick Smith	217.47
K1 men	Fabien Lefèvre (FRA)	192.39	Paul Ratcliffe (GBR)	193.31	Julien Billaut (FRA)	196.46
K1 women	Štěpánka Hilgertová (CZE)	218.13	Rebecca Giddens (USA)	221.16	Margaret Langford (CAN)	224.00

=== World Cup Race 3 ===
The third world cup race of the season took place at the Tacen Whitewater Course, Slovenia from 12 to 13 July.

Event	Gold	Score	Silver	Score	Bronze	Score
C1 men	Tomáš Indruch (CZE)	205.15	Simon Hočevar (SLO)	206.84	Robin Bell (AUS)	207.15
C2 men	Czech Republic; Marek Jiras; Tomáš Máder	214.01	Slovakia; Pavol Hochschorner; Peter Hochschorner	218.93	Czech Republic; Jaroslav Pospíšil; Jaroslav Pollert	223.72
K1 men	Andrej Nolimal (SLO)	193.90	Loris Minvielle (FRA)	198.84	Michael Kurt (SUI)	199.93
K1 women	Gabriela Zamišková (SVK)	225.48	Marie Řihošková (CZE)	227.33	Elena Kaliská (SVK)	228.88

=== World Cup Race 4 ===
The fourth world cup race of the season took place at the Čunovo Water Sports Centre, Slovakia from 30 to 31 July.

Event	Gold	Score	Silver	Score	Bronze	Score
C1 men	Tony Estanguet (FRA)	208.81	Stefan Pfannmöller (GER)	209.83	Juraj Minčík (SVK)	210.00
C2 men	Slovakia; Pavol Hochschorner; Peter Hochschorner	218.86	Czech Republic; Jaroslav Volf; Ondřej Štěpánek	219.34	Czech Republic; Jaroslav Pospíšil; Jaroslav Pollert	240.03
K1 men	Fabien Lefèvre (FRA)	190.82	Thomas Schmidt (GER)	195.88	Paul Ratcliffe (GBR)	197.20
K1 women	Gabriela Stacherová (SVK)	227.11	Elena Kaliská (SVK)	231.89	Štěpánka Hilgertová (CZE)	234.72

=== World Cup Final ===
The Čunovo Water Sports Centre in Bratislava also hosted the final race of the season from 2 to 3 August.

Event	Gold	Score	Silver	Score	Bronze	Score
C1 men	Tony Estanguet (FRA)	214.41	Michal Martikán (SVK)	220.50	Stefan Pfannmöller (GER)	224.70
C2 men	Slovakia; Pavol Hochschorner; Peter Hochschorner	226.55	Germany; Marcus Becker; Stefan Henze	235.53	Czech Republic; Jaroslav Pospíšil; Jaroslav Pollert	236.50
K1 men	Julien Billaut (FRA)	209.72	Andrej Nolimal (SLO)	211.22	David Ford (CAN)	211.74
K1 women	Štěpánka Hilgertová (CZE)	234.57	Elena Kaliská (SVK)	237.48	Violetta Oblinger-Peters (AUT)	237.86
