= 2007 Canoe Slalom World Cup =

The 2007 Canoe Slalom World Cup was a series of four races in 4 canoeing and kayaking categories organized by the International Canoe Federation (ICF). It was the 20th edition. The series consisted of Pan American continental championships which were open to all countries and 3 world cup races.

== Calendar ==
Label	Venue	Date
2007 Pan American Championships	(Brazil) Foz do Iguaçu	16–18 March
World Cup Race 1	(Czech Republic) Prague	29 June - 1 July
World Cup Race 2	(Slovenia) Tacen	7–8 July
World Cup Race 3	(Germany) Augsburg	13–15 July

== Final standings ==
The winner of each race was awarded 50 points. Paddlers outside the top 20 in the C2 event and outside the top 40 in the other 3 events were awarded 2 points for participation. If two or more athletes or boats were equal on points, the ranking was determined by their positions in the final world cup race.

=== C1 men ===
Pos	Athlete	Points
1	Nico Bettge (GER)	168
2	David Florence (GBR)	162
3	Robin Bell (AUS)	153
4	Stuart McIntosh (GBR)	136
5	Dejan Stevanovič (SLO)	127
6	Michal Martikán (SVK)	125
7	Stefan Pfannmöller (GER)	120
8	Tomáš Indruch (CZE)	116
9	Stanislav Ježek (CZE)	111
10	Ronnie Dürrenmatt (SUI)	108

=== C2 men ===
Pos	Athletes	Points
1	Pavol Hochschorner/Peter Hochschorner (SVK)	195
2	Jaroslav Volf/Ondřej Štěpánek (CZE)	165
3	Marek Jiras/Tomáš Máder (CZE)	162
4	Tim Baillie/Etienne Stott (GBR)	147
5	Aljaž Kulovec/Simon Hočevar (SLO)	123
6	Mark Bellofiore/Lachie Milne (AUS)	117
7	Felix Michel/Sebastian Piersig (GER)	105
8	Marcus Becker/Stefan Henze (GER)	97
9	Daniel Goddard/Nick Smith (GBR)	97
10	Marcin Pochwała/Paweł Sarna (POL)	95

=== K1 men ===
Pos	Athlete	Points
1	Fabian Dörfler (GER)	164
2	Michael Kurt (SUI)	150
3	Alexander Grimm (GER)	149
4	Campbell Walsh (GBR)	128
5	Erik Pfannmöller (GER)	123
6	Ivan Pišvejc (CZE)	115
7	Peter Kauzer (SLO)	114
8	Scott Parsons (USA)	107
9	Helmut Oblinger (AUT)	102
10	Dejan Kralj (SLO)	98

=== K1 women ===
Pos	Athlete	Points
1	Jasmin Schornberg (GER)	159
2	Irena Pavelková (CZE)	146
3	Violetta Oblinger-Peters (AUT)	145
4	Fiona Pennie (GBR)	142
5	Laura Blakeman (GBR)	134
6	Štěpánka Hilgertová (CZE)	130
7	Jana Dukátová (SVK)	125
8	Jennifer Bongardt (GER)	118
9	Elena Kaliská (SVK)	106
10	Ariane Herde (NED)	101

== Results ==
=== 2007 Pan American Championships ===
The 2007 Pan American Championships were held in Foz do Iguaçu, Brazil on March 16–18. Czech Republic was the most successful country taking home 2 golds and 1 bronze.

Event	Gold	Score	Silver	Score	Bronze	Score
C1 men	Tony Estanguet (FRA)	192.57	Nico Bettge (GER)	196.22	David Florence (GBR)	196.67
C2 men	Czech Republic; Jaroslav Volf; Ondřej Štěpánek	203.22	Slovakia; Pavol Hochschorner; Peter Hochschorner	205.64	France; Cédric Forgit; Martin Braud	211.51
K1 men	Fabian Dörfler (GER)	183.73	Michael Kurt (SUI)	186.53	Alexander Grimm (GER)	186.90
K1 women	Marie Řihošková (CZE)	208.17	Jennifer Bongardt (GER)	209.61	Irena Pavelková (CZE)	210.07

=== World Cup Race 1 ===
Prague, Czech Republic hosted the first regular world cup race of the season from June 29 to July 1. Czech paddlers took full advantage of the home water by winning 3 golds, a silver and a bronze.

Event	Gold	Score	Silver	Score	Bronze	Score
C1 men	Stanislav Ježek (CZE)	191.57	Michal Martikán (SVK)	191.71	David Florence (GBR)	198.10
C2 men	Slovakia; Pavol Hochschorner; Peter Hochschorner	201.97	Czech Republic; Marek Jiras; Tomáš Máder	206.33	China; Hu Minghai; Shu Junrong	210.87
K1 men	Vavřinec Hradilek (CZE)	186.19	Fabian Dörfler (GER)	186.89	Ivan Pišvejc (CZE)	187.05
K1 women	Štěpánka Hilgertová (CZE)	207.19	Violetta Oblinger-Peters (AUT)	210.46	Fiona Pennie (GBR)	211.87

=== World Cup Race 2 ===
The penultimate race took place in Tacen, Slovenia on July 7–8. Slovakia won the medal table with 2 golds and a silver while the home Slovenian paddlers captured 1 gold and 1 silver.

Event	Gold	Score	Silver	Score	Bronze	Score
C1 men	Michal Martikán (SVK)	197.20	Dejan Stevanovič (SLO)	198.58	Nico Bettge (GER)	199.68
C2 men	Slovakia; Pavol Hochschorner; Peter Hochschorner	204.22	United Kingdom; Tim Baillie; Etienne Stott	205.93	Germany; Felix Michel; Sebastian Piersig	215.35
K1 men	Jure Meglič (SLO)	181.71	Scott Parsons (USA)	183.76	Fabian Dörfler (GER)	184.03
K1 women	Mandy Planert (GER)	199.56	Jana Dukátová (SVK)	200.88	Štěpánka Hilgertová (CZE)	208.57

=== World Cup Race 3 ===
The series concluded with the race in Augsburg, Germany on July 13–15. Germany topped the medal table with 3 golds and 2 silvers.

Event	Gold	Score	Silver	Score	Bronze	Score
C1 men	Nico Bettge (GER)	193.71	Robin Bell (AUS)	195.45	David Florence (GBR)	196.21
C2 men	Slovakia; Pavol Hochschorner; Peter Hochschorner	204.43	Czech Republic; Marek Jiras; Tomáš Máder	212.76	Slovakia; Ladislav Škantár; Peter Škantár	214.25
K1 men	Alexander Grimm (GER)	182.67	Erik Pfannmöller (GER)	183.91	Michael Kurt (SUI)	184.28
K1 women	Jennifer Bongardt (GER)	205.71	Jasmin Schornberg (GER)	208.22	Jana Dukátová (SVK)	209.40
