= 1998 Canoe Slalom World Cup =

World Cup

The 1998 Canoe Slalom World Cup was a series of five races in 4 canoeing and kayaking categories organized by the International Canoe Federation (ICF). It was the 11th edition. The series consisted of 4 regular world cup races and the world cup final.

== Calendar ==
| Label | Venue | Date |
|---|---|---|
| World Cup Race 1 | (Slovakia) Liptovský Mikuláš | 13–14 June |
| World Cup Race 2 | (Slovenia) Tacen | 20–21 June |
| World Cup Race 3 | (Germany) Augsburg | 27–28 June |
| World Cup Race 4 | (United States) Wausau | 31 July - 2 August |
| World Cup Final | (Spain) La Seu d'Urgell | 11–13 September |

== Final standings ==
The winner of each world cup race was awarded 30 points. The points scale reached down to 1 point for 20th place in the men's K1, while in the other three categories only the top 15 received points (with 6 points for 15th place). Only the best two results of each athlete from the first 4 world cups plus the result from the world cup final counted for the final world cup standings. Furthermore, an athlete or boat had to compete in the world cup final in order to be classified in the world cup rankings.

=== C1 men ===
| Pos | Athlete | Points |
|---|---|---|
| 1 | Michal Martikán (SVK) | 80 |
| 2 | Patrice Estanguet (FRA) | 66 |
| 3 | Hervé Delamarre (FRA) | 65 |
| 4 | Emmanuel Brugvin (FRA) | 60 |
| 5 | Juraj Minčík (SVK) | 57 |
| 6 | Lukáš Pollert (CZE) | 55 |
| 6 | Stanislav Ježek (CZE) | 55 |
| 8 | Krzysztof Bieryt (POL) | 51 |
| 9 | Tony Estanguet (FRA) | 43 |
| 10 | David Hearn (USA) | 42 |

=== C2 men ===
| Pos | Athletes | Points |
|---|---|---|
| 1 | Roman Štrba/Roman Vajs (SVK) | 68 |
| 2 | Marek Jiras/Tomáš Máder (CZE) | 65 |
| 3 | Éric Biau/Bertrand Daille (FRA) | 61 |
| 4 | Petr Štercl/Pavel Štercl (CZE) | 59 |
| 5 | Jaroslav Volf/Ondřej Štěpánek (CZE) | 54 |
| 6 | Jaroslav Pospíšil/Jaroslav Pollert (CZE) | 48 |
| 7 | Matt Taylor/Lecky Haller (USA) | 46 |
| 7 | Milan Kubáň/Marián Olejník (SVK) | 46 |
| 9 | Nathanael Fouquet/Alexandre Lauvergne (FRA) | 43 |
| 10 | Philippe Quémerais/Yann Le Pennec (FRA) | 41 |

=== K1 men ===
| Pos | Athlete | Points |
|---|---|---|
| 1 | Paul Ratcliffe (GBR) | 85 |
| 2 | Scott Shipley (USA) | 63 |
| 3 | Pierpaolo Ferrazzi (ITA) | 57 |
| 4 | Andraž Vehovar (SLO) | 55 |
| 5 | Thomas Becker (GER) | 53 |
| 6 | Helmut Oblinger (AUT) | 52 |
| 7 | David Ford (CAN) | 45 |
| 8 | Enrico Lazzarotto (ITA) | 41 |
| 9 | Ian Raspin (GBR) | 40 |
| 10 | Ian Wiley (IRL) | 36 |

=== K1 women ===
| Pos | Athlete | Points |
|---|---|---|
| 1 | Štěpánka Hilgertová (CZE) | 75 |
| 2 | Elena Kaliská (SVK) | 70 |
| 3 | Brigitte Guibal (FRA) | 59 |
| 4 | Kordula Striepecke (GER) | 57 |
| 5 | Margaret Langford (CAN) | 50 |
| 6 | María Eizmendi (ESP) | 49 |
| 7 | Sandra Friedli (SUI) | 47 |
| 8 | Gabriela Brosková (SVK) | 45 |
| 9 | Cathy Hearn (USA) | 44 |
| 10 | Heather Corrie (GBR) | 41 |

== Results ==
=== World Cup Race 1 ===
The first world cup race of the season took place at the Ondrej Cibak Whitewater Slalom Course in Liptovský Mikuláš, Slovakia from 13 to 14 June.

| Event | Gold | Score | Silver | Score | Bronze | Score |
|---|---|---|---|---|---|---|
| C1 men | Emmanuel Brugvin (FRA) | 214.70 | Krzysztof Bieryt (POL) | 216.56 | Lukáš Pollert (CZE) | 218.06 |
| C2 men | Czech Republic; Marek Jiras; Tomáš Máder | 230.14 | Czech Republic; Jaroslav Volf; Ondřej Štěpánek | 232.24 | Czech Republic; Jaroslav Pospíšil; Jaroslav Pollert | 233.10 |
| K1 men | Scott Shipley (USA) | 205.65 | Pierpaolo Ferrazzi (ITA) | 206.78 | Ian Raspin (GBR) | 209.24 |
| K1 women | Elena Kaliská (SVK) | 224.74 | Štěpánka Hilgertová (CZE) | 228.66 | Gabriela Brosková (SVK) | 231.28 |

=== World Cup Race 2 ===
The second world cup race of the season took place at the Tacen Whitewater Course, Slovenia from 20 to 21 June.

| Event | Gold | Score | Silver | Score | Bronze | Score |
|---|---|---|---|---|---|---|
| C1 men | Michal Martikán (SVK) | 202.14 | Hervé Delamarre (FRA) | 209.05 | Juraj Minčík (SVK) | 209.19 |
| C2 men | Slovakia; Milan Kubáň; Marián Olejník | 224.27 | Slovakia; Roman Štrba; Roman Vajs | 226.48 | France; Frank Adisson; Wilfrid Forgues | 227.02 |
| K1 men | Paul Ratcliffe (GBR) | 188.01 | Andraž Vehovar (SLO) | 189.67 | Ian Raspin (GBR) | 190.71 |
| K1 women | Brigitte Guibal (FRA) | 232.81 | Evi Huss (GER) | 234.18 | Elena Kaliská (SVK) | 241.53 |

=== World Cup Race 3 ===
The third world cup race of the season took place at the Augsburg Eiskanal, Germany from 27 to 28 June.

| Event | Gold | Score | Silver | Score | Bronze | Score |
|---|---|---|---|---|---|---|
| C1 men | Stanislav Ježek (CZE) | 228.61 | Patrice Estanguet (FRA) | 230.34 | Michal Martikán (SVK) | 231.52 |
| C2 men | France; Frank Adisson; Wilfrid Forgues | 233.75 | Poland; Krzysztof Kołomański; Michał Staniszewski | 241.75 | Germany; André Ehrenberg; Michael Senft | 241.85 |
| K1 men | Thomas Becker (GER) | 215.75 | Enrico Lazzarotto (ITA) | 216.03 | Scott Shipley (USA) | 217.26 |
| K1 women | Sandra Friedli (SUI) | 257.46 | Kordula Striepecke (GER) | 258.80 | Štěpánka Hilgertová (CZE) | 261.14 |

=== World Cup Race 4 ===
The fourth world cup race of the season took place in Wausau, Wisconsin from 31 July to 2 August.

| Event | Gold | Score | Silver | Score | Bronze | Score |
|---|---|---|---|---|---|---|
| C1 men | Emmanuel Brugvin (FRA) | 245.99 | Hervé Delamarre (FRA) | 249.16 | Juraj Minčík (SVK) | 250.00 |
| C2 men | France; Éric Biau; Bertrand Daille | 265.33 | France; Nathanael Fouquet; Alexandre Lauvergne | 266.93 | United States; Matt Taylor; Lecky Haller | 268.96 |
| K1 men | Scott Shipley (USA) | 233.82 | Paul Ratcliffe (GBR) | 237.62 | David Ford (CAN) | 242.17 |
| K1 women | Cathy Hearn (USA) | 273.52 | Margaret Langford (CAN) | 273.94 | Peggy Dickens (FRA) | 274.51 |

=== World Cup Final ===
The final world cup race of the season took place at the Segre Olympic Park in La Seu d'Urgell, Spain from 11 to 13 September.

| Event | Gold | Score | Silver | Score | Bronze | Score |
|---|---|---|---|---|---|---|
| C1 men | Michal Martikán (SVK) | 208.44 | Patrice Estanguet (FRA) | 213.93 | Lukáš Pollert (CZE) | 214.21 |
| C2 men | Slovakia; Roman Štrba; Roman Vajs | 223.00 | Czech Republic; Petr Štercl; Pavel Štercl | 228.89 | Czech Republic; Marek Jiras; Tomáš Máder | 229.14 |
| K1 men | Paul Ratcliffe (GBR) | 200.49 | Helmut Oblinger (AUT) | 201.13 | Thomas Schmidt (GER) | 202.90 |
| K1 women | Štěpánka Hilgertová (CZE) | 224.68 | María Eizmendi (ESP) | 232.30 | Elena Kaliská (SVK) | 236.78 |
