= Pavol Hric =

Slovak slalom canoeist (born 1976)

Personal information
- Nationality: Slovak
- Born: 1976 (age 49–50)
- Years active: 1994 - 2004

Sport
- Country: Slovakia
- Sport: Canoe slalom
- Event: K1, C2
Medal record
Men's canoe slalom
Representing Slovakia
European Championships
Gold medal – first place	2002 Bratislava	C2 team
Junior World Championships
Gold medal – first place	1994 Wausau	K1

Pavol Hric (born 1976) is a retired Slovak slalom canoeist who competed at the international level from 1994 to 2004, specializing initially in the K1 discipline and since 2001 in C2, where he was partnered by Roman Vajs. He competed in K1 internationally until 1998.

Hric won a gold medal in the C2 team event at the 2002 European Championships in Bratislava. He is also the junior world champion in the K1 event, a title he won in Wausau in 1994.

He has one World Cup victory, which he achieved in C2 with Vajs in 2002 in Tacen.

== Career statistics ==
=== Major championships results timeline ===
Event		1995	1996	1997	1998	1999	2000	2001	2002	2003
World Championships	K1	41	Not held	47	Not held	—	Not held		—	—
World Championships	C2	—	Not held	—	Not held	—	Not held		18	15
World Championships	K1 team	8	Not held	—	Not held	—	Not held		—	—
World Championships	C2 team	—	Not held	—	Not held	—	Not held		6	6
European Championships	K1	Not held	31	Not held	28	Not held	—	Not held	—	Not held
European Championships	C2	Not held	—	Not held	—	Not held	—	Not held	5	Not held
European Championships	K1 team	Not held	4	Not held	5	Not held	—	Not held	—	Not held
European Championships	C2 team	Not held	—	Not held	—	Not held	—	Not held	1	Not held

=== World Cup individual podiums ===
Season	Date	Venue	Position	Event
2002	28 Jul 2002	Tacen	1st	C2
