= Marián Olejník =

Slovak slalom canoeist (born 1976)

Personal information
- Nationality: Slovak
- Born: 1976 (age 49–50)

Sport
- Country: Slovakia
- Sport: Canoe slalom
- Event: C2
Medal record
Men's canoe slalom
Representing Slovakia
World Championships
Silver medal – second place	1999 La Seu d'Urgell	C2 team
Silver medal – second place	2005 Penrith	C2
Bronze medal – third place	2006 Prague	C2 team
European Championships
Gold medal – first place	2002 Bratislava	C2 team
Gold medal – first place	2005 Tacen	C2 team
Silver medal – second place	1998 Roudnice nad Labem	C2 team
Bronze medal – third place	1996 Augsburg	C2 team
Bronze medal – third place	1998 Roudnice nad Labem	C2

Marián Olejník (born 1976) is a Slovak slalom canoeist who competed at the international level from 1993 to 2007, specializing in the C2 event.

He and his partner in the boat Milan Kubáň won three medals at the ICF Canoe Slalom World Championships with two silvers (C2: 2005, C2 team: 1999) and a bronze (C2 team: 2006). The silver medal in the C2 event at the 2005 World Championships in Penrith was their greatest achievement.

At the European Championships Kubáň and Olejník won a total of 5 medals (2 golds, 1 silver and 2 bronzes), including a bronze medal in the C2 event at the 1998 European Championships in Roudnice nad Labem. The remaining four medals have come from team events.

They have earned a total of eight World Cup podiums, including 4 wins.

== Career statistics ==
=== Major championships results timeline ===
Event		1993	1994	1995	1996	1997	1998	1999	2000	2001	2002	2003	2004	2005	2006
World Championships	C2	27	Not held	17	Not held	6	Not held	4	Not held		7	—	Not held	2	11
World Championships	C2 team	—	Not held	4	Not held	4	Not held	2	Not held		6	—	Not held	—	3
European Championships	C2	Not held			9	Not held	3	Not held	8	Not held	7	Not held	5	11	8
European Championships	C2 team	Not held			3	Not held	2	Not held	—	Not held	1	Not held	2 (Note: Not a medal event due to low number of participating nations)	1	5

=== World Cup individual podiums ===
Season	Date	Venue	Position	Event
1996	25 Aug 1996	Prague	1st	C2
1997	6 Jul 1997	Bratislava	1st	C2
1998	21 Jun 1998	Tacen	1st	C2
1999	22 Aug 1999	Augsburg	3rd	C2
2001	3 Jun 2001	Merano	3rd	C2
2002	28 Jul 2002	Tacen	2nd	C2
2003	11 May 2003	Penrith	1st	C2
2005	2 Oct 2005	Penrith	2nd	C2^{1}

^{1} World Championship counting for World Cup points
