= 2001 Canoe Slalom World Cup =

The 2001 Canoe Slalom World Cup was a series of six races in 4 canoeing and kayaking categories organized by the International Canoe Federation (ICF). It was the 14th edition. The series consisted of 5 regular world cup races and the world cup final.

== Calendar ==
Label	Venue	Date
World Cup Race 1	(France) Goumois	26–27 May
World Cup Race 2	(Italy) Merano	2–3 June
World Cup Race 3	(Slovenia) Tacen	9–10 June
World Cup Race 4	(Germany) Augsburg	27–29 July
World Cup Race 5	(Czech Republic) Prague	3–5 August
World Cup Final	(United States) Wausau	8–9 September

== Final standings ==
The winner of each world cup race was awarded 30 points. The world cup final points scale was multiplied by a factor of 1.5. That meant the winner of the world cup final earned 45 points. The points scale reached down to 1 point for 20th place in the men's K1, while in the other three categories only the top 15 received points (with 6 points for 15th place). Only the best three results of each athlete counted for the final world cup standings.

=== C1 men ===
Pos	Athlete	Points
1	Michal Martikán (SVK)	95
2	Juraj Minčík (SVK)	85.5
3	Stefan Pfannmöller (GER)	74.5
4	Krzysztof Bieryt (POL)	70
5	Robin Bell (AUS)	66.5
6	Mariusz Wieczorek (POL)	62
7	Emmanuel Brugvin (FRA)	55
8	Simon Hočevar (SLO)	54
9	Patrice Estanguet (FRA)	50.5
10	Stuart McIntosh (GBR)	50

=== C2 men ===
Pos	Athletes	Points
1	Pavol Hochschorner/Peter Hochschorner (SVK)	105
2	Andrzej Wójs/Sławomir Mordarski (POL)	90
3	André Ehrenberg/Michael Senft (GER)	79.5
4	Jaroslav Pospíšil/Jaroslav Pollert (CZE)	75.5
5	Marek Jiras/Tomáš Máder (CZE)	61
6	Milan Kubáň/Marián Olejník (SVK)	59.5
7	Kai Walter/Frank Henze (GER)	55
7	Christophe Luquet/Pierre Luquet (FRA)	55
9	Marcus Becker/Stefan Henze (GER)	52
10	Jaroslav Volf/Ondřej Štěpánek (CZE)	43

=== K1 men ===
Pos	Athlete	Points
1	Thomas Schmidt (GER)	100
2	Dejan Kralj (SLO)	76
3	Helmut Oblinger (AUT)	69
4	Tomáš Kobes (CZE)	68
5	Benoît Peschier (FRA)	61.5
6	Fabien Lefèvre (FRA)	59.5
7	Peter Cibák (SVK)	58.5
8	David Ford (CAN)	58
9	Laurent Burtz (FRA)	56
10	Pierpaolo Ferrazzi (ITA)	50

=== K1 women ===
Pos	Athlete	Points
1	Elena Kaliská (SVK)	95
2	Mandy Planert (GER)	92.5
3	Štěpánka Hilgertová (CZE)	85
4	Irena Pavelková (CZE)	75.5
5	Marcela Sadilová (CZE)	65
6	Rebecca Giddens (USA)	62
7	Peggy Dickens (FRA)	57
8	Gabriela Stacherová (SVK)	56
9	Violetta Oblinger-Peters (AUT)	44.5
10	Marie Gaspard (FRA)	43

== Results ==
=== World Cup Race 1 ===
The first world cup race of the season took place in Goumois, France from 26 to 27 May.

Event	Gold	Score	Silver	Score	Bronze	Score
C1 men	Juraj Minčík (SVK)	226.57	Mariusz Wieczorek (POL)	232.35	Danko Herceg (CRO)	235.94
C2 men	Slovakia; Pavol Hochschorner; Peter Hochschorner	235.93	Czech Republic; Jaroslav Pospíšil; Jaroslav Pollert	240.84	France; Christophe Luquet; Pierre Luquet	245.34
K1 men	Benoît Peschier (FRA)	220.24	Laurent Burtz (FRA)	220.39	Tomáš Kobes (CZE)	220.82
K1 women	Štěpánka Hilgertová (CZE)	242.70	Irena Pavelková (CZE)	249.03	Peggy Dickens (FRA)	249.11

=== World Cup Race 2 ===
The second world cup race of the season took place in Merano, Italy from 2 to 3 June.

Event	Gold	Score	Silver	Score	Bronze	Score
C1 men	Patrice Estanguet (FRA)	210.14	Juraj Minčík (SVK)	211.23	Stefan Pfannmöller (GER)	211.29
C2 men	Slovakia; Pavol Hochschorner; Peter Hochschorner	217.18	Germany; André Ehrenberg; Michael Senft	222.41	Slovakia; Milan Kubáň; Marián Olejník	222.91
K1 men	Benoît Peschier (FRA)	199.51	Helmut Oblinger (AUT)	199.59	Laurent Burtz (FRA)	200.18
K1 women	Elena Kaliská (SVK)	222.46	Margaret Langford (CAN)	222.66	Irena Pavelková (CZE)	222.84

=== World Cup Race 3 ===
The third world cup race of the season took place at the Tacen Whitewater Course, Slovenia from 9 to 10 June.

Event	Gold	Score	Silver	Score	Bronze	Score
C1 men	Michal Martikán (SVK)	193.41	Krzysztof Bieryt (POL)	196.78	Simon Hočevar (SLO)	198.12
C2 men	Poland; Andrzej Wójs; Sławomir Mordarski	209.29	Czech Republic; Jaroslav Pospíšil; Jaroslav Pollert	210.67	Czech Republic; Marek Jiras; Tomáš Máder	210.91
K1 men	Dejan Kralj (SLO)	189.09	Peter Cibák (SVK)	190.81	Helmut Oblinger (AUT)	190.95
K1 women	Marcela Sadilová (CZE)	218.05	Štěpánka Hilgertová (CZE)	221.61	Violetta Oblinger-Peters (AUT)	227.57

=== World Cup Race 4 ===
The fourth world cup race of the season took place at the Augsburg Eiskanal, Germany from 27 to 29 July.

Event	Gold	Score	Silver	Score	Bronze	Score
C1 men	Juraj Minčík (SVK)	205.55	Robin Bell (AUS)	205.80	Michal Martikán (SVK)	206.41
C2 men	Poland; Andrzej Wójs; Sławomir Mordarski	219.28	Czech Republic; Marek Jiras; Tomáš Máder	220.39	Germany; Marcus Becker; Stefan Henze	222.02
K1 men	Thomas Schmidt (GER)	197.08	Pierpaolo Ferrazzi (ITA)	198.07	Helmut Oblinger (AUT)	199.91
K1 women	Štěpánka Hilgertová (CZE)	220.59	Mandy Planert (GER)	220.69	Gabriela Stacherová (SVK)	229.09

=== World Cup Race 5 ===
The fifth world cup race of the season took place at the Prague-Troja Canoeing Centre, Czech Republic from 3 to 5 August.

Event	Gold	Score	Silver	Score	Bronze	Score
C1 men	Krzysztof Bieryt (POL)	171.30	Robin Bell (AUS)	172.52	Mariusz Wieczorek (POL)	172.73
C2 men	Poland; Andrzej Wójs; Sławomir Mordarski	180.24	Czech Republic; Jaroslav Pospíšil; Jaroslav Pollert	180.74	Slovakia; Pavol Hochschorner; Peter Hochschorner	182.00
K1 men	Tomáš Kobes (CZE)	162.73	Thomas Schmidt (GER)	163.39	David Ford (CAN)	165.64
K1 women	Mandy Planert (GER)	179.60	Irena Pavelková (CZE)	180.48	Elena Kaliská (SVK)	183.03

=== World Cup Final ===
The final world cup race of the season took place in Wausau, Wisconsin from 8 to 9 September.

Event	Gold	Score	Silver	Score	Bronze	Score
C1 men	Michal Martikán (SVK)	210.39	Stefan Pfannmöller (GER)	214.83	Stuart McIntosh (GBR)	215.07
C2 men	Slovakia; Pavol Hochschorner; Peter Hochschorner	218.38	Germany; André Ehrenberg; Michael Senft	226.15	France; Philippe Quémerais; Yann Le Pennec	226.59
K1 men	Thomas Schmidt (GER)	199.92	Fabien Lefèvre (FRA)	203.97	Dejan Kralj (SLO)	204.08
K1 women	Elena Kaliská (SVK)	224.70	Mandy Planert (GER)	228.04	Rebecca Giddens (USA)	229.51
