= Elena Kaliská =

Slovak slalom canoeist

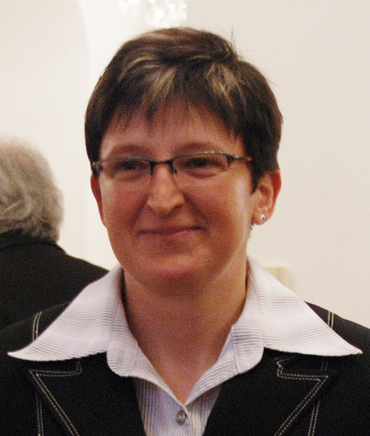
- Kaliská in 2011

Personal information
- Nationality: Slovak
- Born: 19 January 1972 (age 54) Zvolen, Czechoslovakia
- Height: 1.72 m (5 ft 8 in)
- Weight: 66 kg (146 lb)
- Website: www.elenakaliska.com

Sport
- Country: Slovakia
- Sport: Canoe slalom
- Event: K1
- Club: Kanoe Tatra Klub [KTK]: Liptovský Mikuláš
- Retired: 2021
Medal record
Women's canoe slalom
Event	1st	2nd	3rd
Olympic Games	2	0	0
World Championships	2	2	1
European Championships	8	4	4
Junior World Championships	0	1	0
Total	12	7	5
Representing Czechoslovakia
Junior World Championships
Silver medal – second place	1990 Tavanasa	K1 team
Representing Slovakia
Olympic Games
Gold medal – first place	2004 Athens	K1
Gold medal – first place	2008 Beijing	K1
World Championships
Gold medal – first place	2005 Penrith	K1
Gold medal – first place	2011 Bratislava	K1 team
Silver medal – second place	2007 Foz do Iguaçu	K1
Silver medal – second place	2009 La Seu d'Urgell	K1 team
Bronze medal – third place	2014 Deep Creek Lake	K1 team
European Championships
Gold medal – first place	1998 Roudnice nad Labem	K1
Gold medal – first place	2000 Mezzana	K1 team
Gold medal – first place	2002 Bratislava	K1
Gold medal – first place	2004 Skopje	K1
Gold medal – first place	2005 Tacen	K1 team
Gold medal – first place	2006 L'Argentière-la-Bessée	K1
Gold medal – first place	2006 L'Argentière-la-Bessée	K1 team
Gold medal – first place	2009 Nottingham	K1
Silver medal – second place	2002 Bratislava	K1 team
Silver medal – second place	2007 Liptovský Mikuláš	K1 team
Silver medal – second place	2008 Kraków	K1 team
Silver medal – second place	2009 Nottingham	K1 team
Bronze medal – third place	1996 Augsburg	K1
Bronze medal – third place	2011 La Seu d'Urgell	K1 team
Bronze medal – third place	2012 Augsburg	K1 team
Bronze medal – third place	2016 Liptovský Mikuláš	K1 team

Elena Kaliská (born 19 January 1972) is a retired Slovak slalom canoeist who competed at the international level from 1988 to 2019. She specialized in the K1 event, which was the only discipline available for women during the vast majority of her career.

Competing in four Summer Olympics, she won two gold medals in the K1 event, earning them in 2004 and 2008.

Kaliská also won five medals at the ICF Canoe Slalom World Championships with two golds (K1: 2005, K1 team: 2011), two silvers (K1: 2007, K1 team: 2009) and a bronze (K1 team: 2014).

She has won the overall World Cup title 6 times (2000-2001, 2003–2006), which is a record the K1 discipline.

At the European Championships she won a total of 16 medals (8 golds, 4 silvers and 4 bronzes).

In 2021, she won a gold medal in K1 at inaugural ICF Masters Canoe Slalom World Championship in Kraków.

She announced her retirement from the sport during the 2021 World Championships in Bratislava, where she performed demo runs. Kaliská began competing in canoe slalom as soon as 1979.

== Career ==
Kaliská represented Czechoslovakia at two World Junior Championships, winning a silver medal in the K1 team event in 1990 and finishing 4th in the K1 event.

She made her World Championship debut in 1993 in Mezzana where she finished 9th in the K1 event. Her first medal came at the World Cup in Prague in 1996, where she took bronze. She followed it up with another bronze one week later at the inaugural European Championships in Augsburg.

She recorded her first World Cup win in 1998 on her home course in Liptovský Mikuláš and followed it up by winning her first European title in Roudnice nad Labem.

In 2000 she won the overall World Cup title in K1 for the first time in her career. She defended the title in 2001 and then went on to win four consecutive titles from 2003 to 2006. Her dominance was most pronounced in 2004, when she won 4 out of 6 World Cup races (having only started in 5 races).

Despite her success in the World Cup, she had to wait until 2004 to claim her first major global medal. She finally broke through by winning the Olympic gold at the Athens games. One year later she claimed her only individual world title in Penrith.

In order to qualify for the 2008 Summer Olympics, she had to defeat the 2006 World Champion Jana Dukátová in the internal qualification. She managed to secure her spot by taking silver medal at the 2007 ICF Canoe Slalom World Championships. She won the 2008 Olympic gold in a dominant fashion, winning the heats, semifinal run and the final run. In a race where many of the big favorites struggled she was able to stay clean and win by a margin of 14.30 seconds.

Kaliská had a long career spanning several decades, similar to her great rival Štěpánka Hilgertová in longevity and success. She had her final international race in 2019 and officially retired in 2021.

She won all the major accolades that the sport of canoe slalom has to offer - Olympic gold, World Championship gold, World Cup and European Championships.

== Career statistics ==
=== Major championships results timeline ===
Event		1993	1994	1995	1996	1997	1998	1999	2000	2001	2002	2003	2004	2005	2006
Olympic Games	K1	Not held			19	Not held			4	Not held			1	Not held	
World Championships	K1	9	Not held	19	Not held	7	Not held	6	Not held		10	11	Not held	1	4
World Championships	K1 team	7	Not held	8	Not held	5	Not held	4	Not held		4	6	Not held	DNF	4
European Championships	K1	Not held			3	Not held	1	Not held	4	Not held	1	Not held	1	6	1
European Championships	K1 team	Not held			7	Not held	4	Not held	1	Not held	2	Not held	2 (Note: Not a medal event due to low number of participating nations)	1	1

Event		2007	2008	2009	2010	2011	2012	2013	2014	2015	2016	2017	2018	2019
Olympic Games	K1	Not held	1	Not held			—	Not held			—	Not held		
World Championships	K1	2	Not held	9	—	7	Not held	9	33	39	Not held	28	15	37
World Championships	K1 team	4	Not held	2	—	1	Not held	6	3	5	Not held	7	11	6
European Championships	K1	8	4	1	—	17	18	26	8	—	4	24	23	31
European Championships	K1 team	2	2	2	—	3	3	4	7	—	3	10	12	6

=== World Cup individual podiums ===
	1st place, gold medalist(s)	2nd place, silver medalist(s)	3rd place, bronze medalist(s)	Total
K1	14	9	9	32

Season	Date	Venue	Position	Event
1996	25 August 1996	Prague	3rd	K1
1996	29 September 1996	Três Coroas	3rd	K1
1998	14 June 1998	Liptovský Mikuláš	1st	K1
1998	21 June 1998	Tacen	3rd	K1
1998	13 September 1998	La Seu d'Urgell	3rd	K1
1999	20 June 1999	Tacen	2nd	K1
1999	15 August 1999	Bratislava	3rd	K1
2000	30 April 2000	Penrith	2nd	K1
2000	9 July 2000	La Seu d'Urgell	2nd	K1
2000	30 July 2000	Augsburg	1st	K1
2001	3 June 2001	Merano	1st	K1
2001	5 August 2001	Prague	3rd	K1
2001	9 September 2001	Wausau	1st	K1
2002	21 July 2002	Augsburg	2nd	K1
2002	14 September 2002	Tibagi	3rd	K1
2003	13 July 2003	Tacen	3rd	K1
2003	31 July 2003	Bratislava	2nd	K1
2003	3 August 2003	Bratislava	2nd	K1
2004	23 April 2004	Athens	1st	K1
2004	30 May 2004	Merano	1st	K1
2004	11 July 2004	Prague	1st	K1
2004	25 July 2004	Bourg St.-Maurice	1st	K1
2005	24 July 2005	La Seu d'Urgell	2nd	K1
2005	1 October 2005	Penrith	1st	K1^{1}
2006	4 June 2006	Augsburg	1st	K1
2006	11 June 2006	La Seu d'Urgell	3rd	K1
2006	2 July 2006	L'Argentière-la-Bessée	1st	K1^{2}
2008	16 March 2008	Penrith	1st	K1^{3}
2009	5 July 2009	Bratislava	1st	K1
2010	27 June 2010	La Seu d'Urgell	2nd	K1
2011	14 August 2011	Prague	1st	K1
2013	23 June 2013	Cardiff	2nd	K1

^{1} World Championship counting for World Cup points
^{2} European Championship counting for World Cup points
^{3} Oceania Championship counting for World Cup points

Awards
Preceded by Martina Moravcová	Sportsperson of Slovakia; 2004	Succeeded by Dominik Hrbatý
Olympic Games
Preceded by Michal Martikán	Flagbearer for Slovakia; Beijing 2008	Succeeded by Jozef Gönci
