= 2000 European Canoe Slalom Championships =

The 2000 European Canoe Slalom Championships took place in Mezzana, Italy between June 24 and 25, 2000 under the auspices of the European Canoe Association (ECA). It was the 3rd edition. The competitors took part in 8 events, but medals were awarded for only 7 of them. The C2 team event only had 3 teams participating. An event must have at least 5 nations taking part in order to count as a medal event.

== Medal summary ==
=== Men's results ===
==== Canoe ====
Event	Gold	Points	Silver	Points	Bronze	Points
C1	Tony Estanguet (FRA)	226.90	Juraj Minčík (SVK)	227.47	Lukáš Pollert (CZE)	228.07
C1 team	Slovakia; Michal Martikán; Dušan Ovčarík; Juraj Minčík	130.09	Czech Republic; Přemysl Vlk; Lukáš Pollert; Tomáš Indruch	133.43	Spain; Jordi Sangrá Gibert; Jon Ergüín; Jordi Domenjó	134.22
C2	Slovakia; Pavol Hochschorner; Peter Hochschorner	233.96	France; Frank Adisson; Wilfrid Forgues	235.39	Poland; Krzysztof Kołomański; Michał Staniszewski	235.85
C2 team (non-medal event)	Germany; Kai Walter & Frank Henze; Kay Simon & Robby Simon; André Ehrenberg & Michael Senft	139.00	Slovakia; Pavol Hochschorner & Peter Hochschorner; Roman Štrba & Roman Vajs; Ľuboš Šoška & Peter Šoška	139.18	Czech Republic; Jaroslav Volf & Ondřej Štěpánek; Jaroslav Pospíšil & Jaroslav Pollert; Marek Jiras & Tomáš Máder	140.03

==== Kayak ====
Event	Gold	Points	Silver	Points	Bronze	Points
K1	Pierpaolo Ferrazzi (ITA)	216.13	Thomas Becker (GER)	216.44	Laurent Burtz (FRA)	217.09
K1 team	Italy; Pierpaolo Ferrazzi; Enrico Lazzarotto; Matteo Pontarollo	122.77	Slovenia; Miha Terdič; Dejan Kralj; Fedja Marušič	122.81	Switzerland; Mathias Röthenmund; Michael Kurt; Beat Mosimann	124.50

=== Women's results ===
==== Kayak ====
Event	Gold	Points	Silver	Points	Bronze	Points
K1	Štěpánka Hilgertová (CZE)	236.83	Brigitte Guibal (FRA)	237.65	Irena Pavelková (CZE)	238.93
K1 team	Slovakia; Elena Kaliská; Gabriela Stacherová; Gabriela Brosková	140.91	Czech Republic; Marcela Sadilová; Štěpánka Hilgertová; Irena Pavelková	141.30	Germany; Mandy Planert; Evi Huss; Susanne Hirt	142.55

== Medal table ==
Rank	Nation	Gold	Silver	Bronze	Total
1	Slovakia (SVK)	3	1	0	4
2	Italy (ITA)	2	0	0	2
3	Czech Republic (CZE)	1	2	2	5
4	France (FRA)	1	2	1	4
5	Germany (GER)	0	1	1	2
6	Slovenia (SLO)	0	1	0	1
7	Poland (POL)	0	0	1	1
7	Spain (ESP)	0	0	1	1
7	Switzerland (SUI)	0	0	1	1
Totals (9 entries)		7	7	7	21
