= Le Pennec =

Le Pennec is a surname created from Breton Penneg (stubborn). Notable people with the surname include:

- Émilie Le Pennec (born 1987), French artistic gymnast
- Yann Le Pennec (born 1974), French slalom canoeist
