= Aline Tornare =

French slalom canoeist (born 1981)

Medal record

Women's canoe slalom

Representing France

World Championships
Gold medal – first place	2002 Bourg-Saint-Maurice	K1 team

European Championships
Bronze medal – third place	2006 L'Argentière-la-Bessée	K1 team

U23 European Championships
Bronze medal – third place	2002 Bratislava	K1

Aline Tornare (born 15 October 1981) is a French slalom canoeist who competed at the international level from 1998 to 2006.

She won a gold medal in the K1 team event at the 2002 ICF Canoe Slalom World Championships in Bourg-Saint-Maurice. She also won a bronze medal in the same event at the 2006 European Championships in L'Argentière-la-Bessée.
