= 2005 European Canoe Slalom Championships =

The 2005 European Canoe Slalom Championships took place at the Tacen Whitewater Course in Tacen, Slovenia between 24 and 26 June 2005 under the auspices of the European Canoe Association (ECA). It was the 6th edition.

== Medal summary ==
=== Men's results ===
==== Canoe ====
Event	Gold	Points	Silver	Points	Bronze	Points
C1	Stefan Pfannmöller (GER)	200.55	Alexander Slafkovský (SVK)	201.32	Stuart McIntosh (GBR)	201.74
C1 team	Slovakia; Juraj Minčík; Michal Martikán; Alexander Slafkovský	227.33	Germany; Nico Bettge; Jan Benzien; Stefan Pfannmöller	227.57	Czech Republic; Jan Mašek; Stanislav Ježek; Tomáš Indruch	230.12
C2	Czech Republic; Jaroslav Volf; Ondřej Štěpánek	211.60	Czech Republic; Marek Jiras; Tomáš Máder	212.82	Slovakia; Ladislav Škantár; Peter Škantár	213.08
C2 team	Slovakia; Pavol Hochschorner & Peter Hochschorner; Milan Kubáň & Marián Olejník; Ladislav Škantár & Peter Škantár	241.69	Germany; Kay Simon & Robby Simon; Marcus Becker & Stefan Henze; Christian Bahmann & Michael Senft	241.91	France; Philippe Quémerais & Yann Le Pennec; Christophe Luquet & Pierre Luquet; Martin Braud & Cédric Forgit	247.83

==== Kayak ====
Event	Gold	Points	Silver	Points	Bronze	Points
K1	Helmut Oblinger (AUT)	187.39	Peter Kauzer (SLO)	188.25	Erik Pfannmöller (GER)	188.86
K1 team	Slovenia; Andrej Nolimal; Peter Kauzer; Dejan Kralj	208.75	Germany; Erik Pfannmöller; Fabian Dörfler; Alexander Grimm	211.86	Italy; Pierpaolo Ferrazzi; Stefano Cipressi; Daniele Molmenti	213.75

=== Women's results ===
==== Kayak ====
Event	Gold	Points	Silver	Points	Bronze	Points
K1	Mandy Planert (GER)	216.01	Štěpánka Hilgertová (CZE)	216.32	Irena Pavelková (CZE)	219.08
K1 team	Slovakia; Gabriela Zamišková; Jana Dukátová; Elena Kaliská	253.49	Germany; Claudia Bär; Mandy Planert; Heike Frauenrath	263.61	Austria; Julia Schmid; Violetta Oblinger-Peters; Corinna Kuhnle	288.47

== Medal table ==
Rank	Nation	Gold	Silver	Bronze	Total
1	Slovakia (SVK)	3	1	1	5
2	Germany (GER)	2	4	1	7
3	Czech Republic (CZE)	1	2	2	5
4	Slovenia (SLO)	1	1	0	2
5	Austria (AUT)	1	0	1	2
6	France (FRA)	0	0	1	1
6	Great Britain (GBR)	0	0	1	1
6	Italy (ITA)	0	0	1	1
Totals (8 entries)		8	8	8	24
