= Thomas Becker (canoeist born 1967) =

German slalom canoeist (born 1967)

Medal record

Men's canoe slalom

Representing Germany

Olympic Games
| Bronze medal – third place | 1996 Atlanta | K1 |

World Championships
| Gold medal – first place | 1995 Nottingham | K1 team |
| Gold medal – first place | 1997 Três Coroas | K1 |
| Gold medal – first place | 1999 La Seu d'Urgell | K1 team |
| Gold medal – first place | 2002 Bourg St.-Maurice | K1 team |
| Silver medal – second place | 1991 Tacen | K1 team |
| Bronze medal – third place | 1997 Três Coroas | K1 team |

European Championships
| Gold medal – first place | 1996 Augsburg | K1 team |
| Gold medal – first place | 1998 Roudnice nad Labem | K1 team |
| Gold medal – first place | 2002 Bratislava | K1 team |
| Silver medal – second place | 1998 Roudnice nad Labem | K1 |
| Silver medal – second place | 2000 Mezzana | K1 |

Thomas Becker (born 6 July 1967 in Hilden) is a German slalom canoeist who competed from the late 1980s to the early 2000s (decade). Competing in two Summer Olympics, he won a bronze medal in the K1 event in Atlanta in 1996.

Becker also won six medals at the ICF Canoe Slalom World Championships with four golds (K1: 1997, K1 team: 1995, 1999, 2002), a silver (K1 team: 1991), and a bronze (K1 team: 1997).

He won the World Cup series in K1 in 1996. He also earned a total of five medals at the European Championships (3 golds and 2 silvers).

== World Cup individual podiums ==
| | 1st place, gold medalist(s) | 2nd place, silver medalist(s) | 3rd place, bronze medalist(s) | Total |
| K1 | 2 | 8 | 5 | 15 |

| Season | Date | Venue | Position | Event |
|---|---|---|---|---|
| 1993 | 18 July 1993 | La Seu d'Urgell | 3rd | K1 |
| 1993 | 31 August 1993 | Ocoee | 3rd | K1 |
| 1995 | 25 June 1995 | Prague | 1st | K1 |
| 1995 | 1 October 1995 | Ocoee | 2nd | K1 |
| 1996 | 21 April 1996 | Ocoee | 2nd | K1 |
| 1996 | 16 June 1996 | Augsburg | 2nd | K1 |
| 1996 | 29 September 1996 | Três Coroas | 2nd | K1 |
| 1997 | 22 June 1997 | Bourg St.-Maurice | 2nd | K1 |
| 1997 | 6 July 1997 | Bratislava | 2nd | K1 |
| 1997 | 3 August 1997 | Minden | 3rd | K1 |
| 1998 | 28 June 1998 | Augsburg | 1st | K1 |
| 1999 | 22 August 1999 | Augsburg | 3rd | K1 |
| 1999 | 3 October 1999 | Penrith | 2nd | K1 |
| 2000 | 30 July 2000 | Augsburg | 3rd | K1 |
| 2002 | 28 July 2002 | Tacen | 2nd | K1 |
