= Justin Boocock =

Australian slalom canoeist

Medal record

Men's canoe slalom

Representing Australia

Junior World Championships
Bronze medal – third place	1992 Sjoa	C1

Justin Boocock (born 24 April 1975) is an Australian slalom canoeist who competed at the international level from 1990 to 2004. He finished 16th in the C1 event at the 1996 Summer Olympics in Atlanta.

== World Cup individual podiums ==
Season	Date	Venue	Position	Event
1996	9 Jun 1996	La Seu d'Urgell	3rd	C1
2002	26 May 2002	Guangzhou	3rd	C1
2002	15 Sep 2002	Tibagi	3rd	C1
2003	11 May 2003	Penrith	1st	C1
