= Benoît Peschier =

French-Greek slalom canoeist (born 1980)

Medal record

Men's canoe slalom

Representing France

Olympic Games
Gold medal – first place	2004 Athens	K1

World Championships
Gold medal – first place	2005 Penrith	K1 team
Bronze medal – third place	2002 Bourg St.-Maurice	K1 team

Junior World Championships
Bronze medal – third place	1998 Lofer	K1 team

Benoît Pierre Peschier (born 21 May 1980 in Guilherand-Granges) is a French-Greek slalom canoeist who competed at the international level from 1997 to 2014. He represented Greece from 2009 to 2010. In 2013 he returned to the international scene representing France.

Peschier won a gold medal in the K1 event at the 2004 Summer Olympics in Athens. He also won two medals in the K1 team event at the ICF Canoe Slalom World Championships with a gold in 2005 and a bronze in 2002.

His younger brother Nicolas is a multiple medalist from world and European championships in canoe slalom. Their father Claude is world champion in the K1 event from 1969.

== World Cup individual podiums ==
Season	Date	Venue	Position	Event
2001	27 May 2001	Goumois	1st	K1
2001	3 Jun 2001	Merano	1st	K1
2002	26 May 2002	Guangzhou	2nd	K1
2002	4 Aug 2002	Prague	3rd	K1
2004	25 Jul 2004	Bourg St.-Maurice	2nd	K1
2008	5 Jul 2008	Augsburg	2nd	K1
