= Matteo Pontarollo =

Italian canoeist

Medal record

Men's canoe slalom

Representing Italy

World Championships
Silver medal – second place	2002 Bourg St.-Maurice	K1 team
Silver medal – second place	2005 Penrith	K1 team

European Championships
Gold medal – first place	2000 Mezzana	K1 team

Matteo Pontarollo (born 1974) is an Italian slalom canoeist who competed from the early 1990s to the late 2000s.

He won two silver medals in the K1 team event at the ICF Canoe Slalom World Championships, earning them in 2002 and 2005. He also won a gold medal in the same event at the 2000 European Championships in Mezzana.

== World Cup individual podiums ==
Season	Date	Venue	Position	Event
2005	24 Jul 2005	La Seu d'Urgell	3rd	K1
