= Thomas Monier =

French canoeist

Medal record

Men's canoe slalom

Representing France

World Championships
Bronze medal – third place	2002 Bourg St.-Maurice	K-1 team

Thomas Monier is a French slalom canoeist who competed from the late 1980s to the early 2000s. He won a silver medal in the K-1 team event at the 2002 ICF Canoe Slalom World Championships in Bourg St.-Maurice.
