= Peter Hochschorner =

Slovak slalom canoeist (born 1979)

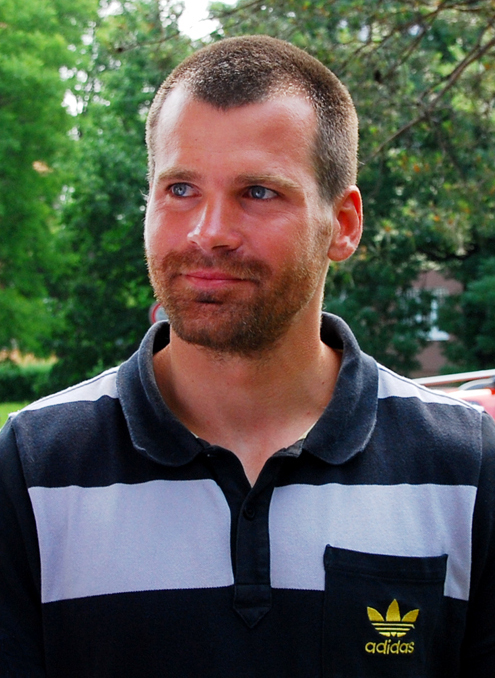
- Hochschorner in 2011

Personal information
- Nationality: Slovak
- Born: 7 September 1979 (age 46) Bratislava, Czechoslovakia
- Years active: 1996 - 2021
- Height: 1.88 m (6 ft 2 in)
- Weight: 85 kg (187 lb)

Sport
- Country: Slovakia
- Sport: Canoe slalom, Wildwater canoeing
- Event: C2
- Club: ŠKP Bratislava
- Coached by: Peter Hochschorner Sr.
- Retired: 2021
Medal record
Men's canoe slalom
Event	1st	2nd	3rd
Olympic Games	3	0	1
World Championships	6	4	4
European Championships	11	3	3
Junior European Championships	0	1	0
Total	20	8	8
Representing Slovakia
Olympic Games
Gold medal – first place	2000 Sydney	C2
Gold medal – first place	2004 Athens	C2
Gold medal – first place	2008 Beijing	C2
Bronze medal – third place	2012 London	C2
World Championships
Gold medal – first place	2002 Bourg St.-Maurice	C2
Gold medal – first place	2007 Foz do Iguaçu	C2
Gold medal – first place	2009 La Seu d'Urgell	C2
Gold medal – first place	2009 La Seu d'Urgell	C2 team
Gold medal – first place	2010 Tacen	C2
Gold medal – first place	2011 Bratislava	C2
Silver medal – second place	1999 La Seu d'Urgell	C2 team
Silver medal – second place	2011 Bratislava	C2 team
Silver medal – second place	2013 Prague	C2 team
Silver medal – second place	2014 Deep Creek Lake	C2 team
Bronze medal – third place	2003 Augsburg	C2
Bronze medal – third place	2006 Prague	C2
Bronze medal – third place	2006 Prague	C2 team
Bronze medal – third place	2007 Foz do Iguaçu	C2 team
European Championships
Gold medal – first place	1998 Roudnice nad Labem	C2
Gold medal – first place	2000 Mezzana	C2
Gold medal – first place	2002 Bratislava	C2
Gold medal – first place	2002 Bratislava	C2 team
Gold medal – first place	2005 Tacen	C2 team
Gold medal – first place	2008 Kraków	C2
Gold medal – first place	2009 Nottingham	C2
Gold medal – first place	2011 La Seu d'Urgell	C2
Gold medal – first place	2014 Vienna	C2 team
Gold medal – first place	2015 Markkleeberg	C2 team
Gold medal – first place	2016 Liptovský Mikuláš	C2 team
Silver medal – second place	1998 Roudnice nad Labem	C2 team
Silver medal – second place	2006 L'Argentière-la-Bessée	C2
Silver medal – second place	2012 Augsburg	C2
Bronze medal – third place	2007 Liptovský Mikuláš	C2
Bronze medal – third place	2008 Kraków	C2 team
Bronze medal – third place	2011 La Seu d'Urgell	C2 team
Junior European Championships
Silver medal – second place	1997 Nowy Sącz	C2

Peter Hochschorner (born 7 September 1979) is a retired Slovak slalom canoeist who competed at the international level from 1996 to 2017. Competing together with his twin brother Pavol Hochschorner, they are the most successful C2 paddlers in the history of canoe slalom. They retired from canoe slalom in 2018 after the C2 event was discontinued and subsequently switched to wildwater canoeing. They retired from wildwater canoeing after the 2021 World Championships in their hometown Bratislava.

Hochschorner won three Olympic gold medals in the C2 event, in 2000, 2004 and 2008 and one bronze medal in 2012.

He also won fourteen medals at the ICF Canoe Slalom World Championships with six golds (C2: 2002, 2007, 2009, 2010, 2011; C2 team: 2009), four silvers (C2 team: 1999, 2011, 2013, 2014) and four bronzes (C2: 2003, 2006; C2 team: 2006, 2007).

Hochschorner won the overall World Cup title 10 times (1999–2004, 2006–2008 and 2011) with his twin brother, which is a record in any category.

At the European Championships he won a total of 17 medals (11 golds, 3 silvers and 3 bronzes).

== Career ==
The Hochschorner twins made their first appearance on the international stage at the 1996 World Junior Canoe Slalom Championships where they finished in 15th position in the C2 event and 5th in the C2 team event. One year later they won a silver medal in the C2 event at the 1997 European Junior Canoe Slalom Championships. That year they also made their debut at the senior World Championships, finishing in 23rd position.

They won their first senior medals at the 1998 European Championships, where they won the individual event and took silver in the team event. The following year brought even more success as they won 3 out of 5 World Cup races as well as the overall title. They also earned their first World Championship medal, a silver in the team event.

The Hochschorners defended their overall World Cup title in 2000 and came to the 2000 Summer Olympics in Sydney as favorites. They won the two-run qualifying round to advance to the final. In the first run of the final they took a 2 second penalty which relegated them to the 2nd place behind defending champions Frank Adisson/Wilfrid Forgues. They then produced the fastest time of the day on the second run to clinch their first Olympic gold.

In 2002 they won their first World Championship gold in Bourg Saint Maurice, winning the individual C2 event. They continued to dominate the World Cup scene by winning the overall title 6 years in a row between 1999 and 2004. Thus they came to the 2004 Summer Olympics in Athens not only as defending champion, but also as overwhelming favorites. They were able to defend their title after posting the fastest times in both qualifying runs as well as the semifinal and then maintaining their advantage in the final.

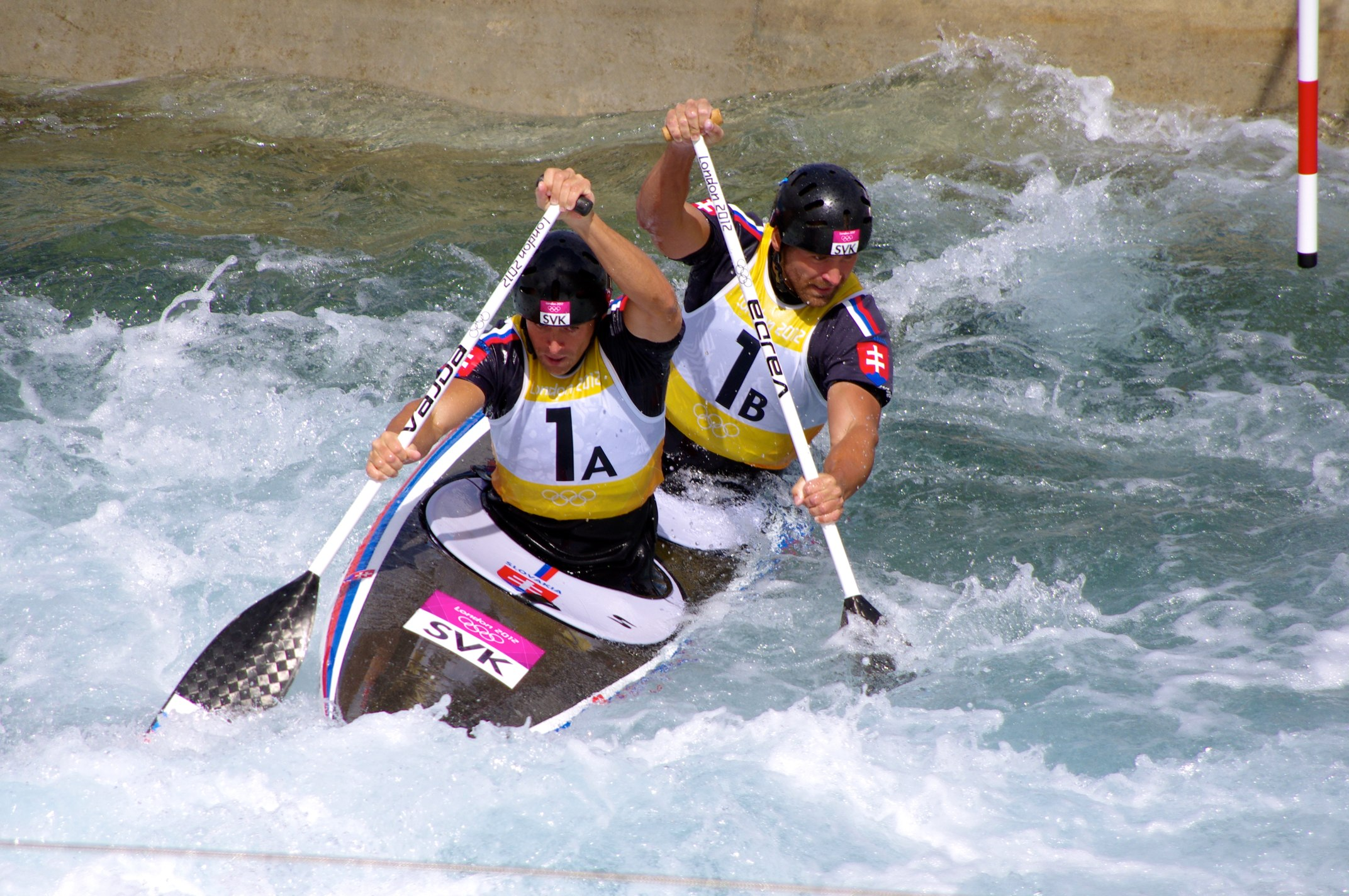
The Hochschorner brothers (Peter in rear) at the 2012 Summer Olympics

They had to wait until 2007 to win their second world title in Foz do Iguaçu. They completed their golden Olympic hattrick at the 2008 Summer Olympics in Beijing. Once again they won the qualification, then finished 2nd in the semifinal run, but were able to move up to 1st position with their run in the final. This was followed by another 3 gold medals at the World Championships between 2009 and 2011, which meant they went unbeaten in 5 straight global championships between 2007 and 2011.

Their unbeaten streak ended at the 2012 Summer Olympics in London, where they were beaten by both British boats, but still came away with a bronze medal. This would be their last major individual medal, not just at the Olympics. Their individual medal count also includes 5 golds and 2 bronzes from World Championships and 6 golds, 2 silvers and 1 bronze from the European Championships.

They missed the 2016 Summer Olympics after losing the internal qualification battle to eventual champions Ladislav Škantár and Peter Škantár.

They finished their career holding several all-time records in the sport of canoe slalom including most Olympic golds (3), most World Cup titles (10), and most World Cup victories (30). The last two records have been broken by Jessica Fox.

== Career statistics ==
=== Major championships results timeline ===
Event		1997	1998	1999	2000	2001	2002	2003	2004	2005	2006	2007	2008	2009	2010	2011	2012	2013	2014	2015	2016	2017
Olympic Games	C2	Not held			1	Not held			1	Not held			1	Not held			3	Not held			—	Not held
World Championships	C2	23	Not held	15	Not held		1	3	Not held	11	3	1	Not held	1	1	1	Not held	19	17	12	Not held	10
World Championships	C2 team	—	Not held	2	Not held		6	6	Not held	—	3	3	Not held	1	4	2	Not held	2	2	6	Not held	3 (Note: Not a medal event due to low number of participating nations)
European Championships	C2	Not held	1	Not held	1	Not held	1	Not held	—	20	2	3	1	1	7	1	2	7	4	9	9	18
European Championships	C2 team	Not held	2	Not held	2	Not held	1	Not held	—	1	5	6	3	6	5	3	6	4	1	1	1	4

=== World Cup individual podiums ===
	1st place, gold medalist(s)	2nd place, silver medalist(s)	3rd place, bronze medalist(s)	Total
C2	30	11	3	44

Season	Date	Venue	Position	Event
1999	20 June 1999	Tacen	2nd	C2
1999	15 August 1999	Bratislava	1st	C2
1999	22 August 1999	Augsburg	1st	C2
1999	3 October 1999	Penrith	1st	C2
2000	9 July 2000	La Seu d'Urgell	1st	C2
2000	23 July 2000	Prague	1st	C2
2000	30 July 2000	Augsburg	2nd	C2
2001	27 May 2001	Goumois	1st	C2
2001	3 June 2001	Merano	1st	C2
2001	5 August 2001	Prague	3rd	C2
2001	9 September 2001	Wausau	1st	C2
2002	26 May 2002	Guangzhou	1st	C2
2002	20 July 2002	Augsburg	1st	C2
2002	14 September 2002	Tibagi	1st	C2
2003	6 July 2003	La Seu d'Urgell	1st	C2
2003	13 July 2003	Tacen	2nd	C2
2003	31 July 2003	Bratislava	1st	C2
2003	3 August 2003	Bratislava	1st	C2
2004	23 May 2004	La Seu d'Urgell	1st	C2
2004	30 May 2004	Merano	1st	C2
2004	11 July 2004	Prague	1st	C2
2004	25 July 2004	Bourg St.-Maurice	2nd	C2
2005	10 July 2005	Athens	2nd	C2
2005	24 July 2005	La Seu d'Urgell	1st	C2
2006	28 May 2006	Athens	1st	C2
2006	2 July 2006	L'Argentière-la-Bessée	2nd	C2^{1}
2006	5 August 2006	Prague	3rd	C2^{2}
2007	18 March 2007	Foz do Iguaçu	2nd	C2^{3}
2007	1 July 2007	Prague	1st	C2
2007	8 July 2007	Tacen	1st	C2
2007	14 July 2007	Augsburg	1st	C2
2008	16 March 2008	Penrith	2nd	C2^{4}
2008	29 June 2008	Tacen	1st	C2
2008	5 July 2008	Augsburg	1st	C2
2009	5 July 2009	Bratislava	1st	C2
2009	11 July 2009	Augsburg	2nd	C2
2010	21 February 2010	Penrith	2nd	C2^{5}
2010	19 June 2010	Prague	2nd	C2
2011	26 June 2011	Tacen	1st	C2
2011	10 July 2011	Markkleeberg	1st	C2
2012	10 June 2012	Cardiff	3rd	C2
2013	23 June 2013	Cardiff	1st	C2
2013	25 August 2013	Bratislava	1st	C2
2015	5 July 2015	Liptovský Mikuláš	1st	C2

^{1} European Championship counting for World Cup points
^{2} World Championship counting for World Cup points
^{3} Pan American Championship counting for World Cup points
^{4} Oceania Championship counting for World Cup points
^{5} Oceania Canoe Slalom Open counting for World Cup points

== Personal life ==
He lives in Čunovo, a borough of the Slovak capital Bratislava.

== See also ==
- List of multiple Summer Olympic medalists

Awards
Preceded by Michal Martikán	Sportsperson of Slovakia; 2009 with Pavol Hochschorner	Succeeded by Anastasiya Kuzmina
Preceded by Anastasiya Kuzmina	Sportsperson of Slovakia; 2011 with Pavol Hochschorner	Succeeded by Zuzana Rehák-Štefečeková
