= 2002 European Canoe Slalom Championships =

The 2002 European Canoe Slalom Championships took place in Bratislava, Slovakia between 12 and 14 July 2002 under the auspices of the European Canoe Association (ECA). It was the 4th edition of the senior championships. It was also the 1st edition of the Under 23 European Championships, which in the following years were held together with the Junior European Championships. The team events were held as an open event for both senior and U23 athletes. Countries were allowed to enter two teams in each team event. The races took place at the Čunovo Water Sports Centre on an offshoot of the Danube river.

== Medal summary ==
=== Men's results ===
==== Canoe ====
===== Senior =====
Event	Gold	Points	Silver	Points	Bronze	Points
C1	Mariusz Wieczorek (POL)	206.17	Tony Estanguet (FRA)	208.70	Jan Benzien (GER)	211.50
C1 team	Slovakia; Michal Martikán; Juraj Minčík; Alexander Slafkovský	232.77	Germany; Stefan Pfannmöller; Jan Benzien; Sören Kaufmann	237.22	Poland; Mariusz Wieczorek; Krzysztof Bieryt; Grzegorz Wójs	239.60
C2	Slovakia; Pavol Hochschorner; Peter Hochschorner	214.73	Czech Republic; Marek Jiras; Tomáš Máder	215.58	Czech Republic; Jaroslav Volf; Ondřej Štěpánek	219.27
C2 team	Slovakia; Pavol Hochschorner & Peter Hochschorner; Milan Kubáň & Marián Olejník; Pavol Hric & Roman Vajs	246.59	France; Philippe Quémerais & Yann Le Pennec; Martin Braud & Cédric Forgit; Alexandre Lauvergne & Nathanael Fouquet	250.37	Germany; Kai Walter & Frank Henze; Kay Simon & Robby Simon; André Ehrenberg & Michael Senft	256.21

===== U23 =====
Event	Gold	Points	Silver	Points	Bronze	Points
C1	Jon Ergüín (ESP)	214.54	Alexander Slafkovský (SVK)	214.67	Christian Bahmann (GER)	215.82
C2	Slovakia; Ladislav Škantár; Peter Škantár	225.14	France; Remy Gaspard; Julien Gaspard	226.21	France; Martin Braud; Cédric Forgit	227.78

==== Kayak ====
===== Senior =====
Event	Gold	Points	Silver	Points	Bronze	Points
K1	Paul Ratcliffe (GBR)	199.51	Helmut Oblinger (AUT)	200.56	Peter Cibák (SVK)	201.74
K1 team	Germany; Thomas Becker; Thomas Schmidt; Claus Suchanek	109.90	Czech Republic; Ondřej Raab; Ivan Pišvejc; Tomáš Kobes	110.80	Slovakia; Peter Cibák; Ján Šajbidor; Tomáš Mráz	112.04

===== U23 =====
Event	Gold	Points	Silver	Points	Bronze	Points
K1	Fabien Lefèvre (FRA)	204.62	Friedemann Barthel (GER)	206.56	Jan Kobes (CZE)	208.63

=== Women's results ===
==== Kayak ====
===== Senior =====
Event	Gold	Points	Silver	Points	Bronze	Points
K1	Elena Kaliská (SVK)	219.50	Irena Pavelková (CZE)	223.15	Štěpánka Hilgertová (CZE)	225.62
K1 team	Czech Republic; Marie Řihošková; Irena Pavelková; Štěpánka Hilgertová	250.89	Slovakia; Elena Kaliská; Gabriela Stacherová; Gabriela Zamišková	258.27	France; Anne-Lise Bardet; Anne-Line Poncet; Mathilde Pichery	272.16

===== U23 =====
Event	Gold	Points	Silver	Points	Bronze	Points
K1	Kateřina Hošková (CZE)	232.41	Laura Blakeman (GBR)	235.44	Aline Tornare (FRA)	236.82

== Medal tables ==
=== Senior ===
Rank	Nation	Gold	Silver	Bronze	Total
1	Slovakia (SVK)	4	1	2	7
2	Czech Republic (CZE)	1	3	2	6
3	Germany (GER)	1	1	2	4
4	Poland (POL)	1	0	1	2
5	Great Britain (GBR)	1	0	0	1
6	France (FRA)	0	2	1	3
7	Austria (AUT)	0	1	0	1
Totals (7 entries)		8	8	8	24

=== Under 23 ===
Rank	Nation	Gold	Silver	Bronze	Total
1	France (FRA)	1	1	2	4
2	Slovakia (SVK)	1	1	0	2
3	Czech Republic (CZE)	1	0	1	2
4	Spain (ESP)	1	0	0	1
5	Germany (GER)	0	1	1	2
6	Great Britain (GBR)	0	1	0	1
Totals (6 entries)		4	4	4	12

=== Total ===
Rank	Nation	Gold	Silver	Bronze	Total
1	Slovakia (SVK)	5	2	2	9
2	Czech Republic (CZE)	2	3	3	8
3	France (FRA)	1	3	3	7
4	Germany (GER)	1	2	3	6
5	Great Britain (GBR)	1	1	0	2
6	Poland (POL)	1	0	1	2
7	Spain (ESP)	1	0	0	1
8	Austria (AUT)	0	1	0	1
Totals (8 entries)		12	12	12	36
