= Mandy Planert =

German canoeist

Personal information
- Born: 26 January 1975 (age 51) Schleiz, Bezirk Gera, East Germany
- Height: 171 cm (5 ft 7 in)
- Weight: 64 kg (141 lb)

Sport
- Sport: Canoe slalom
- Club: Leipziger Kanu Club
Medal record
Representing Germany
World Championships
Gold medal – first place	1997 Três Coroas	K1 team
Gold medal – first place	1999 La Seu d'Urgell	K1 team
Gold medal – first place	2007 Foz do Igauçu	K1 team
Silver medal – second place	2002 Bourg St.-Maurice	K1
Silver medal – second place	2003 Augsburg	K1 team
Silver medal – second place	2005 Penrith	K1
European Championships
Gold medal – first place	2005 Tacen	K1
Gold medal – first place	2007 Liptovský Mikuláš	K1 team
Gold medal – first place	2008 Kraków	K1 team
Silver medal – second place	2005 Tacen	K1 team
Silver medal – second place	2007 Liptovský Mikuláš	K1
Bronze medal – third place	1998 Roudnice nad Labem	K1 team
Bronze medal – third place	2000 Mezzana	K1 team
Junior World Championships
Silver medal – second place	1992 Sjoa	K1 team

Mandy Planert (later Benzien, born 26 January 1975) is a retired German slalom canoeist who competed at the international level from 1992 to 2008.

She won six medals at the ICF Canoe Slalom World Championships with three golds (K1 team: 1997, 1999, 2007) and three silvers (K1: 2002, 2005; K1 team: 2003). She is the overall World Cup champion in K1 from 2002. She also won seven medals at the European Championships.

Planert competed in the K1 event at the 2000 and 2004 Olympics and finished 6th and 14th, respectively. She is married to the fellow Olympic canoeist Jan Benzien. They live in Leipzig together with their children Justus Jonas and Mika.

== World Cup individual podiums ==
	1st place, gold medalist(s)	2nd place, silver medalist(s)	3rd place, bronze medalist(s)	Total
K1	8	13	3	24

Season	Date	Venue	Position	Event
1999	15 August 1999	Bratislava	2nd	K1
2000	30 April 2000	Penrith	1st	K1
2000	2 July 2000	Saint-Pé-de-Bigorre	2nd	K1
2000	23 July 2000	Prague	2nd	K1
2000	30 July 2000	Augsburg	2nd	K1
2001	29 July 2001	Augsburg	2nd	K1
2001	5 August 2001	Prague	1st	K1
2001	9 September 2001	Wausau	2nd	K1
2002	26 May 2002	Guangzhou	1st	K1
2002	21 July 2002	Augsburg	3rd	K1
2002	4 August 2002	Prague	2nd	K1
2002	14 September 2002	Tibagi	1st	K1
2004	23 April 2004	Athens	2nd	K1
2004	23 May 2004	La Seu d'Urgell	3rd	K1
2004	30 May 2004	Merano	2nd	K1
2004	11 July 2004	Prague	2nd	K1
2004	18 July 2004	Augsburg	2nd	K1
2005	26 June 2005	Tacen	1st	K1^{1}
2005	9 Jule 2005	Athens	3rd	K1
2005	17 Jule 2005	Augsburg	1st	K1
2005	1 October 2005	Penrith	2nd	K1^{2}
2007	8 July 2007	Tacen	1st	K1
2008	21 June 2008	Prague	2nd	K1
2008	29 June 2008	Tacen	1st	K1

^{1} European Championship counting for World Cup points
^{2} World Championship counting for World Cup points
