= Miha Terdič =

Slovenian slalom canoeist (born 1980)

Medal record

Men's canoe slalom

Representing Slovenia

World Championships
Silver medal – second place	2002 Bourg St.-Maurice	K1

European Championships
Silver medal – second place	2000 Mezzana	K1 team

Junior World Championships
Gold medal – first place	1998 Lofer	K1
Bronze medal – third place	1996 Lipno	K1 team

Junior European Championships
Bronze medal – third place	1997 Nowy Sącz	K1 team

Miha Terdič (born 1980) is a Slovenian slalom canoeist who competed at the international level from 1995 to 2003.

He won a silver medal in the K1 event at the 2002 ICF Canoe Slalom World Championships in Bourg-Saint-Maurice. He also won a silver medal in the K1 team event at the 2000 European Championships in Mezzana.

== World Cup individual podiums ==
Season	Date	Venue	Position	Event
2002	28 Jul 2002	Tacen	1st	K1
