= Pavol Hochschorner =

Slovak slalom canoeist (born 1979)

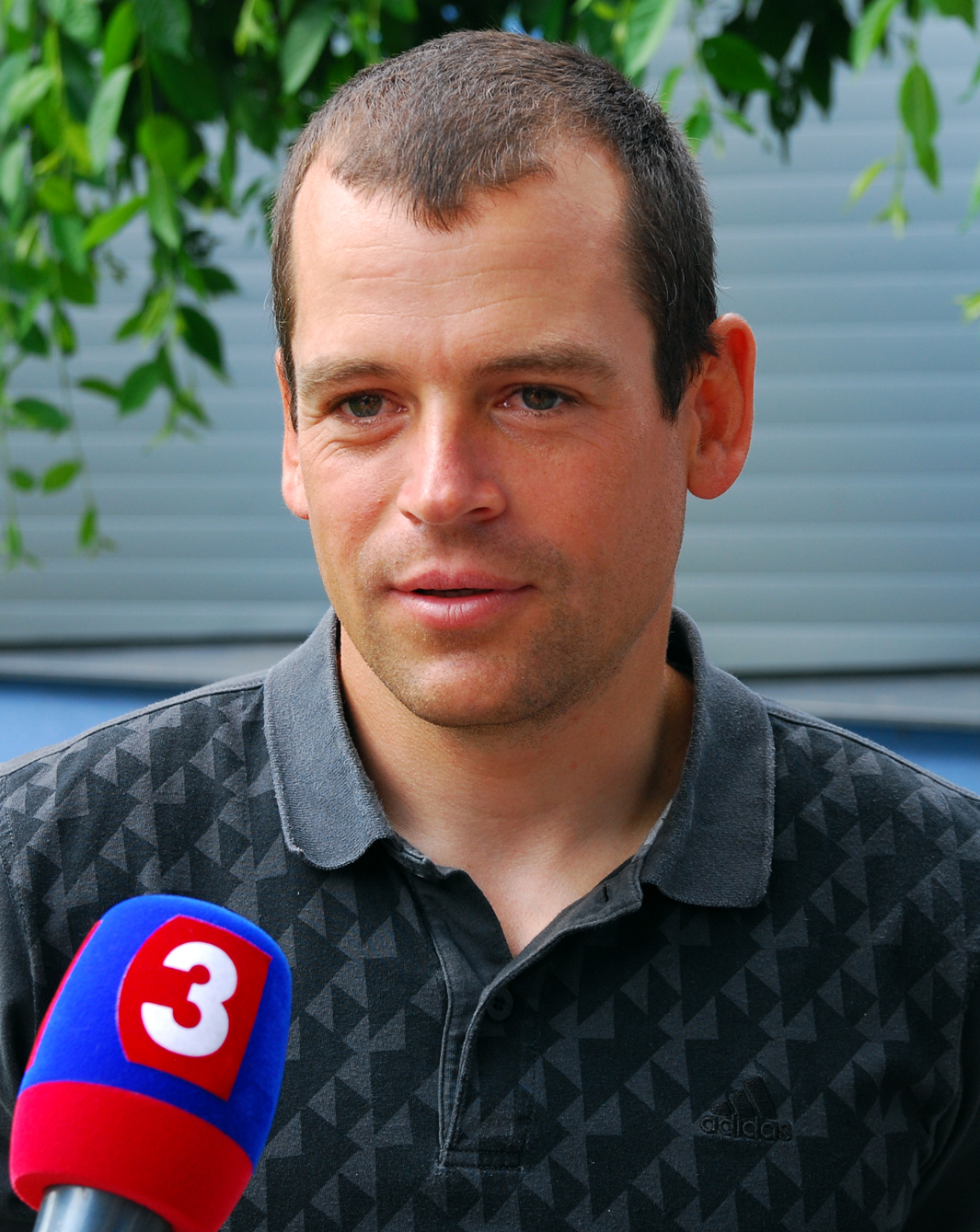
- Hochschorner in 2011

Personal information
- Nationality: Slovak
- Born: 7 September 1979 (age 46) Bratislava, Czechoslovakia
- Years active: 1996 - 2021
- Height: 1.75 m (5 ft 9 in)
- Weight: 74 kg (163 lb)

Sport
- Country: Slovakia
- Sport: Canoe slalom, Wildwater canoeing
- Event: C2
- Club: ŠKP Bratislava
- Coached by: Peter Hochschorner Sr.
- Retired: 2021
Medal record
Men's canoe slalom
| Event | 1st | 2nd | 3rd |
|---|---|---|---|
| Olympic Games | 3 | 0 | 1 |
| World Championships | 6 | 4 | 4 |
| European Championships | 11 | 3 | 3 |
| Junior European Championships | 0 | 1 | 0 |
| Total | 20 | 8 | 8 |
Representing Slovakia
Olympic Games
| Gold medal – first place | 2000 Sydney | C2 |
| Gold medal – first place | 2004 Athens | C2 |
| Gold medal – first place | 2008 Beijing | C2 |
| Bronze medal – third place | 2012 London | C2 |
World Championships
| Gold medal – first place | 2002 Bourg St.-Maurice | C2 |
| Gold medal – first place | 2007 Foz do Iguaçu | C2 |
| Gold medal – first place | 2009 La Seu d'Urgell | C2 |
| Gold medal – first place | 2009 La Seu d'Urgell | C2 team |
| Gold medal – first place | 2010 Tacen | C2 |
| Gold medal – first place | 2011 Bratislava | C2 |
| Silver medal – second place | 1999 La Seu d'Urgell | C2 team |
| Silver medal – second place | 2011 Bratislava | C2 team |
| Silver medal – second place | 2013 Prague | C2 team |
| Silver medal – second place | 2014 Deep Creek Lake | C2 team |
| Bronze medal – third place | 2003 Augsburg | C2 |
| Bronze medal – third place | 2006 Prague | C2 |
| Bronze medal – third place | 2006 Prague | C2 team |
| Bronze medal – third place | 2007 Foz do Iguaçu | C2 team |
European Championships
| Gold medal – first place | 1998 Roudnice nad Labem | C2 |
| Gold medal – first place | 2000 Mezzana | C2 |
| Gold medal – first place | 2002 Bratislava | C2 |
| Gold medal – first place | 2002 Bratislava | C2 team |
| Gold medal – first place | 2005 Tacen | C2 team |
| Gold medal – first place | 2008 Kraków | C2 |
| Gold medal – first place | 2009 Nottingham | C2 |
| Gold medal – first place | 2011 La Seu d'Urgell | C2 |
| Gold medal – first place | 2014 Vienna | C2 team |
| Gold medal – first place | 2015 Markkleeberg | C2 team |
| Gold medal – first place | 2016 Liptovský Mikuláš | C2 team |
| Silver medal – second place | 1998 Roudnice nad Labem | C2 team |
| Silver medal – second place | 2006 L'Argentière-la-Bessée | C2 |
| Silver medal – second place | 2012 Augsburg | C2 |
| Bronze medal – third place | 2007 Liptovský Mikuláš | C2 |
| Bronze medal – third place | 2008 Kraków | C2 team |
| Bronze medal – third place | 2011 La Seu d'Urgell | C2 team |
Junior European Championships
| Silver medal – second place | 1997 Nowy Sącz | C2 |

Pavol Hochschorner (born 7 September 1979) is a retired Slovak slalom canoeist who competed at the international level from 1996 to 2017. Competing together with his twin brother Peter Hochschorner, they are the most successful C2 paddlers in the history of canoe slalom. They retired from canoe slalom in 2018 after the C2 event was discontinued and subsequently switched to wildwater canoeing. They retired from wildwater canoeing after the 2021 World Championships in their hometown Bratislava.

Hochschorner won three Olympic gold medals in the C2 event, in 2000, 2004 and 2008 and one bronze medal in 2012.

He also won fourteen medals at the ICF Canoe Slalom World Championships with six golds (C2: 2002, 2007, 2009, 2010, 2011; C2 team: 2009), four silvers (C2 team: 1999, 2011, 2013, 2014) and four bronzes (C2: 2003, 2006; C2 team: 2006, 2007).

Hochschorner won the overall World Cup title 10 times (1999–2004, 2006–2008 and 2011) with his twin brother, which is a record in any category.

At the European Championships he won a total of 17 medals (11 golds, 3 silvers and 3 bronzes).

== Career ==
The Hochschorner twins made their first appearance on the international stage at the 1996 World Junior Canoe Slalom Championships where they finished in 15th position in the C2 event and 5th in the C2 team event. One year later they won a silver medal in the C2 event at the 1997 European Junior Canoe Slalom Championships. That year they also made their debut at the senior World Championships, finishing in 23rd position.

They won their first senior medals at the 1998 European Championships, where they won the individual event and took silver in the team event. The following year brought even more success as they won 3 out of 5 World Cup races as well as the overall title. They also earned their first World Championship medal, a silver in the team event.

The Hochschorners defended their overall World Cup title in 2000 and came to the 2000 Summer Olympics in Sydney as favorites. They won the two-run qualifying round to advance to the final. In the first run of the final they took a 2 second penalty which relegated them to the 2nd place behind defending champions Frank Adisson/Wilfrid Forgues. They then produced the fastest time of the day on the second run to clinch their first Olympic gold.

In 2002 they won their first World Championship gold in Bourg Saint Maurice, winning the individual C2 event. They continued to dominate the World Cup scene by winning the overall title 6 years in a row between 1999 and 2004. Thus they came to the 2004 Summer Olympics in Athens not only as defending champion, but also as overwhelming favorites. They were able to defend their title after posting the fastest times in both qualifying runs as well as the semifinal and then maintaining their advantage in the final.

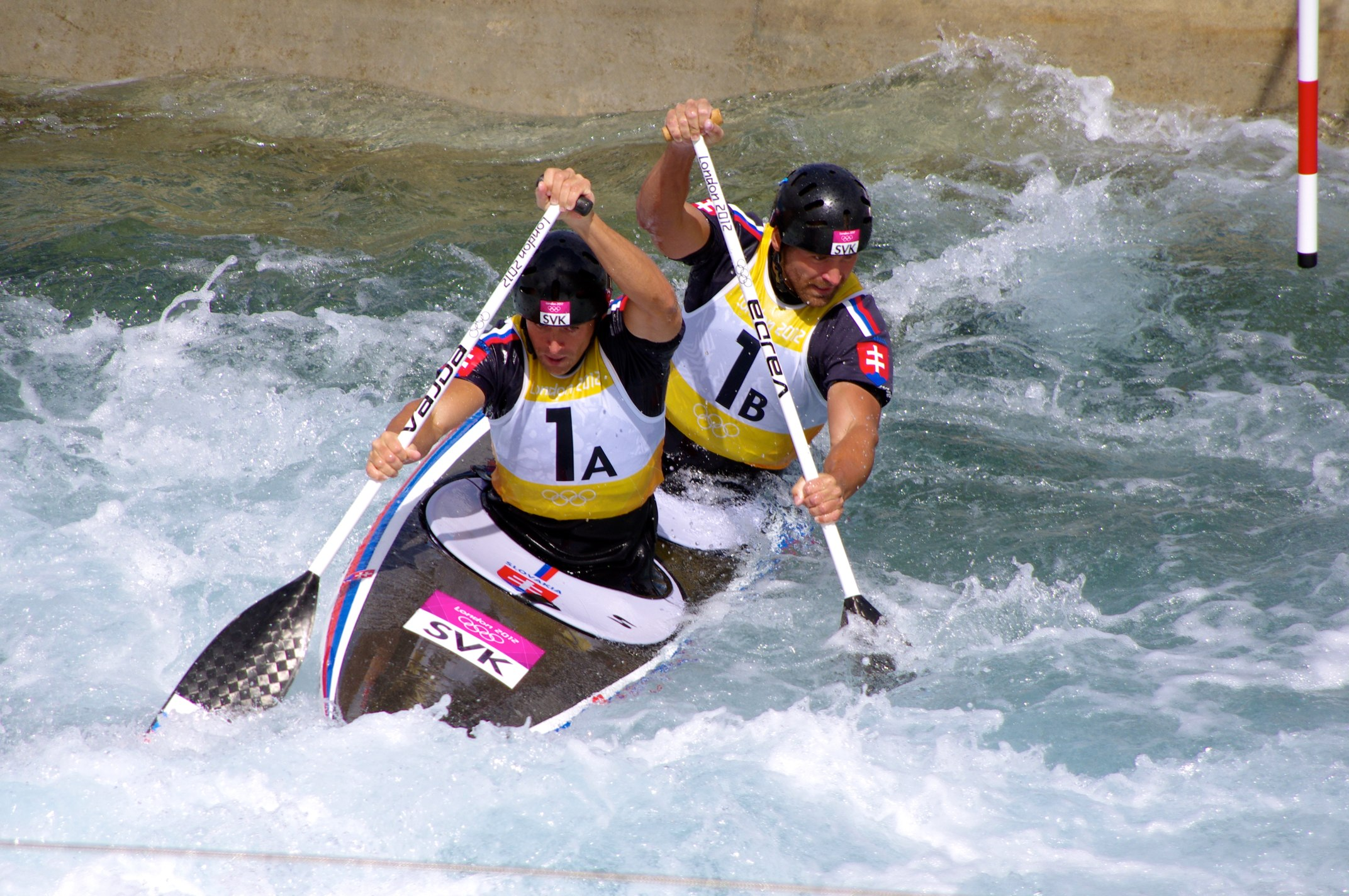
The Hochschorner brothers (Pavol in front) at the 2012 Summer Olympics

They had to wait until 2007 to win their second world title in Foz do Iguaçu. They completed their golden Olympic hattrick at the 2008 Summer Olympics in Beijing. Once again they won the qualification, then finished 2nd in the semifinal run, but were able to move up to 1st position with their run in the final. This was followed by another 3 gold medals at the World Championships between 2009 and 2011, which meant they went unbeaten in 5 straight global championships between 2007 and 2011.

Their unbeaten streak ended at the 2012 Summer Olympics in London, where they were beaten by both British boats, but still came away with a bronze medal. This would be their last major individual medal, not just at the Olympics. Their individual medal count also includes 5 golds and 2 bronzes from World Championships and 6 golds, 2 silvers and 1 bronze from the European Championships.

They missed the 2016 Summer Olympics after losing the internal qualification battle to eventual champions Ladislav Škantár and Peter Škantár.

They finished their career holding several all-time records in the sport of canoe slalom including most Olympic golds (3), most World Cup titles (10), and most World Cup victories (30). The last two records have been broken by Jessica Fox.

== Career statistics ==
=== Major championships results timeline ===
| Event | | 1997 | 1998 | 1999 | 2000 | 2001 | 2002 | 2003 | 2004 | 2005 | 2006 | 2007 | 2008 | 2009 | 2010 | 2011 | 2012 | 2013 | 2014 | 2015 | 2016 | 2017 |
|---|---|---|---|---|---|---|---|---|---|---|---|---|---|---|---|---|---|---|---|---|---|---|
| Olympic Games | C2 | Not held | | | 1 | Not held | | | 1 | Not held | | | 1 | Not held | | | 3 | Not held | | | — | Not held |
| World Championships | C2 | 23 | Not held | 15 | Not held | | 1 | 3 | Not held | 11 | 3 | 1 | Not held | 1 | 1 | 1 | Not held | 19 | 17 | 12 | Not held | 10 |
| World Championships | C2 team | — | Not held | 2 | Not held | | 6 | 6 | Not held | — | 3 | 3 | Not held | 1 | 4 | 2 | Not held | 2 | 2 | 6 | Not held | 3 (Note: Not a medal event due to low number of participating nations) |
| European Championships | C2 | Not held | 1 | Not held | 1 | Not held | 1 | Not held | — | 20 | 2 | 3 | 1 | 1 | 7 | 1 | 2 | 7 | 4 | 9 | 9 | 18 |
| European Championships | C2 team | Not held | 2 | Not held | 2 | Not held | 1 | Not held | — | 1 | 5 | 6 | 3 | 6 | 5 | 3 | 6 | 4 | 1 | 1 | 1 | 4 |

=== World Cup individual podiums ===
| | 1st place, gold medalist(s) | 2nd place, silver medalist(s) | 3rd place, bronze medalist(s) | Total |
| C2 | 30 | 11 | 3 | 44 |

| Season | Date | Venue | Position | Event |
|---|---|---|---|---|
| 1999 | 20 June 1999 | Tacen | 2nd | C2 |
| 1999 | 15 August 1999 | Bratislava | 1st | C2 |
| 1999 | 22 August 1999 | Augsburg | 1st | C2 |
| 1999 | 3 October 1999 | Penrith | 1st | C2 |
| 2000 | 9 July 2000 | La Seu d'Urgell | 1st | C2 |
| 2000 | 23 July 2000 | Prague | 1st | C2 |
| 2000 | 30 July 2000 | Augsburg | 2nd | C2 |
| 2001 | 27 May 2001 | Goumois | 1st | C2 |
| 2001 | 3 June 2001 | Merano | 1st | C2 |
| 2001 | 5 August 2001 | Prague | 3rd | C2 |
| 2001 | 9 September 2001 | Wausau | 1st | C2 |
| 2002 | 26 May 2002 | Guangzhou | 1st | C2 |
| 2002 | 20 July 2002 | Augsburg | 1st | C2 |
| 2002 | 14 September 2002 | Tibagi | 1st | C2 |
| 2003 | 6 July 2003 | La Seu d'Urgell | 1st | C2 |
| 2003 | 13 July 2003 | Tacen | 2nd | C2 |
| 2003 | 31 July 2003 | Bratislava | 1st | C2 |
| 2003 | 3 August 2003 | Bratislava | 1st | C2 |
| 2004 | 23 May 2004 | La Seu d'Urgell | 1st | C2 |
| 2004 | 30 May 2004 | Merano | 1st | C2 |
| 2004 | 11 July 2004 | Prague | 1st | C2 |
| 2004 | 25 July 2004 | Bourg St.-Maurice | 2nd | C2 |
| 2005 | 10 July 2005 | Athens | 2nd | C2 |
| 2005 | 24 July 2005 | La Seu d'Urgell | 1st | C2 |
| 2006 | 28 May 2006 | Athens | 1st | C2 |
| 2006 | 2 July 2006 | L'Argentière-la-Bessée | 2nd | C2^{1} |
| 2006 | 5 August 2006 | Prague | 3rd | C2^{2} |
| 2007 | 18 March 2007 | Foz do Iguaçu | 2nd | C2^{3} |
| 2007 | 1 July 2007 | Prague | 1st | C2 |
| 2007 | 8 July 2007 | Tacen | 1st | C2 |
| 2007 | 14 July 2007 | Augsburg | 1st | C2 |
| 2008 | 16 March 2008 | Penrith | 2nd | C2^{4} |
| 2008 | 29 June 2008 | Tacen | 1st | C2 |
| 2008 | 5 July 2008 | Augsburg | 1st | C2 |
| 2009 | 5 July 2009 | Bratislava | 1st | C2 |
| 2009 | 11 July 2009 | Augsburg | 2nd | C2 |
| 2010 | 21 February 2010 | Penrith | 2nd | C2^{5} |
| 2010 | 19 June 2010 | Prague | 2nd | C2 |
| 2011 | 26 June 2011 | Tacen | 1st | C2 |
| 2011 | 10 July 2011 | Markkleeberg | 1st | C2 |
| 2012 | 10 June 2012 | Cardiff | 3rd | C2 |
| 2013 | 23 June 2013 | Cardiff | 1st | C2 |
| 2013 | 25 August 2013 | Bratislava | 1st | C2 |
| 2015 | 5 July 2015 | Liptovský Mikuláš | 1st | C2 |

^{1} European Championship counting for World Cup points
^{2} World Championship counting for World Cup points
^{3} Pan American Championship counting for World Cup points
^{4} Oceania Championship counting for World Cup points
^{5} Oceania Canoe Slalom Open counting for World Cup points

== Personal life ==
He lives in Čunovo, a borough of the Slovak capital Bratislava.

== See also ==
- List of multiple Summer Olympic medalists

Awards
| Preceded by Michal Martikán | Sportsperson of Slovakia; 2009 with Peter Hochschorner | Succeeded by Anastasiya Kuzmina |
| Preceded by Anastasiya Kuzmina | Sportsperson of Slovakia; 2011 with Peter Hochschorner | Succeeded by Zuzana Rehák-Štefečeková |
