= Jordi Sangrá =

Spanish canoeist

Medal record

Men's canoe slalom

Representing Spain

European Championships
Bronze medal – third place	2000 Mezzana	C-1 team

Jordi Sangrá Gibert (born 27 July 1980 in Ponts) is a Spanish slalom canoeist who competed from the mid-1990s to the late 2000s.

He won a bronze medal in the C-1 team event at the 2000 European Championships in Mezzana. He also finished seventh in the C-1 event at the 2004 Summer Olympics in Athens.
