= 2002 Canoe Slalom World Cup =

The 2002 Canoe Slalom World Cup was a series of five races in 4 canoeing and kayaking categories organized by the International Canoe Federation (ICF). It was the 15th edition. The series consisted of 4 regular world cup races and the world cup final.

== Calendar ==
| Label | Venue | Date |
|---|---|---|
| World Cup Race 1 | (China) Guangzhou | 25–26 May |
| World Cup Race 2 | (Germany) Augsburg | 19–21 July |
| World Cup Race 3 | (Slovenia) Tacen | 27–28 July |
| World Cup Race 4 | (Czech Republic) Prague | 3–4 August |
| World Cup Final | (Brazil) Tibagi | 13–15 September |

== Final standings ==
The winner of each world cup race was awarded 30 points. Semifinalists were guaranteed at least 5 points and paddlers eliminated in heats received 2 points each. The world cup final points scale was multiplied by a factor of 1.5. That meant the winner of the world cup final earned 45 points, semifinalists got at least 7.5 points and paddlers eliminated in heats received 3 points apiece. Only the best four results of each athlete counted for the final world cup standings.

=== C1 men ===
| Pos | Athlete | Points |
|---|---|---|
| 1 | Stefan Pfannmöller (GER) | 106 |
| 2 | Stanislav Ježek (CZE) | 91.5 |
| 3 | Justin Boocock (AUS) | 79 |
| 4 | Juraj Minčík (SVK) | 76.5 |
| 5 | Michal Martikán (SVK) | 71 |
| 6 | Patrice Estanguet (FRA) | 55 |
| 7 | Eric Deguil (FRA) | 47.5 |
| 8 | Cássio Petry (BRA) | 42 |
| 9 | Tony Estanguet (FRA) | 40 |
| 10 | Jan Benzien (GER) | 39 |

=== C2 men ===
| Pos | Athletes | Points |
|---|---|---|
| 1 | Pavol Hochschorner/Peter Hochschorner (SVK) | 123 |
| 2 | Kai Walter/Frank Henze (GER) | 96 |
| 3 | Milan Kubáň/Marián Olejník (SVK) | 84 |
| 4 | André Ehrenberg/Michael Senft (GER) | 72 |
| 5 | Pavol Hric/Roman Vajs (SVK) | 70 |
| 6 | Philippe Quémerais/Yann Le Pennec (FRA) | 63.5 |
| 7 | Jaroslav Volf/Ondřej Štěpánek (CZE) | 60 |
| 8 | Cédric Forgit/Martin Braud (FRA) | 51.5 |
| 9 | Kay Simon/Robby Simon (GER) | 48 |
| 9 | Marek Jiras/Tomáš Máder (CZE) | 48 |

=== K1 men ===
| Pos | Athlete | Points |
|---|---|---|
| 1 | Fabien Lefèvre (FRA) | 110.5 |
| 2 | David Ford (CAN) | 91 |
| 3 | Benoît Peschier (FRA) | 88.5 |
| 4 | Michael Kurt (SUI) | 71 |
| 4 | Helmut Oblinger (AUT) | 71 |
| 6 | Miha Terdič (SLO) | 69.5 |
| 7 | Anthony Brown (GBR) | 51 |
| 8 | Thomas Schmidt (GER) | 50 |
| 9 | Ivan Pišvejc (CZE) | 49 |
| 10 | Thomas Becker (GER) | 48 |

=== K1 women ===
| Pos | Athlete | Points |
|---|---|---|
| 1 | Mandy Planert (GER) | 120 |
| 2 | Irena Pavelková (CZE) | 111.5 |
| 3 | Elena Kaliská (SVK) | 83 |
| 3 | Gabriela Stacherová (SVK) | 83 |
| 5 | Violetta Oblinger-Peters (AUT) | 71.5 |
| 6 | Mathilde Pichery (FRA) | 56.5 |
| 7 | Rebecca Giddens (USA) | 48 |
| 8 | Anne-Lise Bardet (FRA) | 43 |
| 9 | Marcela Sadilová (CZE) | 41 |
| 10 | Jana Dukátová (SVK) | 38 |

== Results ==
=== World Cup Race 1 ===
The first world cup race of the season took place in Guangzhou, China from 25 to 26 May.

| Event | Gold | Score | Silver | Score | Bronze | Score |
|---|---|---|---|---|---|---|
| C1 men | Tony Estanguet (FRA) | 198.69 | Patrice Estanguet (FRA) | 199.22 | Justin Boocock (AUS) | 202.39 |
| C2 men | Slovakia; Pavol Hochschorner; Peter Hochschorner | 204.82 | Germany; Kai Walter; Frank Henze | 209.53 | Germany; André Ehrenberg; Michael Senft | 215.34 |
| K1 men | Helmut Oblinger (AUT) | 192.81 | Benoît Peschier (FRA) | 194.57 | David Ford (CAN) | 194.87 |
| K1 women | Mandy Planert (GER) | 212.77 | Gabriela Stacherová (SVK) | 215.53 | Anne-Line Poncet (FRA) | 215.62 |

=== World Cup Race 2 ===
The second world cup race of the season took place at the Augsburg Eiskanal, Germany from 19 to 21 July.

| Event | Gold | Score | Silver | Score | Bronze | Score |
|---|---|---|---|---|---|---|
| C1 men | Nico Bettge (GER) | 188.11 | Stefan Pfannmöller (GER) | 189.75 | Michal Martikán (SVK) | 190.60 |
| C2 men | Slovakia; Pavol Hochschorner; Peter Hochschorner | 200.98 | Germany; Kai Walter; Frank Henze | 202.64 | Germany; Kay Simon; Robby Simon | 203.62 |
| K1 men | Fabien Lefèvre (FRA) | 180.69 | Thomas Schmidt (GER) | 181.54 | Claus Suchanek (GER) | 182.00 |
| K1 women | Irena Pavelková (CZE) | 200.56 | Elena Kaliská (SVK) | 200.99 | Mandy Planert (GER) | 201.10 |

=== World Cup Race 3 ===
The third world cup race of the season took place at the Tacen Whitewater Course, Slovenia from 27 to 28 July.

| Event | Gold | Score | Silver | Score | Bronze | Score |
|---|---|---|---|---|---|---|
| C1 men | Michal Martikán (SVK) | 188.07 | Stanislav Ježek (CZE) | 192.01 | Juraj Minčík (SVK) | 192.66 |
| C2 men | Slovakia; Pavol Hric; Roman Vajs | 201.41 | Slovakia; Milan Kubáň; Marián Olejník | 201.61 | Germany; André Ehrenberg; Michael Senft | 204.23 |
| K1 men | Miha Terdič (SLO) | 181.79 | Thomas Becker (GER) | 182.36 | David Ford (CAN) | 184.46 |
| K1 women | Irena Pavelková (CZE) | 202.63 | Violetta Oblinger-Peters (AUT) | 210.91 | Marcela Sadilová (CZE) | 213.55 |

=== World Cup Race 4 ===
The fourth world cup race of the season took place at the Prague-Troja Canoeing Centre, Czech Republic from 3 to 4 August.

| Event | Gold | Score | Silver | Score | Bronze | Score |
|---|---|---|---|---|---|---|
| C1 men | Krzysztof Bieryt (POL) | 194.55 | Patrice Estanguet (FRA) | 195.28 | Stanislav Ježek (CZE) | 195.86 |
| C2 men | Czech Republic; Jaroslav Volf; Ondřej Štěpánek | 203.85 | Czech Republic; Jaroslav Pospíšil; Jaroslav Pollert | 205.74 | Czech Republic; Marek Jiras; Tomáš Máder | 206.21 |
| K1 men | Fabien Lefèvre (FRA) | 187.49 | Thomas Schmidt (GER) | 188.36 | Benoît Peschier (FRA) | 188.96 |
| K1 women | Rebecca Giddens (USA) | 205.57 | Mandy Planert (GER) | 205.71 | Štěpánka Hilgertová (CZE) | 207.16 |

=== World Cup Final ===
The final world cup race of the season took place in Tibagi, Brazil from 13 to 15 September.

| Event | Gold | Score | Silver | Score | Bronze | Score |
|---|---|---|---|---|---|---|
| C1 men | Stefan Pfannmöller (GER) | 219.89 | Stanislav Ježek (CZE) | 221.91 | Justin Boocock (AUS) | 223.19 |
| C2 men | Slovakia; Pavol Hochschorner; Peter Hochschorner | 266.71 | France; Philippe Quémerais; Yann Le Pennec | 270.92 | Germany; Kai Walter; Frank Henze | 275.25 |
| K1 men | David Ford (CAN) | 197.85 | Fabien Lefèvre (FRA) | 197.97 | Anthony Brown (GBR) | 199.76 |
| K1 women | Mandy Planert (GER) | 275.78 | Irena Pavelková (CZE) | 277.48 | Elena Kaliská (SVK) | 280.92 |
