= Jurij Korenjak =

Slovenian canoeist

Medal record

Men's canoe slalom

Representing Slovenia

World Championships
| Bronze medal – third place | 2002 Bourg St.-Maurice | C-1 team |

Jurij Korenjak is a Slovenian slalom canoeist who competed from the mid-1990s to the mid-2000s. He won a bronze medal in the C-1 team event at the 2002 ICF Canoe Slalom World Championships in Bourg St.-Maurice.
