= Thomas Schmidt (canoeist) =

German slalom canoeist

Medal record

Men's canoe slalom

Representing Germany

Olympic Games
Gold medal – first place	2000 Sydney	K1

World Championships
Gold medal – first place	2002 Bourg St.-Maurice	K1 team
Bronze medal – third place	2003 Augsburg	K1 team

European Championships
Gold medal – first place	1996 Augsburg	K1 team
Gold medal – first place	1998 Roudnice nad Labem	K1 team
Gold medal – first place	2002 Bratislava	K1 team

Junior World Championships
Bronze medal – third place	1994 Wausau	K1 team

Thomas Schmidt (born 18 February 1976) is a German slalom canoeist who competed at the international level from 1994 to 2004.

Competing in two Summer Olympics, he won a gold medal in the K1 event in Sydney in 2000. Schmidt also won two medals in the K1 team event at the ICF Canoe Slalom World Championships with a gold in 2002 and a bronze in 2003.

He is the overall World Cup champion in K1 from 2001. He also won three gold medals in the K1 team event at the European Championships.

== World Cup individual podiums ==
	1st place, gold medalist(s)	2nd place, silver medalist(s)	3rd place, bronze medalist(s)	Total
K1	3	5	3	11

Season	Date	Venue	Position	Event
1998	13 September 1998	La Seu d'Urgell	3rd	K1
2000	2 July 2000	Saint-Pé-de-Bigorre	3rd	K1
2000	30 July 2000	Augsburg	2nd	K1
2001	28 July 2001	Augsburg	1st	K1
2001	5 August 2001	Prague	2nd	K1
2001	9 September 2001	Wausau	1st	K1
2002	20 July 2002	Augsburg	2nd	K1
2002	4 August 2002	Prague	2nd	K1
2003	31 July 2003	Bratislava	2nd	K1
2004	30 May 2004	Merano	3rd	K1
2004	17 July 2004	Augsburg	1st	K1
