= Laurent Burtz =

French slalom canoeist

Medal record

Men's canoe slalom

Representing France

European Championships
| Bronze medal – third place | 2000 Mezzana | K1 |

Laurent Burtz (born 25 April 1973 in Bourgoin-Jallieu) is a French slalom canoeist who competed from the mid-1990s to the early 2000s (decade).

He won a bronze medal in the K1 event at the 2000 European Championships in Mezzana. Competing in two Summer Olympics, he earned his best finish of fourth in the K1 event in Atlanta in 1996.

== World Cup individual podiums ==
| Season | Date | Venue | Position | Event |
|---|---|---|---|---|
| 2001 | 27 May 2001 | Goumois | 2nd | K1 |
| 2001 | 3 Jun 2001 | Merano | 3rd | K1 |
