= Stanislav Ježek =

Czech slalom canoeist (born 1976)

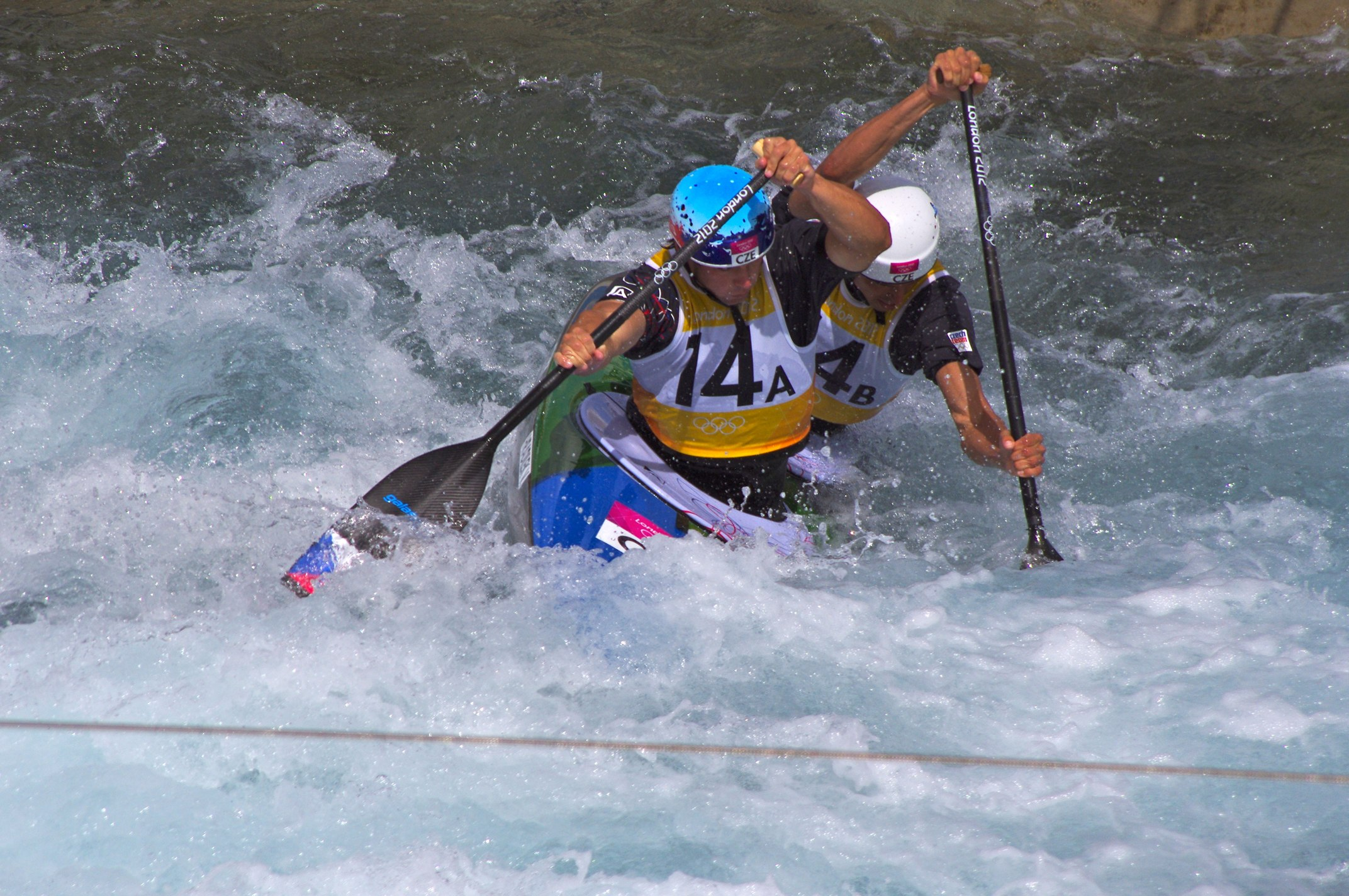
- Vavřinec Hradilek (14A) and Stanislav Ježek (14B)

Personal information
- Born: 21 November 1976 (age 49) Prague
- Height: 185 cm (6 ft 1 in)
- Weight: 69 kg (152 lb)

Sport
- Club: USK Praha
- Coached by: Jiří Rohan
Medal record
Men's canoe slalom
Representing Czech Republic
World Championships
Gold medal – first place	2002 Bourg St.-Maurice	C1 team
Silver medal – second place	2006 Prague	C1 team
Bronze medal – third place	2003 Augsburg	C1 team
Bronze medal – third place	2005 Penrith	C1 team
Bronze medal – third place	2006 Prague	C1
Bronze medal – third place	2007 Foz do Iguaçu	C1 team
Bronze medal – third place	2010 Tacen	C1 team
Bronze medal – third place	2011 Bratislava	C1 team
European Championships
Gold medal – first place	2009 Nottingham	C1 team
Silver medal – second place	2008 Kraków	C1
Silver medal – second place	2010 Bratislava	C1 team
Silver medal – second place	2015 Markkleeberg	C1 team
Bronze medal – third place	2005 Tacen	C1 team
Bronze medal – third place	2006 L'Argentière-la-Bessée	C1 team
Bronze medal – third place	2011 La Seu d'Urgell	C1 team
Junior World Championships
Gold medal – first place	1994 Wausau	C1 team

Stanislav Ježek (Czech pronunciation: [ˈstaɲɪslaf ˈjɛʒɛk]; born 21 November 1976 in Prague) is a Czech slalom canoeist who has competed at the international level since 1994.

He won eight medals at the ICF Canoe Slalom World Championships with a gold (C1 team: 2002), a silver (C1 team: 2006), and six bronzes (C1: 2006, C1 team: 2003, 2005, 2007, 2010, 2011).

He is the overall World Cup champion in C1 from 1999 and 2011. He also won a total of 7 medals at the European Championships (1 gold, 3 silvers and 3 bronzes).

Ježek also competed at the 2008 Summer Olympics in Beijing. In the C1 event, he finished fourth in the qualification round, thus progressing to the semifinals. In the semifinals he finished second, managing to reach the top eight and the final round. In the final he finished fifth. At the 2012 Summer Olympics in London, he repeated his 5th position in the C1 event. He also started in the C2 event with Vavřinec Hradilek where they finished 9th after being eliminated in the semifinals.

Ježek is the nominated Dartfish representative for the Czech Republic and Slovakia.

== World Cup individual podiums ==
	1st place, gold medalist(s)	2nd place, silver medalist(s)	3rd place, bronze medalist(s)	Total
C1	6	4	6	16

Season	Date	Venue	Position	Event
1998	28 June 1998	Augsburg	1st	C1
1999	15 August 1999	Bratislava	2nd	C1
1999	22 August 1999	Augsburg	3rd	C1
1999	3 October 1999	Penrith	1st	C1
2002	28 July 2002	Tacen	2nd	C1
2002	4 August 2002	Prague	3rd	C1
2002	15 September 2002	Tibagi	2nd	C1
2005	9 July 2005	Athens	3rd	C1
2006	6 August 2006	Prague	3rd	C1^{1}
2007	30 June 2007	Prague	1st	C1
2010	27 June 2010	La Seu d'Urgell	1st	C1
2011	25 June 2011	Tacen	2nd	C1
2011	2 July 2011	L'Argentière-la-Bessée	3rd	C1
2013	22 June 2013	Cardiff	1st	C1
2015	20 June 2015	Prague	1st	C1
2015	4 July 2015	Liptovský Mikuláš	3rd	C1

^{1} World Championship counting for World Cup points
