= Stefan Pfannmöller =

German canoeist (born 1980)

Medal record

Men's canoe slalom

Representing Germany

Olympic Games
Bronze medal – third place	2004 Athens	C1

World Championships
Gold medal – first place	2006 Prague	C1 team
Silver medal – second place	1999 La Seu d'Urgell	C1 team
Silver medal – second place	2002 Bourg St.-Maurice	C1 team
Silver medal – second place	2005 Penrith	C1 team
Bronze medal – third place	2003 Augsburg	C1

European Championships
Gold medal – first place	2005 Tacen	C1
Gold medal – first place	2006 L'Argentière-la-Bessée	C1 team
Silver medal – second place	1998 Roudnice nad Labem	C1 team
Silver medal – second place	2002 Bratislava	C1 team
Silver medal – second place	2005 Tacen	C1 team
Silver medal – second place	2007 Liptovský Mikuláš	C1 team

Junior World Championships
Gold medal – first place	1998 Lofer	C1 team

Junior European Championships
Silver medal – second place	1997 Nowy Sącz	C1 team

Stefan Pfannmöller (born 4 December 1980, in Halle an der Saale) is a German slalom canoeist who competed at the international level from 1997 to 2007. Competing in two Summer Olympics, he won a bronze medal in the C1 event in Athens in 2004.

Pfannmöller also won five medals at the ICF Canoe Slalom World Championships with a gold (C1 team: 2006), three silvers (C1 team: 1999, 2002, 2005), and a bronze (C1: 2003).

He is the overall World Cup champion in the C1 class from 2002. At the European Championships he won a total of six medals (2 golds and 4 silvers).

== World Cup individual podiums ==
	1st place, gold medalist(s)	2nd place, silver medalist(s)	3rd place, bronze medalist(s)	Total
C1	4	5	3	12

Season	Date	Venue	Position	Event
2001	3 June 2001	Merano	3rd	C1
2001	9 September 2001	Wausau	2nd	C1
2002	21 July 2002	Augsburg	2nd	C1
2002	15 September 2002	Tibagi	1st	C1
2003	6 July 2003	La Seu d'Urgell	2nd	C1
2003	31 July 2003	Bratislava	2nd	C1
2003	3 August 2003	Bratislava	3rd	C1
2004	23 April 2004	Athens	3rd	C1
2004	23 May 2004	La Seu d'Urgell	2nd	C1
2004	30 May 2004	Merano	1st	C1
2004	18 July 2004	Augsburg	1st	C1
2005	26 June 2005	Tacen	1st	C1^{1}

^{1} European Championship counting for World Cup points
