= Štěpánka Hilgertová =

Czechoslovak-Czech slalom canoeist

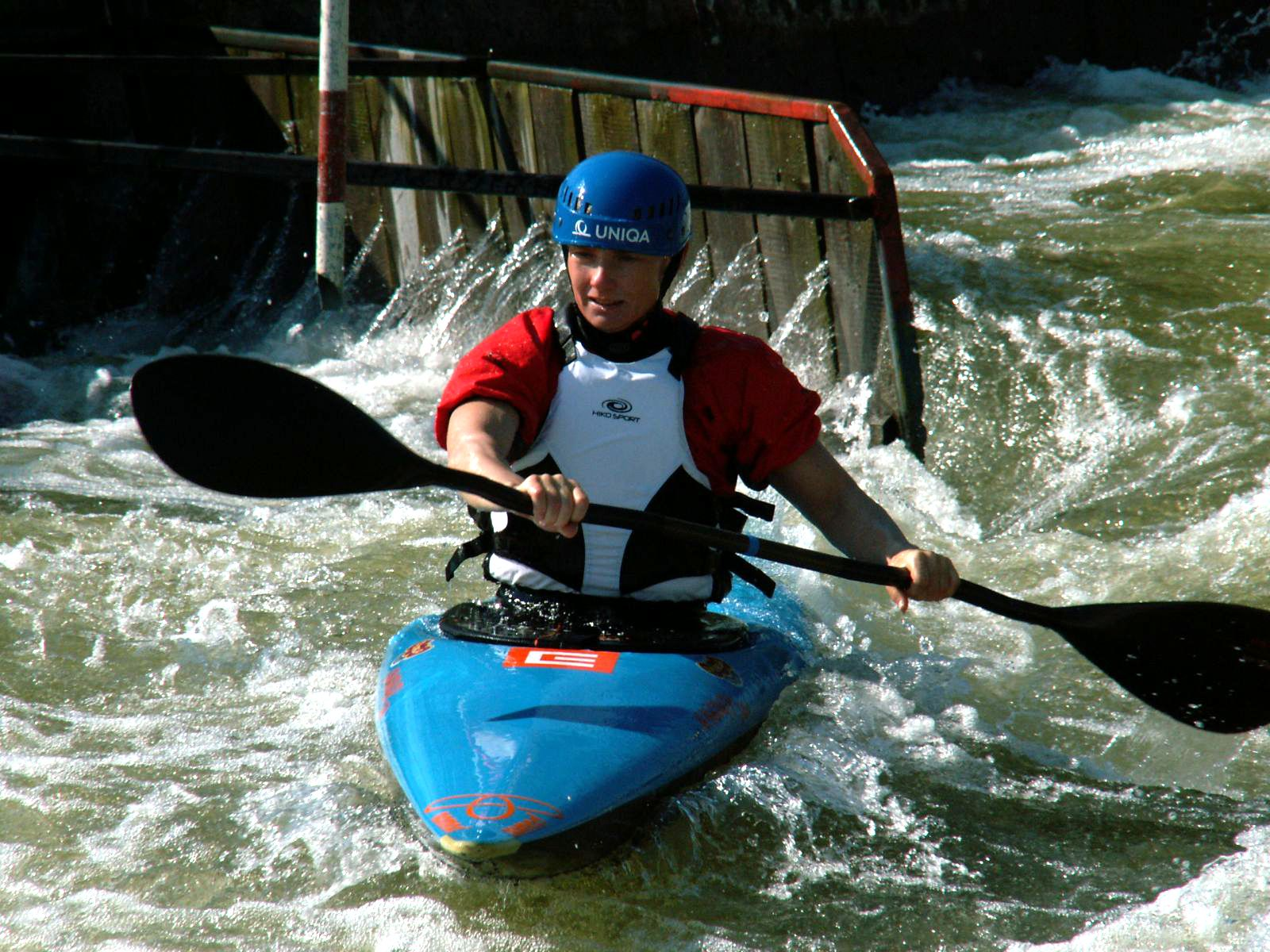
- Hilgertová in 2007

Personal information
- Born: Štěpánka Prošková; 10 April 1968 (age 58) Prague, Czechoslovakia
- Height: 164 cm (5 ft 5 in)
- Weight: 54 kg (119 lb)
- Spouse: Luboš Hilgert (born 1960)
- Children: Luboš Hilgert (born 1986)

Sport
- Club: DUKLA - Czech army club
- Coached by: Luboš Hilgert (husband)
Medal record
Women's canoe slalom
Representing Czechoslovakia
World Championships
Silver medal – second place	1991 Tacen	K1 team
Bronze medal – third place	1989 Savage River	K1 team
Representing Czech Republic
Olympic Games
Gold medal – first place	1996 Atlanta	K1
Gold medal – first place	2000 Sydney	K1
World Championships
Gold medal – first place	1999 La Seu d'Urgell	K1
Gold medal – first place	2003 Augsburg	K1
Gold medal – first place	2003 Augsburg	K1 team
Gold medal – first place	2005 Penrith	K1 team
Gold medal – first place	2010 Tacen	K1 team
Gold medal – first place	2013 Prague	K1 team
Gold medal – first place	2015 London	K1 team
Silver medal – second place	1997 Três Coroas	K1
Silver medal – second place	2006 Prague	K1 team
Silver medal – second place	2007 Foz do Iguaçu	K1 team
Silver medal – second place	2011 Bratislava	K1 team
Bronze medal – third place	2007 Foz do Iguaçu	K1
European Championships
Gold medal – first place	1996 Augsburg	K1 team
Gold medal – first place	1998 Roudnice nad Labem	K1 team
Gold medal – first place	2000 Mezzana	K1
Gold medal – first place	2002 Bratislava	K1 team
Gold medal – first place	2008 Kraków	K1
Gold medal – first place	2011 La Seu d'Urgell	K1 team
Gold medal – first place	2014 Vienna	K1 team
Silver medal – second place	1996 Augsburg	K1
Silver medal – second place	1998 Roudnice nad Labem	K1
Silver medal – second place	2000 Mezzana	K1 team
Silver medal – second place	2005 Tacen	K1
Silver medal – second place	2006 L'Argentière-la-Bessée	K1 team
Bronze medal – third place	2002 Bratislava	K1
Bronze medal – third place	2007 Liptovský Mikuláš	K1
Bronze medal – third place	2013 Krakow	K1 team

Štěpánka Hilgertová (Czech pronunciation: [ˈʃcɛpaːŋka ˈɦɪlɡɛrtovaː], née Prošková, born 10 April 1968 in Prague) is a former Czechoslovak-Czech slalom canoeist who competed at the international level from 1988 to 2017. Competing in six Summer Olympics, she won two gold medals in the K1 event, earning them in 1996 and 2000.

Hilgertová also won fourteen medals at the ICF Canoe Slalom World Championships with seven golds (K1: 1999, 2003; K1 team: 2003, 2005, 2010, 2013, 2015), five silvers (K1: 1997, K1 team: 1991, 2006, 2007, 2011), and two bronzes (K1: 2007, K1 team: 1989). The K1 team silver in 1991 and K1 team bronze in 1989 were with Czechoslovakia while the remaining medals were for the Czech Republic.

She won the overall World Cup title twice (1992 and 1998). She also won a total of 15 medals at the European Championships (7 golds, 5 silvers and 3 bronzes).

She announced her retirement from the professional sport in October 2017, at the age of 49. She did, however, state that she intends to continue competing as an amateur.

Her husband Luboš Hilgert is a former canoe slalom paddler and a multiple medalist from ICF Canoe Slalom World Championships. Their son Luboš also competed in canoe slalom. Amálie Hilgertová is her niece.

== World Cup individual podiums ==
	1st place, gold medalist(s)	2nd place, silver medalist(s)	3rd place, bronze medalist(s)	Total
K1	20	12	15	47

Season	Date	Venue	Position	Event
1988	14 August 1988	Nottingham	1st	K1
1989	12 August 1989	Mezzana	3rd	K1
1990	1 July 1990	Wausau	3rd	K1
1990	12 August 1990	Augsburg	3rd	K1
1990	18 August 1990	Bourg St.-Maurice	3rd	K1
1991	10 July 1991	Reals	3rd	K1
1991	25 August 1991	Minden	2nd	K1
1991	1 September 1991	Wausau	2nd	K1
1992	23 February 1992	Launceston	2nd	K1
1992	7 June 1992	Merano	1st	K1
1993	25 July 1993	Lofer	3rd	K1
1994	26 June 1994	Nottingham	2nd	K1
1994	10 July 1994	Bourg St.-Maurice	3rd	K1
1995	25 June 1995	Prague	1st	K1
1995	9 July 1995	Mezzana	2nd	K1
1995	16 July 1995	Lofer	1st	K1
1996	21 April 1996	Ocoee	1st	K1
1996	25 August 1996	Prague	1st	K1
1997	22 June 1997	Bourg St.-Maurice	2nd	K1
1998	14 June 1998	Liptovský Mikuláš	2nd	K1
1998	28 June 1998	Augsburg	3rd	K1
1998	13 September 1998	La Seu d'Urgell	1st	K1
1999	20 June 1999	Tacen	1st	K1
1999	24 June 1999	Tacen	1st	K1
1999	3 October 1999	Penrith	3rd	K1
2000	23 July 2000	Prague	1st	K1
2001	27 May 2001	Goumois	1st	K1
2001	10 June 2001	Tacen	2nd	K1
2001	29 July 2001	Augsburg	1st	K1
2002	4 August 2002	Prague	3rd	K1
2003	6 July 2003	La Seu d'Urgell	1st	K1
2003	31 July 2003	Bratislava	3rd	K1
2003	3 August 2003	Bratislava	1st	K1
2004	11 July 2004	Prague	3rd	K1
2004	18 July 2004	Augsburg	1st	K1
2005	26 June 2005	Tacen	2nd	K1^{1}
2005	9 July 2005	Athens	1st	K1
2005	24 July 2005	La Seu d'Urgell	1st	K1
2006	28 May 2006	Athens	1st	K1
2006	4 June 2006	Augsburg	2nd	K1
2007	30 June 2007	Prague	1st	K1
2007	8 July 2007	Tacen	3rd	K1
2008	21 June 2008	Prague	1st	K1
2009	12 July 2009	Augsburg	2nd	K1
2010	20 June 2010	Prague	3rd	K1
2014	22 June 2014	Prague	3rd	K1
2014	17 August 2014	Augsburg	2nd	K1

^{1} European Championship counting for World Cup points

== Decorations ==
Awarded by Czech Republic

- Medal of Merit (2024)
