= 1998 European Canoe Slalom Championships =

Canoe tournament held in Roudnice nad Labem, Czech Republic, 1998

The 1998 European Canoe Slalom Championships took place in Roudnice nad Labem, Czech Republic from 18 to 23 August 1998 under the auspices of the European Canoe Association (ECA). It was the 2nd edition.

== Medal summary ==
=== Men's results ===
==== Canoe ====
Event	Gold	Points	Silver	Points	Bronze	Points
C1	David Jančar (CZE)	194.91	Michal Martikán (SVK)	195.87	Lukáš Pollert (CZE)	196.64
C1 team	Slovakia; Michal Martikán; Juraj Ontko; Juraj Minčík	116.43	Germany; Stefan Pfannmöller; Nico Bettge; Martin Lang	118.93	United Kingdom; Stuart McIntosh; Mark Delaney; Robert Turner	119.45
C2	Slovakia; Pavol Hochschorner; Peter Hochschorner	211.60	Czech Republic; Jaroslav Volf; Ondřej Štěpánek	211.66	Slovakia; Milan Kubáň; Marián Olejník	213.99
C2 team	Czech Republic; Petr Štercl & Pavel Štercl; Jaroslav Pospíšil & Jaroslav Pollert; Ondřej Štěpánek & Jaroslav Volf	128.35	Slovakia; Milan Kubáň & Marián Olejník; Roman Štrba & Roman Vajs; Pavol Hochschorner & Peter Hochschorner	129.06	France; Éric Biau & Bertrand Daille; Philippe Quémerais & Yann Le Pennec; Alexandre Lauvergne & Nathanael Fouquet	132.87

==== Kayak ====
Event	Gold	Points	Silver	Points	Bronze	Points
K1	Paul Ratcliffe (GBR)	180.86	Thomas Becker (GER)	184.02	Andrew Raspin (GBR)	188.20
K1 team	Germany; Thomas Becker; Ralf Schaberg; Thomas Schmidt	110.84	Czech Republic; Ondřej Raab; Jiří Prskavec; Vojtěch Bareš	111.15	Slovenia; Andraž Vehovar; Fedja Marušič; Uroš Kodelja	111.87

=== Women's results ===
==== Kayak ====
Event	Gold	Points	Silver	Points	Bronze	Points
K1	Elena Kaliská (SVK)	204.12	Štěpánka Hilgertová (CZE)	205.85	Sandra Friedli (SUI)	215.40
K1 team	Czech Republic; Štěpánka Hilgertová; Irena Pavelková; Marcela Sadilová	131.53	United Kingdom; Rachel Crosbee; Laura Blakeman; Heather Corrie	137.06	Germany; Kordula Striepecke; Evi Huss; Mandy Planert	137.86

== Medal table ==
Rank	Nation	Gold	Silver	Bronze	Total
1	Czech Republic (CZE)	3	3	1	7
2	Slovakia (SVK)	3	2	1	6
3	Germany (GER)	1	2	1	4
4	Great Britain (GBR)	1	1	2	4
5	France (FRA)	0	0	1	1
5	Slovenia (SLO)	0	0	1	1
5	Switzerland (SUI)	0	0	1	1
Totals (7 entries)		8	8	8	24
