= Philippe Quémerais =

French slalom canoeist (born 1971)

Medal record

Men's canoe slalom

Representing France

World Championships
Gold medal – first place	2002 Bourg St.-Maurice	C2 team
Bronze medal – third place	1999 La Seu d'Urgell	C2 team

European Championships
Silver medal – second place	2002 Bratislava	C2 team
Silver medal – second place	2006 L'Argentière-la-Bessée	C2 team
Bronze medal – third place	1998 Roudnice nad Labem	C2 team
Bronze medal – third place	2005 Tacen	C2 team

Philippe Quémerais (born 2 July 1971 in Rennes) is a French slalom canoeist who competed in the 1990s and 2000s.

He won two medals in the C2 team event at the ICF Canoe Slalom World Championships with a gold in 2002 and a bronze in 1999. He also has two silvers and two bronzes from the same event from the European Championships.

Quémerais finished fifth in the C2 event at the 2004 Summer Olympics in Athens. His partner in the boat throughout his career was Yann Le Pennec.

His partner in the boat throughout the whole of his career was Yann Le Pennec.

== World Cup individual podiums ==
Season	Date	Venue	Position	Event
2001	9 Sep 2001	Wausau	3rd	C2
2002	14 Sep 2002	Tibagi	2nd	C2
2004	25 Jul 2004	Bourg St.-Maurice	1st	C2
