= Frank Henze =

German canoeist

Medal record

Men's canoe slalom

Representing Germany

World Championships
Silver medal – second place	2002 Bourg St.-Maurice	C2 team
Silver medal – second place	2009 La Seu d'Urgell	C2 team
Bronze medal – third place	2010 Tacen	C2 team

European Championships
Gold medal – first place	2006 L'Argentière-la-Bessée	C2 team
Gold medal – first place	2007 Liptovský Mikuláš	C2 team
Gold medal – first place	2008 Kraków	C2 team
Silver medal – second place	2011 La Seu d'Urgell	C2 team
Bronze medal – third place	2002 Bratislava	C2 team
Bronze medal – third place	2012 Augsburg	C2 team

Junior European Championships
Bronze medal – third place	1995 Liptovský Mikuláš	C2

Frank Henze (born 1 April 1977 in Leipzig) is a German slalom canoeist who competed at the international level from 1995 to 2013.

He won three medals in the C2 team event at the ICF Canoe Slalom World Championships with two silvers (2002, 2009) and a bronze (2010). He won six more medals at the European Championships in the same event (3 golds, 1 silver and 2 bronzes).

At the 2012 Summer Olympics he competed in the C2 event. He did not advance to the semifinals after finishing 11th in the qualifying round.

His partner in the boat between 1998 and 2002 was Kai Walter. From 2005 to 2013 he competed internationally with David Schröder.

His father Jürgen Henze was a world champion the C2 team event and his younger brother Stefan Henze was a silver medalist from the C2 event at the 2004 Summer Olympics in Athens.

== World Cup individual podiums ==
Season	Date	Venue	Position	Event
2002	26 May 2002	Guangzhou	2nd	C2
2002	20 Jul 2002	Augsburg	2nd	C2
2002	14 Sep 2002	Tibagi	3rd	C2
2010	3 Jul 2010	Augsburg	1st	C2
