= Kai Walter =

German slalom canoeist (born 1973)

Medal record

Men's canoe slalom

Representing Germany

World Championships
Silver medal – second place	2002 Bourg St.-Maurice	C2 team

European Championships
Bronze medal – third place	2002 Bratislava	C2 team

Kai Walter (born 1973) is a German slalom canoeist who competed from the late 1990s to the early 2000s.

He won a silver medal in the C2 team event at the 2002 ICF Canoe Slalom World Championships in Bourg St.-Maurice. He also won a bronze medal in the same event at the 2002 European Championships in Bratislava.

His partner throughout his international career was Frank Henze.

== World Cup individual podiums ==
Season	Date	Venue	Position	Event
2002	26 May 2002	Guangzhou	2nd	C2
2002	20 July 2002	Augsburg	2nd	C2
2002	14 September 2002	Tibagi	3rd	C2
