= 2002 ICF Canoe Slalom World Championships =

Canoe slalom event in Bourg St.-Maurice, France

The 2002 ICF Canoe Slalom World Championships were held in Bourg St.-Maurice, France under the auspices of International Canoe Federation for the record-tying third time. It was the 27th edition. Bourg St.-Maurice hosted the championships previously in 1969 and 1987, and matches the times hosted by Spittal, Austria (1963, 1965, 1977) and Meran, Italy (1953, 1971, 1983). Beginning at these championships, this event would be held on an annual basis in non-Summer Olympic years. The 2001 championships were scheduled to take place in Ducktown, Tennessee (East of Chattanooga) in September that year on the canoe slalom course used for the 1996 Summer Olympics in neighboring Atlanta, but were cancelled in the wake of the September 11 attacks.

== Medal summary ==
=== Men's ===
==== Canoe ====
Event	Gold	Points	Silver	Points	Bronze	Points
C1	Michal Martikán (SVK)	192.92	Jan Benzien (GER)	199.29	Patrice Estanguet (FRA)	199.32
C1 team	Czech Republic; Přemysl Vlk; Jan Mašek; Stanislav Ježek	224.27	Germany; Sören Kaufmann; Jan Benzien; Stefan Pfannmöller	226.55	Slovenia; Jurij Korenjak; Dejan Stevanovič; Simon Hočevar	236.59
C2	Slovakia; Pavol Hochschorner; Peter Hochschorner	206.21	France; Pierre Luquet; Christophe Luquet	209.41	Czech Republic; Marek Jiras; Tomáš Máder	209.53
C2 team	France; Pierre Luquet & Christophe Luquet; Alexandre Lauvergne & Nathanael Fouquet; Philippe Quémerais & Yann Le Pennec	239.09	Germany; Kay Simon & Robby Simon; Kai Walter & Frank Henze; André Ehrenberg & Michael Senft	257.07	Poland; Dariusz Wrzosek & Bartłomiej Kruczek; Jarosław Miczek & Wojciech Sekuła; Andrzej Wójs & Sławomir Mordarski	265.80

==== Kayak ====
Event	Gold	Points	Silver	Points	Bronze	Points
K1	Fabien Lefèvre (FRA)	184.89	Miha Terdič (SLO)	189.94	Ivan Pišvejc (CZE)	190.10
K1 team	Germany; Claus Suchanek; Thomas Becker; Thomas Schmidt	214.11	Italy; Pierpaolo Ferrazzi; Matteo Pontarollo; Luca Costa	216.64	France; Thomas Monier; Benoît Peschier; Fabien Lefèvre	218.25

=== Women's ===
==== Kayak ====
Event	Gold	Points	Silver	Points	Bronze	Points
K1	Rebecca Giddens (USA)	216.09	Mandy Planert (GER)	218.11	Cristina Giai Pron (ITA)	222.46
K1 team	France; Aline Tornare; Mathilde Pichery; Anne-Lise Bardet	294.73	Czech Republic; Marie Řihošková; Marcela Sadilová; Irena Pavelková	298.78	United Kingdom; Helen Reeves; Laura Blakeman; Heather Corrie	306.24

== Medal table ==
Rank	Nation	Gold	Silver	Bronze	Total
1	France (FRA)	3	1	2	6
2	Slovakia (SVK)	2	0	0	2
3	Germany (GER)	1	4	0	5
4	Czech Republic (CZE)	1	1	2	4
5	United States (USA)	1	0	0	1
6	Italy (ITA)	0	1	1	2
6	Slovenia (SLO)	0	1	1	2
8	Great Britain (GBR)	0	0	1	1
8	Poland (POL)	0	0	1	1
Totals (9 entries)		8	8	8	24
