= 2005 Canoe Slalom World Cup =

Series of eight races in 4 canoeing and kayaking

The 2005 Canoe Slalom World Cup was a series of eight races in 4 canoeing and kayaking categories organized by the International Canoe Federation (ICF). It was the 18th edition. The series consisted of 4 continental championships (European, Pan American, Oceania and Asian), 3 world cup races and the world championships.

== Calendar ==
Label	Venue	Date
2005 Continental Cup Oceania	(New Zealand) Mangahao	29–30 January
2005 European Canoe Slalom Championships	(Slovenia) Tacen	24–26 June
2005 Asia Canoe Slalom Championships	(South Korea) Naein-chun, Inje	1–2 July
World Cup Race 1	(Greece) Athens	8–10 July
World Cup Race 2	(Germany) Augsburg	15–17 July
World Cup Race 3	(Spain) La Seu d'Urgell	23–24 July
2005 Pan American Championships	(United States) Kern River	26–27 August
2005 World Championships	(Australia) Penrith	29 September - 3 October

== Final standings ==
The winner of each world cup race was awarded 30 points. Semifinalists were guaranteed at least 5 points and paddlers eliminated in heats received 2 points each. The continental championships had a lesser status with the winner earning 20 points, semifinalists at least 2 points and all others were awarded 1 point for participation. Because the continental championships were not open to all countries, every athlete could only compete in one of them. The world championships points scale was the same as for the world cups multiplied by a factor of 1.5. That meant the world champion earned 45 points, semifinalists got at least 7.5 points and paddlers eliminated in heats received 3 points apiece. If two or more athletes or boats were equal on points, the ranking was determined by their positions at the world championships.

=== C1 men ===
Pos	Athlete	Points
1	Robin Bell (AUS)	105
2	Jan Benzien (GER)	91
3	Tony Estanguet (FRA)	87.5
4	Juraj Minčík (SVK)	81
5	Michal Martikán (SVK)	79
6	Stanislav Ježek (CZE)	64
7	Stuart McIntosh (GBR)	63.5
8	Stefan Pfannmöller (GER)	62.5
9	Pierre Labarelle (FRA)	56.5
10	David Florence (GBR)	56

=== C2 men ===
Pos	Athletes	Points
1	Jaroslav Volf/Ondřej Štěpánek (CZE)	117.5
2	Marcus Becker/Stefan Henze (GER)	102
3	Ladislav Škantár/Peter Škantár (SVK)	95
4	Pavol Hochschorner/Peter Hochschorner (SVK)	90
5	Milan Kubáň/Marián Olejník (SVK)	89.5
6	Christian Bahmann/Michael Senft (GER)	81
7	Stuart Bowman/Nick Smith (GBR)	77.5
8	Marek Jiras/Tomáš Máder (CZE)	76
9	Cédric Forgit/Martin Braud (FRA)	72
10	Kay Simon/Robby Simon (GER)	64.5

=== K1 men ===
Pos	Athlete	Points
1	Fabian Dörfler (GER)	103
2	Daniele Molmenti (ITA)	96
3	David Ford (CAN)	87
4	Fabien Lefèvre (FRA)	76.5
5	Helmut Oblinger (AUT)	75
6	Campbell Walsh (GBR)	73.5
7	Peter Kauzer (SLO)	64.5
8	Erik Pfannmöller (GER)	59.5
9	Dejan Kralj (SLO)	57.5
10	Peter Cibák (SVK)	54

=== K1 women ===
Pos	Athlete	Points
1	Elena Kaliská (SVK)	115
2	Štěpánka Hilgertová (CZE)	112
3	Mandy Planert (GER)	107.5
4	Jana Dukátová (SVK)	86.5
5	Marcela Sadilová (CZE)	76.5
6	Laura Blakeman (GBR)	73
7	Peggy Dickens (FRA)	70
8	Jennifer Bongardt (GER)	65.5
9	Irena Pavelková (CZE)	62.5
10	Violetta Oblinger-Peters (AUT)	61.5

== Results ==
=== 2005 Continental Cup Oceania ===
Continental Cup Oceania took place in Mangahao, New Zealand from 29 to 30 January. The C1 event did not count for the world cup and the C2 event was not held.

Event	Gold	Score	Silver	Score	Bronze	Score
K1 men	Anthony Brown (AUS)	176.75	John Wilkie (AUS)	180.77	Warwick Draper (AUS)	181.93
K1 women	Katrina Lawrence (AUS)	208.40	Jacqueline Lawrence (AUS)	209.85	Helena Merrett (AUS)	222.36

=== 2005 European Championships ===
The European Championships took place at the Tacen Whitewater Course, Slovenia from 24 to 26 June.

Event	Gold	Score	Silver	Score	Bronze	Score
C1 men	Stefan Pfannmöller (GER)	200.55	Alexander Slafkovský (SVK)	201.32	Stuart McIntosh (GBR)	201.74
C2 men	Czech Republic; Jaroslav Volf; Ondřej Štěpánek	211.60	Czech Republic; Marek Jiras; Tomáš Máder	212.82	Slovakia; Ladislav Škantár; Peter Škantár	213.08
K1 men	Helmut Oblinger (AUT)	187.39	Peter Kauzer (SLO)	188.25	Erik Pfannmöller (GER)	188.86
K1 women	Mandy Planert (GER)	216.01	Štěpánka Hilgertová (CZE)	216.32	Irena Pavelková (CZE)	219.08

=== 2005 Asia Canoe Slalom Championships ===
The Asia Canoe Slalom Championships took place in Naein-chun, Inje, South Korea from 1 to 2 July.

Event	Gold	Score	Silver	Score	Bronze	Score
C1 men	Takuya Haneda (JPN)	121.02	Tan Zhiqiang (CHN)	122.04	Yoichiro Hattori (JPN)	125.97
C2 men	China; Fuxin Teng; Xugo W.	139.01	Chinese Taipei; Ou Yang-Ju; Chen H.	150.39	Iran; Mohsen Ghoreishi ???	161.47
K1 men	Tsubasa Sasaki (JPN)	98.44	Shuji Yamanaka (JPN)	102.68	Shumpei Sato (JPN)	105.31
K1 women	Keiko Nakayama (JPN)	118.12	Noriyo Kawaguchi (JPN)	120.54	Zou Yingying (CHN)	121.57

=== World Cup Race 1 ===
The first regular world cup race of the series took place at the Hellinikon Olympic Canoe/Kayak Slalom Centre in Athens, Greece from 8 to 10 July.

Event	Gold	Score	Silver	Score	Bronze	Score
C1 men	Mariusz Wieczorek (POL)	190.99	Robin Bell (AUS)	192.68	Stanislav Ježek (CZE)	192.69
C2 men	Czech Republic; Jaroslav Volf; Ondřej Štěpánek	199.06	Slovakia; Pavol Hochschorner; Peter Hochschorner	205.88	Slovakia; Ladislav Škantár; Peter Škantár	206.35
K1 men	Fabien Lefèvre (FRA)	178.12	Daniele Molmenti (ITA)	182.16	Peter Kauzer (SLO)	183.10
K1 women	Štěpánka Hilgertová (CZE)	201.54	Jana Dukátová (SVK)	203.62	Mandy Planert (GER)	205.24

=== World Cup Race 2 ===
World Cup Race 2 took place at the Augsburg Eiskanal, Germany from 15 to 17 July.

Event	Gold	Score	Silver	Score	Bronze	Score
C1 men	Jan Benzien (GER)	200.00	Juraj Minčík (SVK)	200.86	Tony Estanguet (FRA)	201.56
C2 men	Germany; Marcus Becker; Stefan Henze	203.39	Germany; Christian Bahmann; Michael Senft	212.39	Germany; Kay Simon; Robby Simon	213.97
K1 men	Fabian Dörfler (GER)	188.25	Campbell Walsh (GBR)	190.26	Boris Neveu (FRA)	191.70
K1 women	Mandy Planert (GER)	208.99	Jana Dukátová (SVK)	211.51	Peggy Dickens (FRA)	219.74

=== World Cup Race 3 ===
World Cup Race 3 took place at the Segre Olympic Park in La Seu d'Urgell, Spain from 23 to 24 July.

Event	Gold	Score	Silver	Score	Bronze	Score
C1 men	Tony Estanguet (FRA)	207.21	Robin Bell (AUS)	209.12	David Florence (GBR)	213.93
C2 men	Slovakia; Pavol Hochschorner; Peter Hochschorner	213.74	Czech Republic; Jaroslav Volf; Ondřej Štěpánek	223.75	Slovakia; Ladislav Škantár; Peter Škantár	225.64
K1 men	Daniele Molmenti (ITA)	201.49	Erik Pfannmöller (GER)	201.71	Matteo Pontarollo (ITA)	202.33
K1 women	Štěpánka Hilgertová (CZE)	221.07	Elena Kaliská (SVK)	224.61	Mathilde Pichery (FRA)	227.32

=== 2005 Pan American Championships ===
The Pan American Championships took place on the Kern River in California from 26 to 27 August.

Event	Gold	Score	Silver	Score	Bronze	Score
C1 men	Jeff Larimer (USA)	223.71	James Cartwright (CAN)	224.16	Cassio Ramon Petry (BRA)	225.83
C2 men	Canada; François Letourneau; Benoît Gauthier	256.47	United States; Mark Poindexter; Benjamin Kvanli	260.82	United States; Bryant Grigsby; Aaron Sarver	269.24
K1 men	David Ford (CAN)	198.80	Brett Heyl (USA)	199.73	John Hastings (CAN)	200.92
K1 women	Zuzana Vanha (USA)	248.91	Jamie Tidmore (USA)	251.99	Paris Robinson (USA)	260.83

=== 2005 World Championships ===
The World Championships took place at the Penrith Whitewater Stadium, Australia from 29 September to 3 October.

Event	Gold	Score	Silver	Score	Bronze	Score
C1 men	Robin Bell (AUS)	209.26	Tony Estanguet (FRA)	209.47	Michal Martikán (SVK)	210.64
C2 men	Germany; Christian Bahmann; Michael Senft	224.40	Slovakia; Milan Kubáň; Marián Olejník	229.02	Germany; Marcus Becker; Stefan Henze	230.49
K1 men	Fabian Dörfler (GER)	201.35	Fabien Lefèvre (FRA)	204.09	Peter Cibák (SVK)	207.25
K1 women	Elena Kaliská (SVK)	219.86	Mandy Planert (GER)	222.69	Peggy Dickens (FRA)	229.38
