= Fabien Lefèvre =

French slalom canoeist (born 1982)

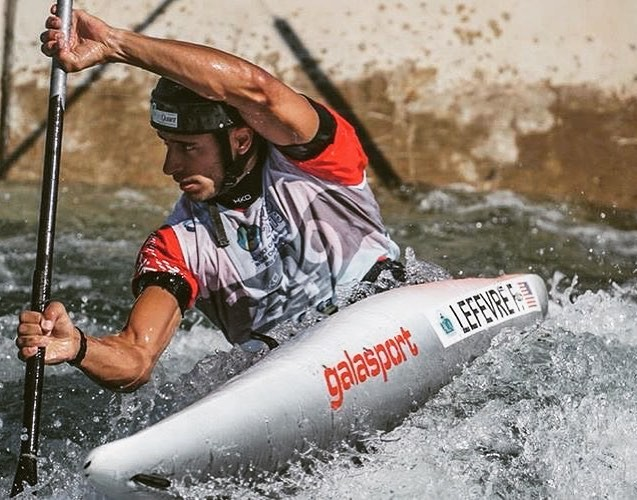
- LeFevre 2018 ICF Canoe Slalom World Championships

Personal information
- Born: 18 June 1982 (age 44) Orléans, France
Medal record
Men's canoe slalom
Event	1st	2nd	3rd
Olympic Games	0	1	1
World Championships	6	5	2
European Championships	0	0	2
U23 European Championships	1	0	0
Junior World Championships	0	0	1
Junior European Championships	1	1	0
Total	9	7	6
Representing France
Olympic Games
Silver medal – second place	2008 Beijing	K1
Bronze medal – third place	2004 Athens	K1
World Championships
Gold medal – first place	2002 Bourg St.-Maurice	K1
Gold medal – first place	2003 Augsburg	K1
Gold medal – first place	2005 Penrith	K1 team
Gold medal – first place	2006 Prague	K1 team
Gold medal – first place	2010 Tacen	C2 team
Gold medal – first place	2011 Bratislava	C2 team
Silver medal – second place	2005 Penrith	K1
Silver medal – second place	2010 Tacen	C2
Silver medal – second place	2010 Tacen	K1 team
Silver medal – second place	2011 Bratislava	C2
Silver medal – second place	2011 Bratislava	K1 team
Bronze medal – third place	2002 Bourg St.-Maurice	K1 team
Bronze medal – third place	2011 Bratislava	K1
European Championships
Bronze medal – third place	2009 Nottingham	K1 team
Bronze medal – third place	2011 La Seu d'Urgell	K1 team
U23 European Championships
Gold medal – first place	2002 Bratislava	K1
Junior World Championships
Bronze medal – third place	1998 Lofer	K1 team
Junior European Championships
Gold medal – first place	1999 Solkan	K1
Silver medal – second place	1999 Solkan	K1 team
Representing United States
World Championships
Gold medal – first place	2014 Deep Creek Lake	C1

Fabien Lefèvre (born 18 June 1982) is a French slalom canoeist who has competed at the international level since 1998. As a permanent resident of the United States, he has competed for his country of residence since 2013. He represented France until 2011. He won two medals at the Summer Olympics in the K1 event with a silver in 2008 and a bronze in 2004. He has a son called Noe Lefèvre.

Lefèvre also won fourteen medals at the ICF Canoe Slalom World Championships with seven golds (C1: 2014, K1: 2002, 2003; C2 team: 2010, 2011; K1 team: 2005, 2006), five silvers (C2: 2010, 2011; K1: 2005, K1 team: 2010, 2011), and two bronzes (K1 team: 2002, K1: 2011).

He is the overall World Cup champion in the K1 class from 2002. He also won two bronze medals at the European Championships in the K1 team event.

== Career ==
Fabien Lefevre began kayaking at the age of 5. At the age of 20, he won the K1 event at the 2002 ICF Canoe Slalom World Championships in Bourg-Saint-Maurice. He backed up this result by winning the 2002 World Cup title. One year later he was able to defend the K1 world title in Augsburg.

These victories made him the favorite for the 2004 Summer Olympics in Athens. However, he was only able to capture bronze after touching a gate in both semifinal and final run. He recorded the fastest running time but the 4 penalty seconds pushed him down to third.

At the 2005 World Championships in Penrith, New South Wales he won a silver medal in the K1 event, losing only to Fabian Dörfler. He won the K1 team title, however, together with Benoît Peschier and Julien Billaut. He won the K1 team gold again in 2006, this time joined by Julien Billaut and Boris Neveu. He finished 5th in the individual event in 2006 in a race where two winners were declared by the ICF jury (Julien Billaut and Stefano Cipressi).

In 2007 a serious wrist injury prevented him from taking part at the World Championships in Foz do Iguaçu, won by his compatriot Sébastien Combot.

He regained his place in the French team in 2008 and won the selection for the 2008 Summer Olympics in Beijing by defeating the reigning Olympic champion Benoît Peschier at the French trials. Lefèvre was third after the semifinal run and improved to silver medal position in the final. Benjamin Boukpeti, a friend of Lefèvre, won the first Olympic medal for Togo with a bronze, while Alexander Grimm took gold.

In late 2008, inspired by Michael Phelps, he decided to take up the double canoe discipline (C2) together with Denis Gargaud Chanut, while continuing to race in single kayak (K1) with the ambition to appear in both categories at the 2012 Summer Olympics. Lefèvre failed to medal at the 2009 World Championships in La Seu d'Urgell in either category though. The extreme fatigue he felt after the races made him doubt his project.

However, he continued in both categories in 2010 and ended the year with a silver medal in the C2 event at the World Championships in Tacen. He also added a gold medal in the C2 team event and a silver in the K1 team event. A year later at the 2011 World Championships in Bratislava he made history by becoming the first slalom canoeist since Charles Dussuet in 1953 to win 4 medals at the same Championships.

The success, however, was followed by a disappointment in 2012 after failing to qualify for the Olympics in London in either category.

Nonetheless, after 2012, Fabien moved to the United States and began competing as an American Canoe Slalom Athlete. Fabien began training with the Potomac Whitewater Racing Center (a U.S. Olympic Center of Excellence). Subsequently, at the 2014 World Championship in Deep Creek Lake, he won the gold medal in C1, becoming the first male slalom canoeist to win the World Championship title in C1 and K1.

== World Cup individual podiums ==
	1st place, gold medalist(s)	2nd place, silver medalist(s)	3rd place, bronze medalist(s)	Total
K1	8	3	3	14
C2	0	2	0	2
Total	8	5	3	16

Season	Date	Venue	Position	Event
2001	9 September 2001	Wausau	2nd	K1
2002	20 July 2002	Augsburg	1st	K1
2002	4 August 2002	Prague	1st	K1
2002	15 September 2002	Tibagi	2nd	K1
2003	6 July 2003	La Seu d'Urgell	1st	K1
2003	31 July 2003	Bratislava	1st	K1
2004	25 April 2004	Athens	1st	K1
2004	11 July 2004	Prague	1st	K1
2005	10 July 2005	Athens	1st	K1
2005	2 October 2005	Penrith	2nd	K1^{1}
2006	3 June 2006	Augsburg	3rd	K1
2008	22 June 2008	Prague	1st	K1
2009	28 June 2009	Pau	2nd	C2
2009	28 June 2009	Pau	3rd	K1
2010	3 July 2010	Augsburg	2nd	C2
2013	22 June 2013	Cardiff	3rd	K1

^{1} World Championship counting for World Cup points

== Coaching in Performance and Healing ==
While Fabien was an Olympian and World Champion he learned to manage extreme levels of stress. He developed successful strategies and techniques to manage the heart, mind and body.

He serves as a coach to support people to integrate their mind, body and spirit so they can live fulfilling lives. This supports happiness, love, healing and even high performance. His current site https://quantum-coaching-healing.us/
