= Irena Pavelková =

Czech slalom canoeist (born 1974)

Medal record

Women's canoe slalom

Representing Czechoslovakia

Junior World Championships
| Gold medal – first place | 1992 Sjoa | K1 team |
| Silver medal – second place | 1990 Tavanasa | K1 |
| Silver medal – second place | 1990 Tavanasa | K1 team |
| Bronze medal – third place | 1992 Sjoa | K1 |

Representing Czech Republic

World Championships
| Gold medal – first place | 2003 Augsburg | K1 team |
| Gold medal – first place | 2005 Penrith | K1 team |
| Gold medal – first place | 2010 Tacen | K1 team |
| Silver medal – second place | 2002 Bourg-Saint-Maurice | K1 team |
| Silver medal – second place | 2006 Prague | K1 team |
| Silver medal – second place | 2007 Foz do Iguaçu | K1 team |
| Silver medal – second place | 2011 Bratislava | K1 team |

European Championships
| Gold medal – first place | 1996 Augsburg | K1 team |
| Gold medal – first place | 1998 Roudnice nad Labem | K1 team |
| Gold medal – first place | 2002 Bratislava | K1 team |
| Gold medal – first place | 2011 La Seu d'Urgell | K1 team |
| Silver medal – second place | 2000 Mezzana | K1 team |
| Silver medal – second place | 2002 Bratislava | K1 |
| Silver medal – second place | 2006 L'Argentière-la-Bessée | K1 team |
| Bronze medal – third place | 2000 Mezzana | K1 |
| Bronze medal – third place | 2004 Skopje | K1 |
| Bronze medal – third place | 2005 Tacen | K1 |
| Bronze medal – third place | 2008 Kraków | K1 |

Irena Pavelková (born 5 September 1974 in Mladá Boleslav) is a Czech slalom canoeist who competed at the international level from 1990 to 2012.

She won seven medals in the K1 team event at the ICF Canoe Slalom World Championships with three golds (2003, 2005, 2010) and four silvers (2002, 2006, 2007, 2011).

She is the overall World Cup champion from 1997. She also won a total of 11 medals at the European Championships (4 golds, 3 silvers and 4 bronzes).

Pavelková also competed in three Summer Olympics, earning her best finish of fifth in the K1 event in Sydney in 2000.

== World Cup individual podiums ==
| | 1st place, gold medalist(s) | 2nd place, silver medalist(s) | 3rd place, bronze medalist(s) | Total |
| K1 | 3 | 7 | 7 | 17 |

| Season | Date | Venue | Position | Event |
|---|---|---|---|---|
| 1995 | 2 July 1995 | Tacen | 2nd | K1 |
| 1997 | 22 June 1997 | Bourg-Saint-Maurice | 3rd | K1 |
| 1997 | 6 July 1997 | Bratislava | 2nd | K1 |
| 1997 | 28 July 1997 | Ocoee | 2nd | K1 |
| 1997 | 3 August 1997 | Minden | 1st | K1 |
| 2001 | 27 May 2001 | Goumois | 2nd | K1 |
| 2001 | 3 June 2001 | Merano | 3rd | K1 |
| 2001 | 5 August 2001 | Prague | 2nd | K1 |
| 2002 | 21 July 2002 | Augsburg | 1st | K1 |
| 2002 | 28 July 2002 | Tacen | 1st | K1 |
| 2002 | 14 September 2002 | Tibagi | 2nd | K1 |
| 2004 | 23 April 2004 | Athens | 3rd | K1 |
| 2004 | 23 May 2004 | La Seu d'Urgell | 2nd | K1 |
| 2004 | 25 July 2004 | Bourg-Saint-Maurice | 3rd | K1 |
| 2005 | 26 June 2005 | Tacen | 3rd | K1^{1} |
| 2006 | 28 May 2006 | Athens | 3rd | K1 |
| 2007 | 18 March 2007 | Foz do Iguaçu | 3rd | K1^{2} |

^{1} European Championship counting for World Cup points
^{2} Pan American Championship counting for World Cup points
