= Ján Šajbidor =

Slovak slalom canoeist (born 1982)

Personal information
- Nationality: Slovak
- Born: 29 November 1982 (age 43) Liptovský Mikuláš, Czechoslovakia
- Years active: 1998 - 2015
- Height: 1.85 m (6 ft 1 in)
- Weight: 78 kg (172 lb)

Sport
- Country: Slovakia
- Sport: Canoe slalom
- Event: K1
Medal record
Men's canoe slalom
Representing Slovakia
European Championships
Gold medal – first place	2007 Liptovský Mikuláš	K1
Bronze medal – third place	2002 Bratislava	K1 team
U23 European Championships
Gold medal – first place	2004 Kraków	K1
Junior World Championships
Gold medal – first place	2000 Bratislava	K1

Ján Šajbidor (born 29 November 1982 in Liptovský Mikuláš) is a Slovak slalom canoeist who competed at the international level from 1998 to 2015, specializing in the K1 discipline.

He is the European champion in the men's K1 event from 2007. He also has a team bronze from 2002.

At the 2004 Summer Olympics in Athens in the K1 event he finished 10th in the qualification round, thus progressing to the semifinals. In the semifinals he finished 12th, failing to reach the top ten and the final round.

== Career statistics ==
=== Major championships results timeline ===
Event		2002	2003	2004	2005	2006	2007	2008	2009	2010	2011	2012	2013	2014
Olympic Games	K1	Not held		12	Not held			—	Not held			—	Not held	
World Championships	K1	62	9	Not held	7	16	8	Not held	53	37	—	Not held	27	29
World Championships	K1 team	—	24	Not held	4	7	8	Not held	14	7	—	Not held	17	4
European Championships	K1	—	Not held	21	29	12	1	13	29	9	—	21	29	26
European Championships	K1 team	3	Not held	5	12	7	5	17	11	5	—	11	4	6

=== World Cup individual podiums ===
Season	Date	Venue	Position	Event
2004	25 Jul 2004	Bourg St.-Maurice	3rd	K1
