= 2004 Canoe Slalom World Cup =

The 2004 Canoe Slalom World Cup was a series of six races in 4 canoeing and kayaking categories organized by the International Canoe Federation (ICF). It was the 17th edition. The series consisted of 5 regular world cup races and the world cup final.

== Calendar ==
Label	Venue	Date
World Cup Race 1	(Greece) Athens	22–25 April
World Cup Race 2	(Spain) La Seu d'Urgell	22–23 May
World Cup Race 3	(Italy) Merano	29–30 May
World Cup Race 4	(Czech Republic) Prague	10–11 July
World Cup Race 5	(Germany) Augsburg	16–18 July
World Cup Final	(France) Bourg-Saint-Maurice	23–25 July

== Final standings ==
The winner of each world cup race was awarded 30 points. Semifinalists were guaranteed at least 5 points and paddlers eliminated in heats received 2 points each. The world cup final points scale was multiplied by a factor of 1.5. That meant the winner of the world cup final earned 45 points, semifinalists got at least 7.5 points and paddlers eliminated in heats received 3 points apiece. Only the best five results of each athlete counted for the final world cup standings.

=== C1 men ===
Pos	Athlete	Points
1	Tony Estanguet (FRA)	135
2	Stefan Pfannmöller (GER)	132
3	Jan Benzien (GER)	88
4	Michal Martikán (SVK)	87
5	Alexander Slafkovský (SVK)	82.5
6	Robin Bell (AUS)	78.5
7	Stuart McIntosh (GBR)	77.5
8	Dejan Stevanovič (SLO)	74
9	Jan Mašek (CZE)	65.5
10	Nico Bettge (GER)	64

=== C2 men ===
Pos	Athletes	Points
1	Pavol Hochschorner/Peter Hochschorner (SVK)	145.5
2	Christian Bahmann/Michael Senft (GER)	101
3	Jaroslav Pospíšil/Jaroslav Pollert (CZE)	95
4	Marcus Becker/Stefan Henze (GER)	95
5	Kay Simon/Robby Simon (GER)	81
6	Jaroslav Volf/Ondřej Štěpánek (CZE)	76
7	Philippe Quémerais/Yann Le Pennec (FRA)	70
8	Ľuboš Šoška/Peter Šoška (SVK)	65.5
9	Ladislav Škantár/Peter Škantár (SVK)	62
10	Marek Jiras/Tomáš Máder (CZE)	59

=== K1 men ===
Pos	Athlete	Points
1	Campbell Walsh (GBR)	95.5
2	Thomas Schmidt (GER)	95
3	Stefano Cipressi (ITA)	78
4	Ivan Pišvejc (CZE)	75
5	Fabien Lefèvre (FRA)	74
6	Ján Šajbidor (SVK)	71
7	Benoît Peschier (FRA)	70.5
8	Dejan Kralj (SLO)	67
9	David Ford (CAN)	65
10	Scott Mann (USA)	57

=== K1 women ===
Pos	Athlete	Points
1	Elena Kaliská (SVK)	152
2	Mandy Planert (GER)	120
3	Irena Pavelková (CZE)	87
4	Marcela Sadilová (CZE)	86.5
5	Violetta Oblinger-Peters (AUT)	77
6	Jana Dukátová (SVK)	77
7	Peggy Dickens (FRA)	73.5
8	Helen Reeves (GBR)	65.5
9	Štěpánka Hilgertová (CZE)	57
10	Jenny Apel (GER)	56

== Results ==
=== World Cup Race 1 ===
The first race of the season was held at the newly built Hellinikon Olympic Canoe/Kayak Slalom Centre in Athens, Greece from 22 to 25 April.

Event	Gold	Score	Silver	Score	Bronze	Score
C1 men	Tony Estanguet (FRA)	198.07	Michal Martikán (SVK)	202.47	Stefan Pfannmöller (GER)	202.77
C2 men	Czech Republic; Jaroslav Volf; Ondřej Štěpánek	212.88	France; Martin Braud; Cédric Forgit	213.83	Germany; Christian Bahmann; Michael Senft	214.47
K1 men	Fabien Lefèvre (FRA)	186.97	Campbell Walsh (GBR)	190.06	Helmut Oblinger (AUT)	191.69
K1 women	Elena Kaliská (SVK)	221.79	Mandy Planert (GER)	230.02	Irena Pavelková (CZE)	232.42

=== World Cup Race 2 ===
The second race of the season was held at the Segre Olympic Park in La Seu d'Urgell, Spain from 22 to 23 May.

Event	Gold	Score	Silver	Score	Bronze	Score
C1 men	Tony Estanguet (FRA)	194.31	Stefan Pfannmöller (GER)	195.24	Alexander Slafkovský (SVK)	198.17
C2 men	Slovakia; Pavol Hochschorner; Peter Hochschorner	208.35	Germany; Christian Bahmann; Michael Senft	208.49	Germany; Kay Simon; Robby Simon	212.11
K1 men	Eoin Rheinisch (IRL)	186.03	Campbell Walsh (GBR)	186.05	Helmut Oblinger (AUT)	186.20
K1 women	Helen Reeves (GBR)	207.26	Irena Pavelková (CZE)	208.49	Mandy Planert (GER)	210.52

=== World Cup Race 3 ===
The third race of the season was held in Merano, Italy from 29 to 30 May.

Event	Gold	Score	Silver	Score	Bronze	Score
C1 men	Stefan Pfannmöller (GER)	229.58	Dejan Stevanovič (SLO)	232.66	Jan Benzien (GER)	233.35
C2 men	Slovakia; Pavol Hochschorner; Peter Hochschorner	233.13	Germany; Marcus Becker; Stefan Henze	238.13	Germany; Kay Simon; Robby Simon	239.34
K1 men	Daniele Molmenti (ITA)	216.82	David Ford (CAN)	219.82	Thomas Schmidt (GER)	220.31
K1 women	Elena Kaliská (SVK)	236.41	Mandy Planert (GER)	236.93	Marcela Sadilová (CZE)	240.33

=== World Cup Race 4 ===
The fourth race of the season was held at the Prague-Troja Canoeing Centre, Czech Republic from 10 to 11 July.

Event	Gold	Score	Silver	Score	Bronze	Score
C1 men	Tony Estanguet (FRA)	209.95	Tomáš Indruch (CZE)	210.32	Michal Martikán (SVK)	210.79
C2 men	Slovakia; Pavol Hochschorner; Peter Hochschorner	217.96	Czech Republic; Marek Jiras; Tomáš Máder	223.89	Germany; Christian Bahmann; Michael Senft	225.55
K1 men	Fabien Lefèvre (FRA)	195.11	Michael Kurt (SUI)	198.13	Ivan Pišvejc (CZE)	199.58
K1 women	Elena Kaliská (SVK)	220.14	Mandy Planert (GER)	220.27	Štěpánka Hilgertová (CZE)	223.88

=== World Cup Race 5 ===
The fifth race of the season was held at the Augsburg Eiskanal, Germany from 16 to 18 July.

Event	Gold	Score	Silver	Score	Bronze	Score
C1 men	Stefan Pfannmöller (GER)	190.73	Nico Bettge (GER)	195.75	Olivier Lalliet (FRA)	197.23
C2 men	Czech Republic; Jaroslav Volf; Ondřej Štěpánek	204.84	Czech Republic; Marek Jiras; Tomáš Máder	208.48	Germany; Christian Bahmann; Michael Senft	208.71
K1 men	Thomas Schmidt (GER)	186.13	Ivan Pišvejc (CZE)	186.37	Campbell Walsh (GBR)	187.89
K1 women	Štěpánka Hilgertová (CZE)	203.09	Mandy Planert (GER)	203.68	Marcela Sadilová (CZE)	208.02

=== World Cup Final ===
The final race of the season was held in Bourg-Saint-Maurice, France from 23 to 25 July.

Event	Gold	Score	Silver	Score	Bronze	Score
C1 men	Tony Estanguet (FRA)	192.93	Stuart McIntosh (GBR)	193.50	Michal Martikán (SVK)	194.21
C2 men	France; Philippe Quémerais; Yann Le Pennec	204.43	Slovakia; Pavol Hochschorner; Peter Hochschorner	207.67	Czech Republic; Jaroslav Pospíšil; Jaroslav Pollert	207.76
K1 men	Stefano Cipressi (ITA)	184.28	Benoît Peschier (FRA)	185.02	Ján Šajbidor (SVK)	185.93
K1 women	Elena Kaliská (SVK)	204.95	Peggy Dickens (FRA)	212.79	Irena Pavelková (CZE)	212.91
