= Michal Martikán =

Slovak slalom canoeist (born 1979)

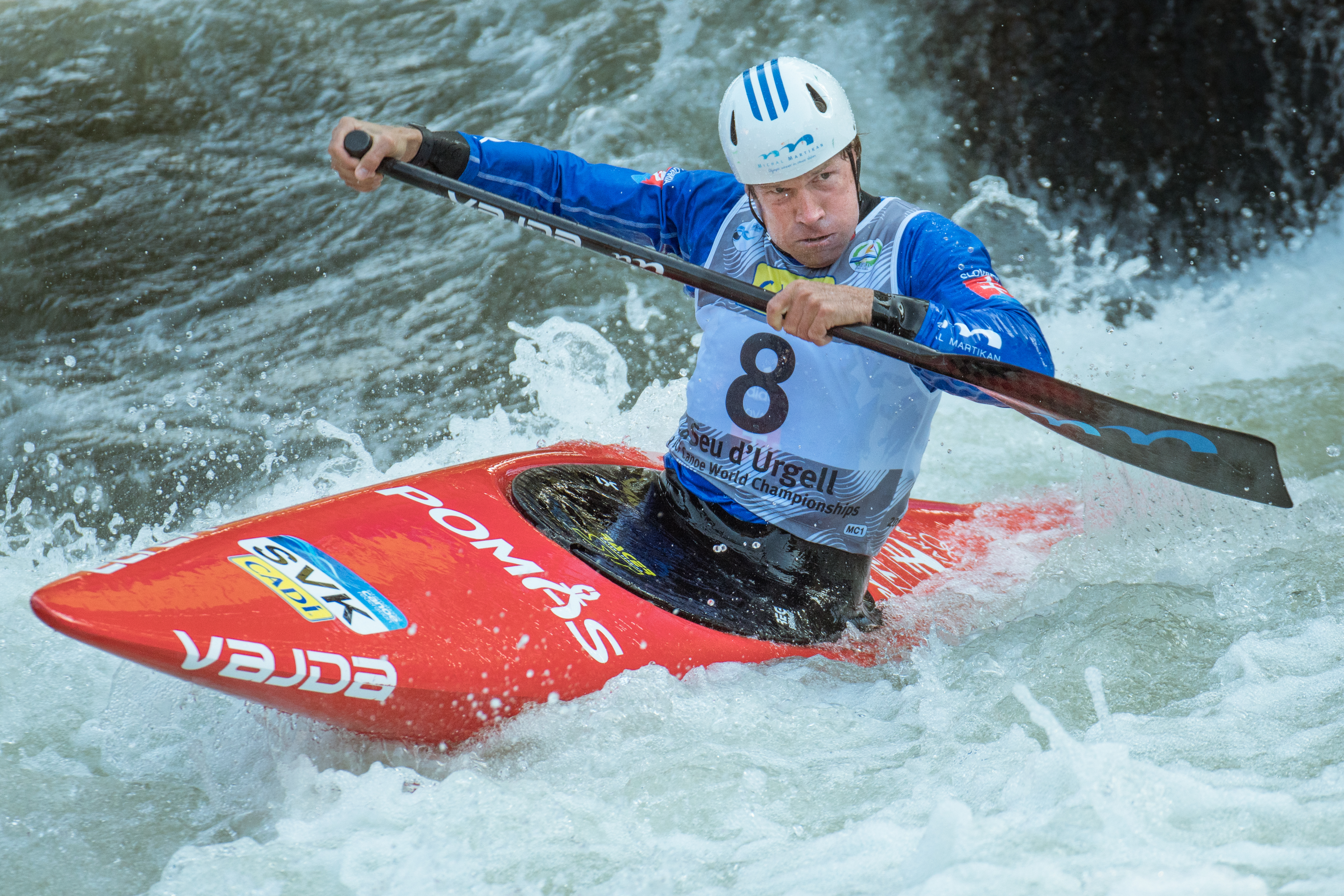
- Martikán in 2019

Personal information
- Nationality: Slovak
- Born: 18 May 1979 (age 47) Liptovský Mikuláš, Czechoslovakia
- Height: 1.70 m (5 ft 7 in)
- Weight: 72 kg (159 lb)

Sport
- Country: Slovakia
- Sport: Canoe slalom
- Event: C1
- Club: KTK Dukla Liptovský Mikuláš
Medal record
Men's canoe slalom
Event	1st	2nd	3rd
Olympic Games	2	2	1
World Championships	15	3	5
European Championships	15	6	4
Junior World Championships	1	2	0
Junior European Championships	3	0	0
Total	36	13	10
Representing Slovakia
Olympic Games
Gold medal – first place	1996 Atlanta	C1
Gold medal – first place	2008 Beijing	C1
Silver medal – second place	2000 Sydney	C1
Silver medal – second place	2004 Athens	C1
Bronze medal – third place	2012 London	C1
World Championships
Gold medal – first place	1997 Três Coroas	C1
Gold medal – first place	1997 Três Coroas	C1 team
Gold medal – first place	2002 Bourg St.-Maurice	C1
Gold medal – first place	2003 Augsburg	C1
Gold medal – first place	2003 Augsburg	C1 team
Gold medal – first place	2007 Foz do Iguaçu	C1
Gold medal – first place	2009 La Seu d'Urgell	C1 team
Gold medal – first place	2010 Tacen	C1 team
Gold medal – first place	2011 Bratislava	C1 team
Gold medal – first place	2013 Prague	C1 team
Gold medal – first place	2014 Deep Creek Lake	C1 team
Gold medal – first place	2015 London	C1 team
Gold medal – first place	2017 Pau	C1 team
Gold medal – first place	2018 Rio de Janeiro	C1 team
Gold medal – first place	2019 La Seu d'Urgell	C1 team
Silver medal – second place	2006 Prague	C1
Silver medal – second place	2009 La Seu d'Urgell	C1
Silver medal – second place	2010 Tacen	C1
Bronze medal – third place	1995 Nottingham	C1
Bronze medal – third place	1995 Nottingham	C1 team
Bronze medal – third place	1999 La Seu d'Urgell	C1
Bronze medal – third place	2005 Penrith	C1
Bronze medal – third place	2017 Pau	C1
European Championships
Gold medal – first place	1998 Roudnice nad Labem	C1 team
Gold medal – first place	2000 Mezzana	C1 team
Gold medal – first place	2002 Bratislava	C1 team
Gold medal – first place	2005 Tacen	C1 team
Gold medal – first place	2007 Liptovský Mikuláš	C1
Gold medal – first place	2007 Liptovský Mikuláš	C1 team
Gold medal – first place	2008 Kraków	C1
Gold medal – first place	2008 Kraków	C1 team
Gold medal – first place	2009 Nottingham	C1
Gold medal – first place	2010 Bratislava	C1
Gold medal – first place	2010 Bratislava	C1 team
Gold medal – first place	2012 Augsburg	C1 team
Gold medal – first place	2015 Markkleeberg	C1 team
Gold medal – first place	2016 Liptovský Mikuláš	C1 team
Gold medal – first place	2021 Ivrea	C1 team
Silver medal – second place	1998 Roudnice nad Labem	C1
Silver medal – second place	2006 L'Argentière-la-Bessée	C1
Silver medal – second place	2006 L'Argentière-la-Bessée	C1 team
Silver medal – second place	2014 Vienna	C1
Silver medal – second place	2016 Liptovský Mikuláš	C1
Silver medal – second place	2018 Prague	C1 team
Bronze medal – third place	2014 Vienna	C1 team
Bronze medal – third place	2017 Tacen	C1
Bronze medal – third place	2024 Tacen	C1 team
Bronze medal – third place	2025 Vaires-sur-Marne	C1 team
Junior World Championships
Gold medal – first place	1994 Wausau	C1
Silver medal – second place	1996 Lipno	C1
Silver medal – second place	1996 Lipno	C1 team
Junior European Championships
Gold medal – first place	1995 Liptovský Mikuláš	C1
Gold medal – first place	1995 Liptovský Mikuláš	C1 team
Gold medal – first place	1997 Nowy Sącz	C1

Michal Martikán (Slovak pronunciation: [ˈmixal ˈmartikaːn]; born 18 May 1979) is a Slovak slalom canoeist who has been competing at the international level since 1994. In 1996 he became the first athlete to win an Olympic gold medal for Slovakia since the country gained independence in 1993. In total he won 5 Olympic medals (2 golds, 2 silvers and 1 bronze), which is the most among all slalom paddlers. He has also won the World Championship title in the C1 individual category four times.

== Career ==
At the age of 16, Michal Martikán became the youngest winner of a World Cup slalom canoeing event. Three months later, at age 17, Martikán was in sixth place after the first run of the canoe slalom singles event at the 1996 Olympics. With nothing to lose, he went all out on the second run and just bettered the score of defending champion Lukáš Pollert of the Czech Republic. Martikán was the first Olympic champion to represent independent Slovakia. He entered the 2000 Olympics as the favourite, having consistently finished near the top in every major competition and in each World Cup series. At the Sydney Games, Martikán registered the best score in the qualifying round, but was only in fifth place after the first run of the final. In the second run, he paddled a perfect course and his time was the fastest of the round. He was able to move up to the silver medal position behind Tony Estanguet of France. Competing in his third Olympics in 2004, Martikán again led the qualifying round. He also earned the highest score in the semi-finals, which also served as the first run of the final. After the second run, it appeared that Martikán had regained the Olympic title, but the referees controversially decided to award him a two-second penalty which pushed him to second place, only 12 hundredths of a second behind Estanguet. Martikán regained the Olympic title at the 2008 games in Beijing. At the 2012 Summer Olympics in London Martikán took bronze. Michal Martikán is the only slalom canoeist to win five Olympic medals, one in each of the five games from 1996 through 2012.

At the World Championships, Martikán had an uninterrupted medal run in the individual C1 event between 1995 and 2010. The 2011 ICF Canoe Slalom World Championships saw him finish outside the medals for the first time in an Olympic or World Championship individual race in his career. Ironically, this failure came in front of a home crowd on the Čunovo course near Bratislava. However, he managed to win gold in the team event with his Slovak teammates to prolong his medal run. He won another six gold medals in the C1 team event between 2013 and 2019, making it 17 straight World Championships with a medal.

He won his first medals in 1995 when he was just 16. He took a bronze in the C1 event and another bronze in the C1 team event. In 1997 he won his first individual world title as well as team gold. He won the individual C1 event on three more occasions (2002, 2003 and 2007). As of 2019 he has a total of 23 World Championship medals (15 golds, 3 silvers and 5 bronzes) which is more than any other slalom paddler in any category.

He has also won the overall World Cup title five times (1998, 2000, 2001, 2006, 2014), which is a record among C1 paddlers.

At the European Championships he has won four straight individual golds between 2007 and 2010. Slovakia won the C1 team event 11 times with him in the team. He also has 6 silvers (4 individual and 2 in team event) and 4 bronzes (1 individual and 3 in the team event).

Martikán is coached by his father Jozef.

=== Major championships results timeline ===
Event		1995	1996	1997	1998	1999	2000	2001	2002	2003	2004	2005	2006	2007	2008	2009	2010
Olympic Games	C1	Not held	1	Not held			2	Not held			2	Not held			1	Not held	
World Championships	C1	3	Not held	1	Not held	3	Not held		1	1	Not held	3	2	1	Not held	2	2
World Championships	C1 team	3	Not held	1	Not held	6	Not held		4	1	Not held	—	4	9	Not held	1	1
European Championships	C1	Not held	5	Not held	2	Not held	4	Not held	5	Not held	—	5	2	1	1	1	1
European Championships	C1 team	Not held	6	Not held	1	Not held	1	Not held	1	Not held	—	1	2	1	1	8	1

Event		2011	2012	2013	2014	2015	2016	2017	2018	2019	2020	2021	2022	2023	2024	2025
Olympic Games	C1	Not held	3	Not held			—	Not held				—	Not held		—	Not held
World Championships	C1	7	Not held	18	12	10	Not held	3	6	29	Not held	—	—	—	Not held	10
World Championships	C1 team	1	Not held	1	1	1	Not held	1	1	1	Not held	—	—	—	Not held	9
European Championships	C1	25	8	—	2	18	2	3	20	11	—	7	—	—	15	8
European Championships	C1 team	4	1	—	3	1	1	6	2	4	—	1	—	—	3	3

=== World Cup individual podiums ===
	1st place, gold medalist(s)	2nd place, silver medalist(s)	3rd place, bronze medalist(s)	Total
C1	20	10	13	43

Season	Date	Venue	Position	Event
1995	2 July 1995	Tacen	2nd	C1
1996	21 April 1996	Ocoee	1st	C1
1996	16 June 1996	Augsburg	3rd	C1
1997	6 July 1997	Bratislava	1st	C1
1998	21 June 1998	Tacen	1st	C1
1998	28 June 1998	Augsburg	3rd	C1
1998	13 September 1998	La Seu d'Urgell	1st	C1
1999	15 August 1999	Bratislava	3rd	C1
1999	22 August 1999	Augsburg	1st	C1
1999	3 October 1999	Penrith	2nd	C1
2000	30 April 2000	Penrith	1st	C1
2000	9 July 2000	La Seu d'Urgell	1st	C1
2000	30 July 2000	Augsburg	2nd	C1
2001	10 June 2001	Tacen	1st	C1
2001	29 July 2001	Augsburg	3rd	C1
2001	9 September 2001	Wausau	1st	C1
2002	21 July 2002	Augsburg	3rd	C1
2002	28 July 2002	Tacen	1st	C1
2003	11 May 2003	Penrith	3rd	C1
2003	6 July 2003	La Seu d'Urgell	1st	C1
2003	3 August 2003	Bratislava	2nd	C1
2004	23 April 2004	Athens	2nd	C1
2004	11 July 2004	Prague	3rd	C1
2004	25 July 2004	Bourg St.-Maurice	3rd	C1
2005	1 October 2005	Penrith	3rd	C1^{1}
2006	28 May 2006	Athens	1st	C1
2006	4 June 2006	Augsburg	2nd	C1
2006	11 June 2006	La Seu d'Urgell	3rd	C1
2006	2 July 2006	L'Argentière-la-Bessée	2nd	C1^{2}
2006	6 August 2006	Prague	2nd	C1^{1}
2007	30 June 2007	Prague	2nd	C1
2007	8 July 2007	Tacen	1st	C1
2008	16 March 2008	Penrith	1st	C1^{3}
2009	5 July 2009	Bratislava	1st	C1
2011	9 July 2011	Markkleeberg	1st	C1
2013	24 August 2013	Bratislava	1st	C1
2014	7 June 2014	Lee Valley	3rd	C1
2014	14 June 2014	Tacen	2nd	C1
2014	21 June 2014	Prague	1st	C1
2014	2 August 2014	La Seu d'Urgell	3rd	C1
2015	4 July 2015	Liptovský Mikuláš	1st	C1
2017	2 July 2017	Markkleeberg	1st	C1
2024	21 September 2024	La Seu d'Urgell	3rd	C1

^{1} World Championship counting for World Cup points
^{2} European Championship counting for World Cup points
^{3} Oceania Championship counting for World Cup points

== Awards ==
- Slovak Sportsperson of the Year: 1996, 1997, 2007, 2008
- Inducted into the Whitewater Hall of Fame: 2010.

== Manslaughter conviction ==
In November 1997 Martikán was involved in a car accident near the village of Velké Zálužie, Slovakia. The car he was driving hit a pedestrian causing him fatal injuries. The investigation concluded that Martikán was traveling substantially over the 40 km/h speed limit. It was also found that the killed man was highly intoxicated at the time of the accident, in dark outside the inhabited area.

With Martikán facing actual incarceration due to the violation of his probation terms (during his Australia's training camp he should process the license returning, a day after returning home while picking up the letter from the post office about driving license returning, the police surprisingly wait for him outside the building and he got in troubles...), then-president Rudolf Schuster, amid grave criticism, granted Martikán a presidential pardon, which besides sparing him from jail time effectively meant removal of the conviction from his criminal record. Schuster argued that Martikán's positive athletic representation of the country abroad warranted the pardon, while critics pointed to the double standard and the preferential treatment Martikán was receiving as a sport celebrity.

== See also ==
- List of multiple Olympic medalists in one event
- List of multiple Summer Olympic medalists

Awards
Preceded by Martina Moravcová; Radoslav Židek	Sportsperson of Slovakia; 1996, 1997; 2007, 2008	Succeeded by Martina Moravcová; Peter Hochschorner/Pavol Hochschorner
Olympic Games
Preceded by Slavomír Kňazovický	Flagbearer for Slovakia; Athens 2004	Succeeded by Elena Kaliská
