= Tony Estanguet =

French canoeist (born 1978)

Tony Estanguet OLY
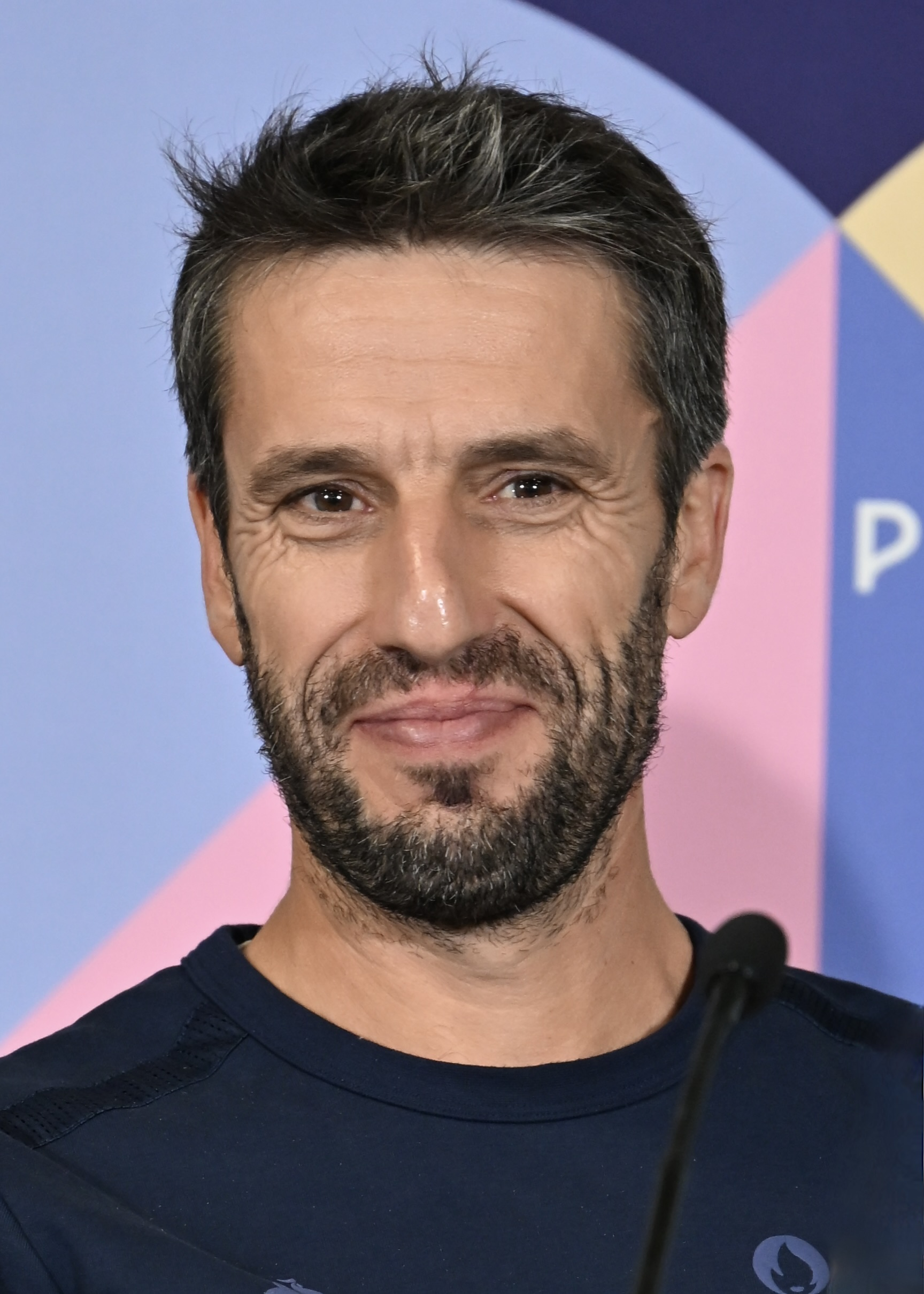
- Estanguet in 2024

Personal information
- Born: 6 May 1978 (age 48) Pau, France
- Height: 1.86 m (6 ft 1 in)
- Weight: 75 kg (165 lb)

President of the Paris Organising Committee of the Olympic and Paralympic Games
- In office 8 August 2021 – 11 August 2024
- IOC President: Thomas Bach
- Preceded by: Seiko Hashimoto (Tokyo 2020)
- Succeeded by: Casey Wasserman (Los Angeles 2028)

Chairman of the Paris Organising Committee of the Olympic and Paralympic Games
- In office 5 February 2018 – 8 September 2024
- Preceded by: Committee established
- Succeeded by: Committee dissolved

Sport
- Country: France
- Sport: Canoe slalom
- Event: C1
- Retired: 2012
Medal record
Men's canoe slalom
Event	1st	2nd	3rd
Olympic Games	3	0	0
World Championships	5	6	1
European Championships	4	3	3
Junior World Championships	0	1	1
Junior European Championships	0	1	1
Total	12	11	6
Representing France
Olympic Games
Gold medal – first place	2000 Sydney	C1
Gold medal – first place	2004 Athens	C1
Gold medal – first place	2012 London	C1
World Championships
Gold medal – first place	2005 Penrith	C1 team
Gold medal – first place	2006 Prague	C1
Gold medal – first place	2007 Foz do Iguaçu	C1 team
Gold medal – first place	2009 La Seu d'Urgell	C1
Gold medal – first place	2010 Tacen	C1
Silver medal – second place	1997 Três Coroas	C1 team
Silver medal – second place	2003 Augsburg	C1
Silver medal – second place	2003 Augsburg	C1 team
Silver medal – second place	2005 Penrith	C1
Silver medal – second place	2007 Foz do Igauçu	C1
Silver medal – second place	2009 La Seu d'Urgell	C1 team
Bronze medal – third place	1999 La Seu d'Urgell	C1 team
European Championships
Gold medal – first place	2000 Mezzana	C1
Gold medal – first place	2006 L'Argentière-la-Bessée	C1
Gold medal – first place	2011 La Seu d'Urgell	C1
Gold medal – first place	2011 La Seu d'Urgell	C1 team
Silver medal – second place	2002 Bratislava	C1
Silver medal – second place	2009 Nottingham	C1 team
Silver medal – second place	2012 Augsburg	C1
Bronze medal – third place	2007 Liptovský Mikuláš	C1 team
Bronze medal – third place	2010 Bratislava	C1 team
Bronze medal – third place	2012 Augsburg	C1 team
Junior World Championships
Silver medal – second place	1994 Wausau	C1 team
Bronze medal – third place	1996 Lipno	C1 team
Junior European Championships
Silver medal – second place	1995 Liptovský Mikuláš	C1
Bronze medal – third place	1995 Liptovský Mikuláš	C1 team

Tony Estanguet (French pronunciation: [ɛstɑ̃gɛ]; born 6 May 1978 in Pau) is a French slalom canoeist and a three-time Olympic champion in C1 (canoe single). He competed at the international level from 1994 to 2012.

He successfully led Paris's bid for the 2024 Summer Olympics and served as the head of the organising committee for those games.

== Racing career ==
Estanguet won three Olympic gold medals in the C1 event in 2000, 2004 and 2012. At the 2004 games in Athens he won the gold medal after a late judges decision to award a 2-second penalty to Michal Martikán, for which he was promoted to the rank of Commander in the Ordre national du Mérite, having been inducted as a Chevalier ('Knight') in the order in 2000.

Estanguet was the flag-bearer for France at the 2008 Beijing Summer Olympics opening ceremony. He finished in the 9th position (out of 12 competitors; only the first eight would qualify for the final) in the semi-finals of the C1 event and was thus eliminated from the final.

At the 2012 London Summer Olympics, he became the first French Olympian to win three gold medals in the same Olympic discipline. He was promoted to the rank of Officer of the Legion of Honour on 31 December 2012, having been inducted as a Chevalier in 2000.

He won 12 medals at the ICF Canoe Slalom World Championships with five golds (C1: 2006, 2009, 2010; C1 team: 2005, 2007), six silvers (C1: 2003, 2005, 2007; C1 team: 1997, 2003, 2009), and a bronze (C1 team: 1999).

Estanguet won the overall World Cup title in C1 in 2003 and 2004. He also won a total of 10 medals at the European Championships (4 golds, 3 silvers and 3 bronzes).

Together with his brother Patrice, he developed the Pau-Pyrénées Whitewater Stadium (opened in 2008) in their home town of Pau.

He announced his retirement on 30 November 2012.

== Post-racing career ==
In 2012, Estanguet was elected to the IOC Athletes' Commission. He served as an IOC member for eight years. In 2016, he was appointed to lead the Paris effort to host the 2024 Summer Olympics. The Paris bid proved successful, and Estanguet served as the head of the organizing committee for those Games.

== Personal life ==
Estanguet graduated from French business school ESSEC, specializing in sports marketing.

Tony is the son of Henri Estanguet, himself a canoeist who won medals at the Wildwater Canoe World Championships in the 1970s. His older brother Patrice won a bronze medal at the 1996 Summer Olympics in Atlanta.

== World Cup individual podiums ==
	1st place, gold medalist(s)	2nd place, silver medalist(s)	3rd place, bronze medalist(s)	Total
C1	18	3	6	27

Season	Date	Venue	Position	Event
1996	25 Aug 1996	Prague	1st	C1
1997	3 Aug 1997	Minden	1st	C1
1999	20 Jun 1999	Tacen	3rd	C1
2000	30 Apr 2000	Penrith	3rd	C1
2000	2 Jul 2000	Saint-Pé-de-Bigorre	1st	C1
2000	9 Jul 2000	La Seu d'Urgell	3rd	C1
2000	23 Jul 2000	Prague	1st	C1
2002	26 May 2002	Guangzhou	1st	C1
2003	31 Jul 2003	Bratislava	1st	C1
2003	3 Aug 2003	Bratislava	1st	C1
2004	23 Apr 2004	Athens	1st	C1
2004	23 May 2004	La Seu d'Urgell	1st	C1
2004	11 Jul 2004	Prague	1st	C1
2004	25 Jul 2004	Bourg St.-Maurice	1st	C1
2005	17 Jul 2005	Augsburg	3rd	C1
2005	24 Jul 2005	La Seu d'Urgell	1st	C1
2005	1 Oct 2005	Penrith	2nd	C1^{1}
2006	2 Jul 2006	L'Argentière-la-Bessée	1st	C1^{2}
2006	6 Aug 2006	Prague	1st	C1^{1}
2007	18 Mar 2007	Foz do Iguaçu	1st	C1^{3}
2008	21 Jun 2008	Prague	1st	C1
2009	12 Jul 2009	Augsburg	1st	C1
2010	27 Jun 2010	La Seu d'Urgell	2nd	C1
2010	4 Jul 2010	Augsburg	2nd	C1
2011	9 Jul 2011	Markkleeberg	3rd	C1
2012	16 Jun 2012	Pau	1st	C1
2012	23 Jun 2012	La Seu d'Urgell	3rd	C1

^{1} World Championship counting for World Cup points
^{2} European Championship counting for World Cup points
^{3} Pan American Championship counting for World Cup points

Olympic Games
Preceded by Jackson Richardson	Flagbearer for France; Beijing 2008	Succeeded by Laura Flessel

Sporting positions
Preceded by (Japan) Seiko Hashimoto	President of Organizing Committee for Summer Olympic Games; 2024	Succeeded by (United States) Casey Wasserman
