= Christian Bahmann =

German slalom canoeist (born 1981)

Medal record

Men's canoe slalom

Representing Germany

World Championships
Gold medal – first place	2005 Penrith	C2

European Championships
Silver medal – second place	2005 Tacen	C2 team
Bronze medal – third place	2008 Kraków	C1 team

U23 European Championships
Bronze medal – third place	2002 Bratislava	C1

Junior European Championships
Gold medal – first place	1999 Solkan	C1 team

Christian Bahmann (born 22 July 1981 in Plauen) is a German slalom canoeist who competed at the international level from 1999 to 2008.

He won a gold in the C2 event at the 2005 ICF Canoe Slalom World Championships in Penrith. He also won a silver and a bronze at the European Championships.

Bahmann finished fourth in the C2 event at the 2004 Summer Olympics together with former Olympic bronze medalist Michael Senft.

Christian Bahmann is the son of Angelika Bahmann, winner of the women's K1 event at the 1972 Summer Olympics in Munich.

== World Cup individual podiums ==
Season	Date	Venue	Position	Event
2004	25 April 2004	Athens	3rd	C2
2004	23 May 2004	La Seu d'Urgell	2nd	C2
2004	11 July 2004	Prague	3rd	C2
2004	17 July 2004	Augsburg	3rd	C2
2005	16 July 2005	Augsburg	2nd	C2
2005	2 October 2005	Penrith	1st	C2^{1}

^{1} World Championship counting for World Cup points
