= Ondřej Štěpánek =

Czech slalom canoeist (born 1979)

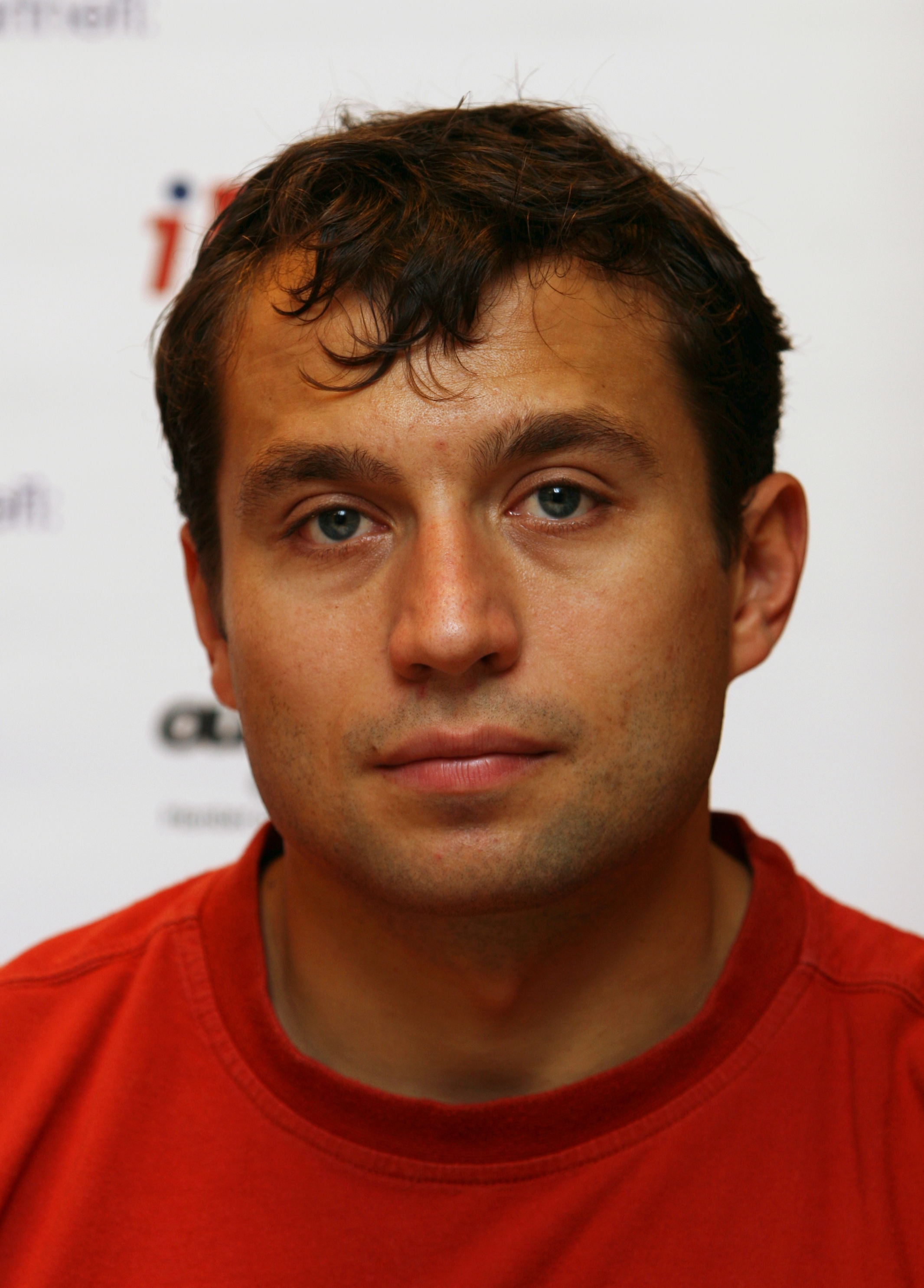
- Ondřej Štěpánek

Personal information
- Born: 28 November 1979 (age 46) Brandýs nad Labem, Czechoslovakia
- Height: 1.73 m (5 ft 8 in)
- Weight: 78 kg (172 lb)

Sport
- Country: Czech Republic
- Sport: Canoe slalom
- Event: C2
- Retired: 2013
Medal record
Men's canoe slalom
Event	1st	2nd	3rd
Olympic Games	0	1	1
World Championships	6	3	0
European Championships	6	5	2
Junior World Championships	2	0	1
Total	14	9	4
Representing Czech Republic
Olympic Games
Silver medal – second place	2008 Beijing	C2
Bronze medal – third place	2004 Athens	C2
World Championships
Gold medal – first place	1999 La Seu d'Urgell	C2 team
Gold medal – first place	2003 Augsburg	C2 team
Gold medal – first place	2006 Prague	C2
Gold medal – first place	2006 Prague	C2 team
Gold medal – first place	2007 Foz do Iguaçu	C2 team
Gold medal – first place	2013 Prague	C2 team
Silver medal – second place	2003 Augsburg	C2
Silver medal – second place	2010 Tacen	C2 team
Silver medal – second place	2013 Prague	C2
European Championships
Gold medal – first place	1998 Roudnice nad Labem	C2 team
Gold medal – first place	2004 Skopje	C2
Gold medal – first place	2005 Tacen	C2
Gold medal – first place	2009 Nottingham	C2 team
Gold medal – first place	2010 Bratislava	C2 team
Gold medal – first place	2012 Augsburg	C2
Silver medal – second place	1998 Roudnice nad Labem	C2
Silver medal – second place	2007 Liptovský Mikuláš	C2
Silver medal – second place	2007 Liptovský Mikuláš	C2 team
Silver medal – second place	2010 Bratislava	C2
Silver medal – second place	2012 Augsburg	C2 team
Bronze medal – third place	2002 Bratislava	C2
Bronze medal – third place	2006 L'Argentière-la-Bessée	C2 team
Junior World Championships
Gold medal – first place	1996 Lipno	C2
Gold medal – first place	1996 Lipno	C2 team
Bronze medal – third place	1994 Wausau	C2

Ondřej Štěpánek (Czech pronunciation: [ˈondr̝ɛj ˈʃcɛpaːnɛk]) (born 28 November 1979 in Brandýs nad Labem) is a Czech slalom canoeist who competed at the international level from 1994 to 2013. Competing in four Summer Olympics, he won two medals in the C2 event with a silver in 2008 and a bronze in 2004.

Štěpánek also won nine medals at the ICF Canoe Slalom World Championships with six golds (C2: 2006; C2 team: 1999, 2003, 2006, 2007, 2013) and three silvers (C2: 2003, 2013; C2 team: 2010).

He is the overall World Cup champion in C2 from 2005. He also won a total of 13 medals at the European Championships (6 golds, 5 silvers and 2 bronzes).

His partner in the C2 boat throughout the whole of his career was Jaroslav Volf.

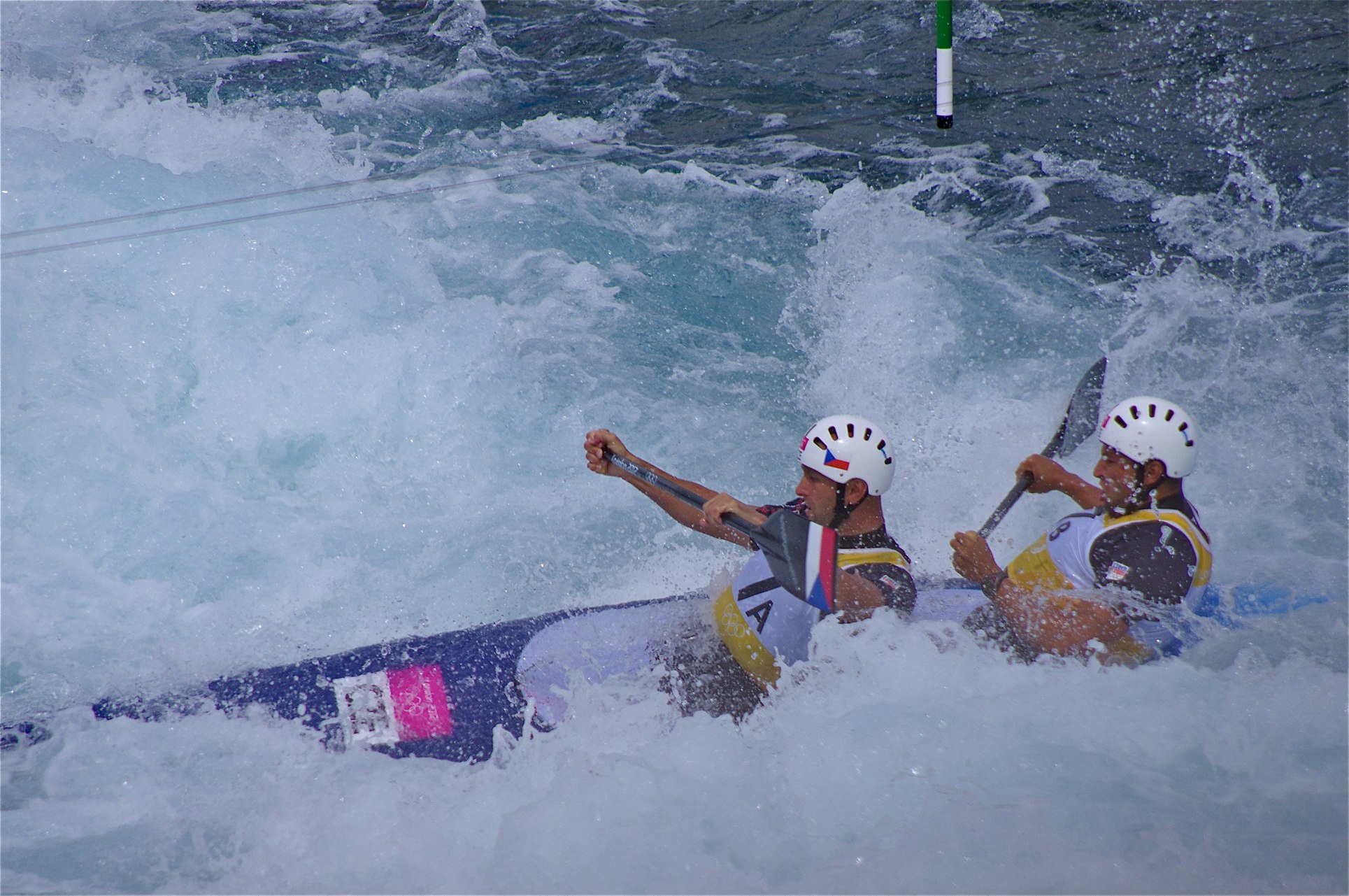
Ondřej Štěpánek (right) & Jaroslav Volf at the 2012 Summer Olympics

== World Cup individual podiums ==
	1st place, gold medalist(s)	2nd place, silver medalist(s)	3rd place, bronze medalist(s)	Total
C2	7	6	2	15

Season	Date	Venue	Position	Event
1998	14 June 1998	Liptovský Mikuláš	2nd	C2
1999	24 June 1999	Tacen	2nd	C2
2000	23 July 2000	Prague	3rd	C2
2002	4 August 2002	Prague	1st	C2
2003	31 July 2003	Bratislava	2nd	C2
2004	25 April 2004	Athens	1st	C2
2004	17 July 2004	Augsburg	1st	C2
2005	26 June 2005	Tacen	1st	C2^{1}
2005	10 July 2005	Athens	1st	C2
2005	24 July 2005	La Seu d'Urgell	2nd	C2
2006	3 June 2006	Augsburg	2nd	C2
2006	5 August 2006	Prague	1st	C2^{2}
2007	18 March 2007	Foz do Iguaçu	1st	C2^{3}
2009	11 July 2009	Augsburg	3rd	C2
2010	27 June 2010	La Seu d'Urgell	2nd	C2

^{1} European Championship counting for World Cup points
^{2} World Championship counting for World Cup points
^{3} Pan American Championship counting for World Cup points
