= Peggy Dickens =

French slalom canoeist

Medal record

Women's canoe slalom

Representing France

World Championships
Bronze medal – third place	2005 Penrith	K1

Peggy Dickens (born 8 December 1975 in Schiltigheim) is a French slalom canoeist who competed from the early 1990s to the mid-2000s. She won a bronze medal in the K1 event at the 2005 ICF Canoe Slalom World Championships in Penrith.

Dickens also finished fourth in the K1 event at the 2004 Summer Olympics in Athens.

== Biography ==
Peggy Dickens finished fourth in the single kayak slalom final at the 2004 Summer Olympics in Athens. She won the bronze medal in the single kayak event at the 2005 World Canoe Slalom Championships in Penrith, New South Wales.

== World Cup individual podiums ==
Season	Date	Venue	Position	Event
1998	2 Aug 1998	Wausau	3rd	K1
2001	27 May 2001	Goumois	3rd	K1
2004	25 Jul 2004	Bourg St.-Maurice	2nd	K1
2005	17 Jul 2005	Augsburg	3rd	K1
2005	1 Oct 2005	Penrith	3rd	K1^{1}

^{1} World Championship counting for World Cup points

== Bibliography ==
- Sports-reference.com profile
- Yahoo! Athens 2004 Sports profile
