= Julien Billaut =

French slalom canoeist

Medal record

Men's canoe slalom

Representing France

World Championships
Gold medal – first place	2005 Penrith	K1 team
Gold medal – first place	2006 Prague	K1
Gold medal – first place	2006 Prague	K1 team
Silver medal – second place	2007 Foz do Iguaçu	K1 team

European Championships
Gold medal – first place	2004 Skopje	K1
Bronze medal – third place	2009 Nottingham	K1
Bronze medal – third place	2009 Nottingham	K1 team

Junior World Championships
Bronze medal – third place	1998 Lofer	K1 team

Junior European Championships
Silver medal – second place	1999 Solkan	K1 team

Julien Billaut (born 26 November 1981) is a French slalom canoeist who competed at the international level from 1998 to 2009.

Billaut won four medals at the ICF Canoe Slalom World Championships, with three golds (K1: 2006, K1 team: 2005, 2006) and a silver (K1 team: 2007). He also won 1 gold and 2 bronzes at the European Championships.

== World Cup individual podiums ==
Season	Date	Venue	Position	Event
2003	6 Jul 2003	La Seu d'Urgell	3rd	K1
2003	3 Aug 2003	Bratislava	1st	K1
2006	5 Aug 2006	Prague	1st	K1^{1}

^{1} World Championship counting for World Cup points
