= Peter Cibák =

Slovak slalom canoeist

Personal information
- Nationality: Slovak
- Born: 2 March 1981 (age 45) Liptovský Mikuláš, Czechoslovakia
- Height: 1.87 m (6 ft 2 in)
- Weight: 77 kg (170 lb)

Sport
- Country: Slovakia
- Sport: Canoe slalom
- Event: K1
Medal record
Men's canoe slalom
Representing Slovakia
World Championships
Bronze medal – third place	2005 Penrith	K1
European Championships
Bronze medal – third place	2002 Bratislava	K1
Bronze medal – third place	2002 Bratislava	K1 team
Junior World Championships
Bronze medal – third place	1998 Lofer	K1
Junior European Championships
Silver medal – second place	1997 Nowy Sącz	K1 team

Peter Cibák (born 2 March 1981) is a Slovak slalom canoeist who competed at the international level from 1996 to 2010, specializing in the K1 discipline.

He won a bronze medal in the K1 event at the 2005 ICF Canoe Slalom World Championships in Penrith, becoming the first Slovak paddler to win an individual K1 medal at the World Championships. He also won two bronze medals at the 2002 European Championships in Bratislava (K1 and K1 team).

Cibák finished 12th in the K1 event at the 2008 Summer Olympics in Beijing after being eliminated in the semifinals in his only Olympic appearance.

Cibák was born in Liptovský Mikuláš. Ice hockey player Martin Cibák is his cousin. Ondrej Cibák, the whitewater course designer, was his grandfather.

== Career statistics ==
=== Major championships results timeline ===
Event		1997	1998	1999	2000	2001	2002	2003	2004	2005	2006	2007	2008	2009
Olympic Games	K1	Not held			—	Not held			—	Not held			12	Not held
World Championships	K1	33	Not held	23	Not held		87	31	Not held	3	9	41	Not held	12
World Championships	K1 team	6	Not held	4	Not held		6	24	Not held	4	7	8	Not held	14
European Championships	K1	Not held	—	Not held	22	Not held	3	Not held	4	44	40	14	31	24
European Championships	K1 team	Not held	—	Not held	5	Not held	3	Not held	5	12	7	5	17	11

=== World Cup individual podiums ===
Season	Date	Venue	Position	Event
2001	10 Jun 2001	Tacen	2nd	K1
2003	11 May 2003	Penrith	3rd	K1
2005	2 Oct 2005	Penrith	3rd	K1^{1}

^{1} World Championship counting for World Cup points
