= Michael Kurt =

Swiss slalom canoeist (born 1980)

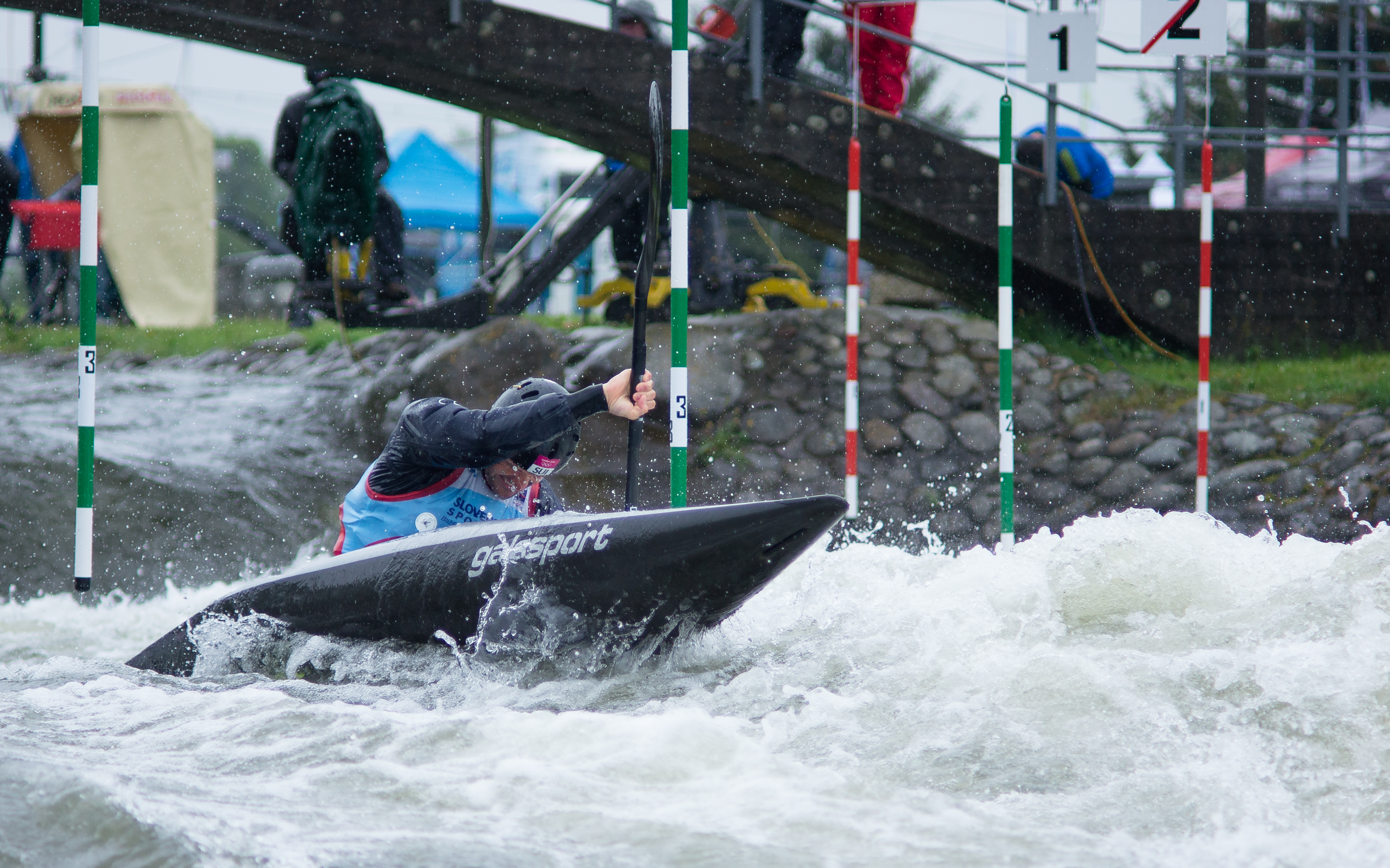
- Kurt at the 2016 European Championships

Personal information
- Born: 2 April 1980 (age 46) Wiedlisbach, Switzerland
- Height: 182 cm (6 ft 0 in)
- Weight: 80 kg (176 lb)

Sport
- Sport: Canoe slalom
- Club: Solothurner Kajakfahrer
Medal record
Representing Switzerland
World Championships
Gold medal – first place	2003 Augsburg	K1 team
European Championships
Gold medal – first place	2004 Skopje	K1 team
Silver medal – second place	2013 Kraków	K1
Bronze medal – third place	2000 Mezzana	K1 team
Bronze medal – third place	2008 Kraków	K1 team
Junior World Championships
Silver medal – second place	1998 Lofer	K1
Silver medal – second place	1998 Lofer	K1 team

Michael "Mike" Kurt (born 2 April 1980) is a Swiss slalom canoeist who competed at the international level from 1996 to 2016.

He won a gold medal in the K1 team event at the 2003 ICF Canoe Slalom World Championships in Augsburg. He also won four medals at the European Championships (1 gold, 1 silver and 2 bronzes).

At the 2004 Summer Olympics Kurt competed in the K1 event. He won the qualification round, and progressed to the semifinals. However, at this stage, he finished 20th out of 25. At the 2008 Summer Olympics he finished seventeenth in the qualification round of the K1 event, failing to progress to the semifinals. At the 2012 Summer Olympics he placed 13th in the K1 event after being eliminated in the semifinals.

He lives in Solothurn and is a co-founder and CEO of the crowdfunding platform www.ibelieveinyou.ch.

== World Cup individual podiums ==
Season	Date	Venue	Position	Event
2003	13 Jul 2003	Tacen	3rd	K1
2004	11 Jul 2004	Prague	2nd	K1
2007	18 Mar 2007	Foz do Iguaçu	2nd	K1^{1}
2007	14 Jul 2007	Augsburg	3rd	K1
2010	20 Jun 2010	Prague	3rd	K1
2010	27 Jun 2010	La Seu d'Urgell	2nd	K1

^{1} Pan American Championship counting for World Cup points
