= Helen Reeves (canoeist) =

British slalom canoeist (born 1980)

Medal record

Women's canoe slalom

Representing Great Britain

Olympic Games
Bronze medal – third place	2004 Athens	K1

World Championships
Bronze medal – third place	2002 Bourg St.-Maurice	K1 team
Bronze medal – third place	2003 Augsburg	K1 team

Junior World Championships
Gold medal – first place	1996 Lipno	K1

Helen Reeves (born 6 September 1980 in Fleet, Hampshire) is a British slalom canoeist who competed at the international level from 1996 to 2004.

She won a bronze medal in the K1 event at the 2004 Summer Olympics in Athens.

Reeves also won two bronze medals in the K1 team event at the ICF Canoe Slalom World Championships, earning them in 2002 and 2003.

Reeves, since retirement, has taken up commentating. For the BBC, Reeves has worked on canoeing events at Summer Olympic Games. At Beijing 2008, she worked alongside Garry Herbert and at London 2012 she was in commentary with Andrew Cotter and Paul Dickenson. For the Rio 2016, Tokyo 2020 and Paris 2024 Olympics, Reeves has commentated with Patrick Winterton.

== World Cup individual podiums ==
Season	Date	Venue	Position	Event
2004	23 May 2004	La Seu d'Urgell	1st	K1
