= 2010 ICF Canoe Slalom World Championships =

Canoe slalom event in Tacen, Slovenia

Logo of the 2010 ICF Canoe Slalom World Championships.

The 2010 ICF Canoe Slalom World Championships were held 8–12 September 2010 at Tacen Whitewater Course, Slovenia under the auspices of International Canoe Federation for the record-tying third time. It was the 33rd edition. Tacen hosted the event previously in 1955 and 1991 when it was part of Yugoslavia, and joins the following cities that have hosted the event three times: Spittal, Austria (1963, 1965, and 1977); Meran, Italy (1953, 1971, and 1983); Bourg St.-Maurice, France (1969, 1987, and 2002); and Augsburg, Germany (1957, 1985, and 2003). Women's single canoe (C1W) events became a medal event after being an exhibition in the previous championships.

Ten nations won medals at the championships, the most since the 2005 championships in Penrith. Slovakia was the big winner with five medals including three golds and two silvers. Men's canoe top medalists were Slovak Michal Martikán and France's Denis Gargaud Chanut and Fabien Lefèvre, each with two medals (one gold and one silver). Lefèvre became the first canoeist to medal in both canoe and kayak disciplines at the same championship while Jana Dukátová of Slovakia became the first woman to win gold in the C1 event and the first woman to medal in both canoe and kayak disciplines at the same championship. Dukátová won silver in the K1 women's event the day before. Italy's Daniele Molmenti won two medals in men's kayak with gold in K1 and bronze in K1 team.

Weather conditions forced schedule changes when flow from the River Sava increased water flow fivefold, resulting in course damage that delayed competition for nearly a day on 9 September.

== Event's corporate images ==
=== Event logo ===
The logo comprised elements connected to the sport and the event's organization. Main motif of two paddles that made up the letter X, which was the Roman numeral for 10 which is for 2010. It also is for the Roman Empire settlement of Emona, located in present-day Ljubljana, located near Tacen. The paddles in the middle of the boat are not connected deliberately to communicate both canoeing and kayaking.

Main motif is framed by a crest which comprises two lines. The bottom line is a copy of the boat in the transverse section while the top line is a copy of the boat in the vertical section. The crest carries a sense of nobility and that the sport in the past was connected with both townspeople and aristocrats along with environmental protection. Waves shown flanking the crest link the event's organizer with the ICF.

=== Short name ===
SLOKA has two names: SLalOm KAyak and Canoe Championships or SLOvene KAyak and canoe. It is acceptable in foreign languages that does not contain any special Slovene characters.

=== Slogan ===
The slogan Wild water, pure joy (Divja voda, čisti užitek is (in Slovene)) describes the essence of conquering the rapids refers to wild water and pleasure simultaneously. This slogan is in green and blue that combines water pleasures and ecology.

=== Mascot ===
The crawfish is a symbol of clean water and life in and around that water. It is also an independent and distinctive character to enhance the story of motion and vivacity that also evokes positive motions.

== Schedule ==
This was the schedule listed as of 15 August 2010. All times listed are CEST (UTC+2).

Event date	Starting time	Event details
7 September	16:00	Official team leaders team meeting
7 September	20:00	Opening ceremony
8 September	10:00	Demonstration run for heats
8 September	14:30	Heats C2 and K1W
9 September	10:00	Heats C1M and C1W
9 September	15:00	Heats K1M
9 September	20:00	Reception for team leaders and officials
10 September	10:00	Heats team events in all categories
10 September	15:00	Finals team events in all categories
10 September	16:40	Medal ceremonies for team events
10 September	18:00	Demonstration run for finals
10 September	20:00	VIP and Team Leaders reception
11 September	11:00	Semifinals C2 and K1W
11 September	14:30	Finals C2 and K1W
11 September	15:30	Medals presentation C2 and K1W
12 September	09:30	Semifinals C1M, C1W, and K1M
12 September	14:30	Finals C1M and C1W
12 September	15:25	Medal ceremony C1M and C1W
12 September	15:35	Finals K1M
12 September	16:10	Medal ceremony for K1M
12 September	16:30	Closing ceremony

K1 heats for 9 September were postponed due to the River Sava water flows exceeding 250 m^{3}/s (8,800 cu ft/s). K1 heats were moved to 10 September at 14:30. Two days earlier, the schedule was also revised for all individual events to flow along the river rising from a level of 50 to 250 m^{3}/s (1,800 to 8,800 cu ft/s).

A revised schedule was issued on 10 September. The C1W team event was canceled as a result of the schedule change.

Event date	Starting time	Event details
10 September	11:00	Team leaders meeting
10 September	14:30	Heats K1M
10 September	16:40	Officials meeting
10 September	20:00	VIP and Team Leaders reception
11 September	11:00	Semifinals C2 and K1W
11 September	14:30	Finals C2 and K1W
11 September	15:30	Medals presentation C2 and K1W
11 September	16:30	Team finals C2 and K1W
11 September	17:30	Medals presentation team C2 and K1W
12 September	09:30	Semifinals C1M, C1W, and K1M
12 September	14:30	Finals C1M, C1W, and K1M
12 September	16:00	Medal presentation C1W
12 September	16:30	Team finals C1M and K1M
12 September	17:45	Medal presentation C1M, K1M
12 September	18:00	Medal presentation team C1M, K1M
12 September	18:17	Closing ceremony

== Medal summary ==
=== Men's ===
==== Canoe ====
Event	Gold	Points	Silver	Points	Bronze	Points
C1	Tony Estanguet (FRA)	95.70	Michal Martikán (SVK)	98.61	Jordi Domenjó (ESP)	99.41
C1 team	Slovakia; Michal Martikán; Alexander Slafkovský; Matej Beňuš	105.34	Germany; Sideris Tasiadis; Jan Benzien; Franz Anton	106.71	Czech Republic; Stanislav Ježek; Jan Mašek; Michal Jáně	110.67
C2	Slovakia; Pavol Hochschorner; Peter Hochschorner	105.35	France; Denis Gargaud Chanut; Fabien Lefèvre	109.00	Great Britain; David Florence; Richard Hounslow	109.36
C2 team	France; Denis Gargaud Chanut & Fabien Lefèvre; Gauthier Klauss & Matthieu Péché; Pierre Picco & Hugo Biso	124.90	Czech Republic; Jaroslav Volf & Ondřej Štěpánek; Tomáš Koplík & Jakub Vrzáň; Lukáš Přinda & Jan Havlíček	125.70	Germany; Kai Müller & Kevin Müller; Robert Behling & Thomas Becker; David Schröder & Frank Henze	126.78

==== Kayak ====
Event	Gold	Points	Silver	Points	Bronze	Points
K1	Daniele Molmenti (ITA)	91.00	Vavřinec Hradilek (CZE)	91.56	Jure Meglič (SLO)	93.74
K1 team	Germany; Alexander Grimm; Fabian Dörfler; Hannes Aigner	101.80	France; Pierre Bourliaud; Boris Neveu; Fabien Lefèvre	102.92	Italy; Daniele Molmenti; Diego Paolini; Stefano Cipressi	103.55

=== Women's ===
==== Canoe ====
Event	Gold	Points	Silver	Points	Bronze	Points
C1	Jana Dukátová (SVK)	125.71	Leanne Guinea (AUS)	131.90	Jessica Fox (AUS)	134.18

==== Kayak ====
Event	Gold	Points	Silver	Points	Bronze	Points
K1	Corinna Kuhnle (AUT)	102.64	Jana Dukátová (SVK)	107.73	Violetta Oblinger-Peters (AUT)	110.06
K1 team	Czech Republic; Štěpánka Hilgertová; Irena Pavelková; Marie Řihošková	126.23	Germany; Jennifer Bongardt; Jasmin Schornberg; Melanie Pfeifer	131.42	Slovenia; Eva Terčelj; Nina Mozetič; Urša Kragelj	136.11

== Medal table ==
Rank	Nation	Gold	Silver	Bronze	Total
1	Slovakia (SVK)	3	2	0	5
2	France (FRA)	2	2	0	4
3	Czech Republic (CZE)	1	2	1	4
3	Germany (GER)	1	2	1	4
5	Austria (AUT)	1	0	1	2
5	Italy (ITA)	1	0	1	2
7	Australia (AUS)	0	1	1	2
8	Slovenia (SLO)	0	0	2	2
9	Great Britain (GBR)	0	0	1	1
9	Spain (ESP)	0	0	1	1
Totals (10 entries)		9	9	9	27
