= Robby Simon =

German slalom canoeist (born 1978)

Medal record

Men's canoe slalom

Representing Germany

World Championships
| Silver medal – second place | 2002 Bourg St.-Maurice | C2 team |
| Silver medal – second place | 2003 Augsburg | C2 team |
| Silver medal – second place | 2006 Prague | C2 team |
| Bronze medal – third place | 1997 Três Coroas | C2 team |

European Championships
| Gold medal – first place | 2006 L'Argentière-la-Bessée | C2 team |
| Gold medal – first place | 2007 Liptovský Mikuláš | C2 team |
| Gold medal – first place | 2008 Kraków | C2 team |
| Silver medal – second place | 2005 Tacen | C2 team |
| Bronze medal – third place | 2002 Bratislava | C2 team |
| Bronze medal – third place | 2006 L'Argentière-la-Bessée | C2 |

Junior World Championships
| Silver medal – second place | 1996 Lipno | C2 |

Junior European Championships
| Silver medal – second place | 1995 Liptovský Mikuláš | C2 |

Robby Simon (born 9 July 1978) is a German slalom canoeist who competed at the international level from 1995 to 2008.

He won four medals in the C2 team event at the ICF Canoe Slalom World Championships with three silvers (2002, 2003, 2006) and a bronze (1997). He won six more medals at the European Championships (3 golds, 1 silver and 2 bronzes).

His partner in the C2 boat throughout his career was his twin brother Kay Simon.

== World Cup individual podiums ==
| Season | Date | Venue | Position | Event |
|---|---|---|---|---|
| 2002 | 20 Jul 2002 | Augsburg | 3rd | C2 |
| 2004 | 23 May 2004 | La Seu d'Urgell | 3rd | C2 |
| 2004 | 30 May 2004 | Merano | 3rd | C2 |
| 2005 | 16 Jul 2005 | Augsburg | 3rd | C2 |
| 2006 | 11 Jun 2006 | La Seu d'Urgell | 3rd | C2 |
| 2006 | 2 Jul 2006 | L'Argentière-la-Bessée | 3rd | C2^{1} |
| 2008 | 5 Jul 2008 | Augsburg | 3rd | C2 |

^{1} European Championship counting for World Cup points
