= Stuart McIntosh =

British slalom canoeist (born 1975)

Medal record

Men's canoe slalom

Representing Great Britain

World Championships
Bronze medal – third place	2006 Prague	C1 team

European Championships
Bronze medal – third place	1998 Roudnice nad Labem	C1 team
Bronze medal – third place	2005 Tacen	C1

Stuart McIntosh (born 8 June 1975 in London) is a British slalom canoeist who competed in the 1990s and 2000s.

He won a bronze medal in the C1 team event at the 2006 ICF Canoe Slalom World Championships in Prague and two more bronze medals at the European Championships (1 individual and 1 in team event). He won four World Cup series medals, including a silver medal at the 2004 World Cup Final in Bourg St.-Maurice, France.

McIntosh also competed in two Summer Olympics in the C1 event, earning his best finish of eighth twice (2000, 2004). He was also a 'reserve' in 2008.

McIntosh moved to Australia after the end of his career. He has three children with his wife Melissa (née Grah), who was elected to the Australian parliament in 2019.

== World Cup individual podiums ==
Season	Date	Venue	Position	Event
2000	23 Jul 2000	Prague	3rd	C1
2001	9 Sep 2001	Wausau	3rd	C1
2004	25 Jul 2004	Bourg St.-Maurice	2nd	C1
2005	26 Jun 2005	Tacen	3rd	C1^{1}

^{1} European Championship counting for World Cup points
