= Jennifer Bongardt =

German slalom canoeist (born 1982)

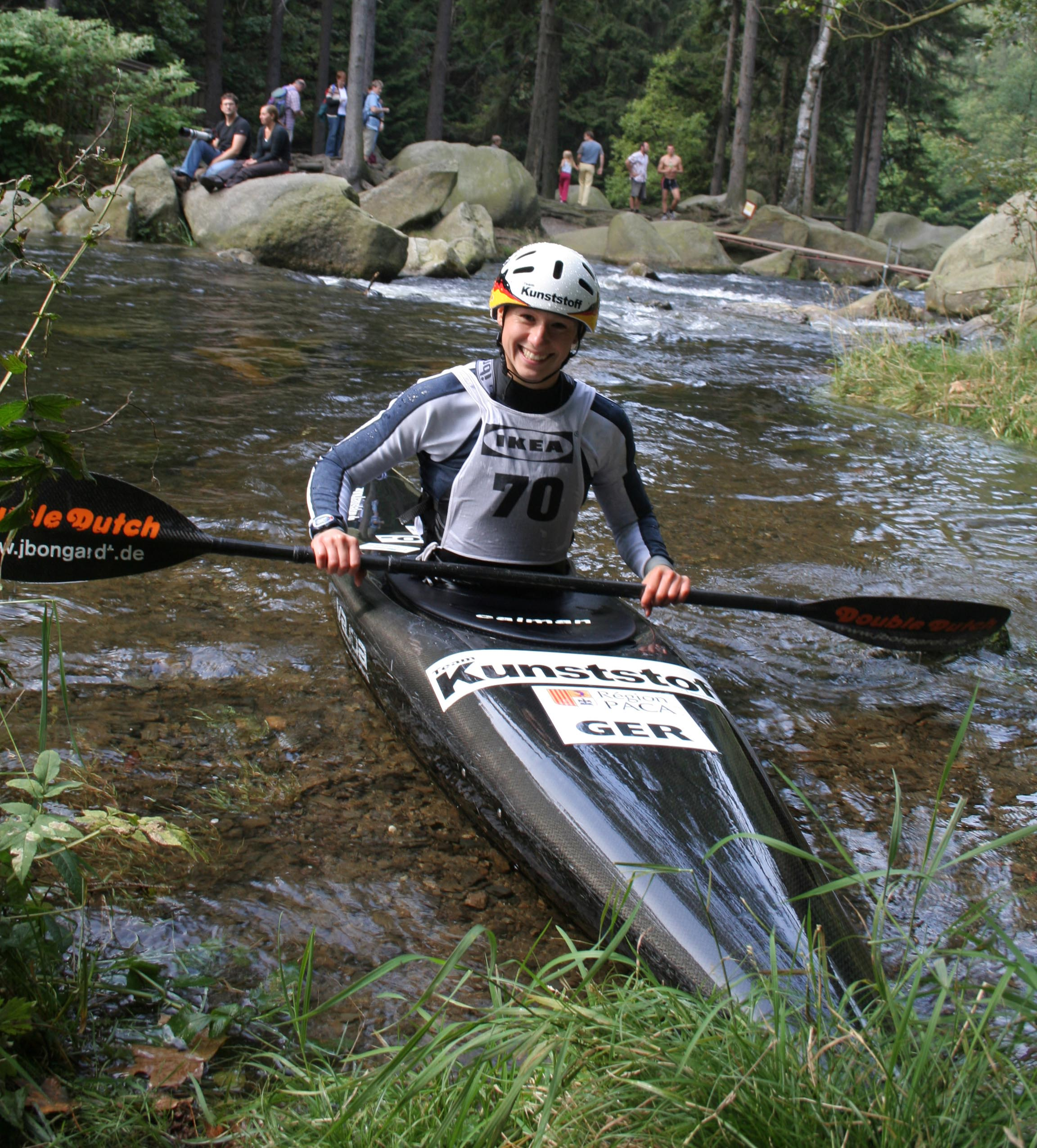
- Bongardt in 2006

Personal information
- Born: 8 September 1982 (age 43) Hagen-Dahl, West Germany
- Height: 1.68 m (5 ft 6 in)
- Weight: 63 kg (139 lb)

Sport
- Country: Germany
- Sport: Canoe slalom
- Event: K1
- Retired: 2010
Medal record
Women's canoe slalom
Representing Germany
World Championships
Gold medal – first place	2007 Foz do Iguaçu	K1
Gold medal – first place	2007 Foz do Iguaçu	K1 team
Silver medal – second place	2003 Augsburg	K1
Silver medal – second place	2003 Augsburg	K1 team
Silver medal – second place	2010 Tacen	K1 team
Bronze medal – third place	2006 Prague	K1
Bronze medal – third place	2006 Prague	K1 team
European Championships
Gold medal – first place	2007 Liptovský Mikuláš	K1 team
Gold medal – first place	2010 Bratislava	K1 team
Silver medal – second place	2006 L'Argentière-la-Bessée	K1
Bronze medal – third place	2009 Nottingham	K1 team
Junior World Championships
Gold medal – first place	2000 Bratislava	K1
Gold medal – first place	2000 Bratislava	K1 team
Silver medal – second place	1998 Lofer	K1 team
Junior European Championships
Gold medal – first place	1999 Solkan	K1
Bronze medal – third place	1999 Solkan	K1 team

Jennifer Bongardt (born 8 September 1982 in Hagen-Dahl) is a German slalom canoeist who competed at the international level from 1998 to 2010.

She won seven medals at the ICF Canoe Slalom World Championships with two golds (K1 and K1 team: both 2007), three silvers (K1: 2003, K1 team: 2003, 2010), and two bronzes (K1 and K1 team: both 2006). She also won four medals at the European Championships (2 golds, 1 silver and 1 bronze).

Bongardt competed in two Summer Olympics, earning her best finish of ninth in the K1 event in Athens in 2004.

== World Cup individual podiums ==
Season	Date	Venue	Position	Event
2006	11 Jun 2006	La Seu d'Urgell	1st	K1
2006	2 Jul 2006	L'Argentière-la-Bessée	2nd	K1^{1}
2006	6 Aug 2006	Prague	3rd	K1^{2}
2007	18 Mar 2007	Foz do Iguaçu	2nd	K1^{3}
2007	15 Jul 2007	Augsburg	1st	K1
2009	12 Jul 2009	Augsburg	3rd	K1
2010	4 Jul 2010	Augsburg	1st	K1

^{1} European Championship counting for World Cup points
^{2} World Championship counting for World Cup points
^{3} Pan American Championship counting for World Cup points
