= Heather Corrie =

British-born slalom canoeist

Medal record

Women's canoe slalom

Representing Great Britain

World Championships
Silver medal – second place	1995 Nottingham	K1 team
Silver medal – second place	2005 Penrith	K1 team
Bronze medal – third place	1997 Três Coroas	K1 team
Bronze medal – third place	1999 La Seu d'Urgell	K1 team
Bronze medal – third place	2002 Bourg St.-Maurice	K1 team
Bronze medal – third place	2003 Augsburg	K1 team

European Championships
Silver medal – second place	1998 Roudnice nad Labem	K1 team

Junior World Championships
Bronze medal – third place	1986 Spittal	K1

Heather Corrie (born 25 July 1971 near Manchester) is a British-born slalom canoeist who competed at the international level from 1986 to 2008.

She won six medals for Great Britain in the K1 team event at the ICF Canoe Slalom World Championships with two silvers (1995, 2005) and four bronzes (1997, 1999, 2002, 2003). She also won a silver medal in the same event at the 1998 European Championships in Roudnice nad Labem. Corrie won the pre-world championship event in 2001 in Bourg-Saint-Maurice, France.

Corrie, a dual national, competed for the United States in the K1 event at the 2008 Summer Olympics in Beijing where she finished eighth. She also won the US National Championships and the Pan American Championships in the same year.

== World Cup individual podiums ==
Season	Date	Venue	Position	Event
1997	3 Aug 1997	Minden	2nd	K1
2008	26 Apr 2008	Charlotte	1st	K1^{1}

^{1} Pan American Championship counting for World Cup points
