= 2005 ICF Canoe Slalom World Championships =

Canoe slalom event in Penrith, New South Wales, Australia

The 2005 ICF Canoe Slalom World Championships were held in Penrith, New South Wales, Australia at the Penrith Whitewater Stadium under the auspices of International Canoe Federation. It was the 29th edition. This marked the first time the events took place on the Australian continent on the venue that hosted the slalom canoeing event for the 2000 Summer Olympics in neighboring Sydney.

== Medal summary ==
=== Men's ===
==== Canoe ====
Event	Gold	Points	Silver	Points	Bronze	Points
C1	Robin Bell (AUS)	209.26	Tony Estanguet (FRA)	209.47	Michal Martikán (SVK)	210.64
C1 team	France; Olivier Lalliet; Pierre Labarelle; Tony Estanguet	229.47	Germany; Nico Bettge; Stefan Pfannmöller; Jan Benzien	229.90	Czech Republic; Tomáš Indruch; Jan Mašek; Stanislav Ježek	235.10
C2	Germany; Christian Bahmann; Michael Senft	224.40	Slovakia; Milan Kubáň; Marián Olejník	229.02	Germany; Marcus Becker; Stefan Henze	230.49
C2 team (non-medal event)	Germany; Christian Bahmann & Michael Senft; Kay Simon & Robby Simon; Marcus Becker & Stefan Henze	248.13	Czech Republic; Jaroslav Pospíšil & Jaroslav Pollert; Marek Jiras & Tomáš Máder; Jaroslav Volf & Ondřej Štěpánek	260.85	France; Remy Alonso & Victor Lamy; Philippe Quémerais & Yann Le Pennec; Cédric Forgit & Martin Braud	963.28

==== Kayak ====
Event	Gold	Points	Silver	Points	Bronze	Points
K1	Fabian Dörfler (GER)	201.35	Fabien Lefèvre (FRA)	204.09	Peter Cibák (SVK)	207.25
K1 team	France; Julien Billaut; Fabien Lefèvre; Benoît Peschier	218.49	Italy; Pierpaolo Ferrazzi; Matteo Pontarollo; Daniele Molmenti	222.08	Slovenia; Andrej Nolimal; Dejan Kralj; Peter Kauzer	223.45

=== Women's ===
==== Kayak ====
Event	Gold	Points	Silver	Points	Bronze	Points
K1	Elena Kaliská (SVK)	219.86	Mandy Planert (GER)	222.69	Peggy Dickens (FRA)	229.38
K1 team	Czech Republic; Irena Pavelková; Marcela Sadilová; Štěpánka Hilgertová	254.37	Great Britain; Heather Corrie; Kimberley Walsh; Laura Blakeman	260.57	Austria; Julia Schmid; Corinna Kuhnle; Violetta Oblinger-Peters	277.54

== Medal table ==
Rank	Nation	Gold	Silver	Bronze	Total
1	France (FRA)	2	2	1	5
1	Germany (GER)	2	2	1	5
3	Slovakia (SVK)	1	1	2	4
4	Czech Republic (CZE)	1	0	1	2
5	Australia (AUS)	1	0	0	1
6	Great Britain (GBR)	0	1	0	1
6	Italy (ITA)	0	1	0	1
8	Austria (AUT)	0	0	1	1
8	Slovenia (SLO)	0	0	1	1
Totals (9 entries)		7	7	7	21
