= Olivier Lalliet =

French canoeist

Medal record

Men's canoe slalom

Representing France

World Championships
Gold medal – first place	2005 Penrith	C1 team

Olivier Lalliet is a French slalom canoeist who competed in the 2000s. He won a gold medal in the C1 team event at the 2005 ICF Canoe Slalom World Championships in Penrith.

== World Cup individual podiums ==
Season	Date	Venue	Position	Event
2004	18 Jul 2004	Augsburg	3rd	C1
