= Kay Simon =

German slalom canoeist (born 1978)

Medal record

Men's canoe slalom

Representing Germany

World Championships
Silver medal – second place	2002 Bourg St.-Maurice	C2 team
Silver medal – second place	2003 Augsburg	C2 team
Silver medal – second place	2006 Prague	C2 team
Bronze medal – third place	1997 Três Coroas	C2 team

European Championships
Gold medal – first place	2006 L'Argentière-la-Bessée	C2 team
Gold medal – first place	2007 Liptovský Mikuláš	C2 team
Gold medal – first place	2008 Kraków	C2 team
Silver medal – second place	2005 Tacen	C2 team
Bronze medal – third place	2002 Bratislava	C2 team
Bronze medal – third place	2006 L'Argentière-la-Bessée	C2

Junior World Championships
Silver medal – second place	1996 Lipno	C2

Junior European Championships
Silver medal – second place	1995 Liptovský Mikuláš	C2

Kay Simon (born 9 July 1978) is a German slalom canoeist who competed at the international level from 1995 to 2008.

He won four medals in the C2 team event at the ICF Canoe Slalom World Championships with three silvers (2002, 2003, 2006) and a bronze (1997). He won six more medals at the European Championships (3 golds, 1 silver and 2 bronzes).

His partner in the C2 boat throughout his career was his twin brother Robby Simon.

== World Cup individual podiums ==
Season	Date	Venue	Position	Event
2002	20 Jul 2002	Augsburg	3rd	C2
2004	23 May 2004	La Seu d'Urgell	3rd	C2
2004	30 May 2004	Merano	3rd	C2
2005	16 Jul 2005	Augsburg	3rd	C2
2006	11 Jun 2006	La Seu d'Urgell	3rd	C2
2006	2 Jul 2006	L'Argentière-la-Bessée	3rd	C2^{1}
2008	5 Jul 2008	Augsburg	3rd	C2

^{1} European Championship counting for World Cup points
