= Canoeing at the 2004 Summer Olympics – Men's slalom C-1 =

These are the results of the men's C-1 slalom competition in canoeing at the 2004 Summer Olympics. The C-1 (canoe single) event is raced by one-man canoes through a whitewater course. The venue for the 2004 Olympic competition was the Olympic Canoe/Kayak Slalom Centre at the Helliniko Olympic Complex.

== Medalists ==
Gold	Silver	Bronze
Tony Estanguet (FRA)	Michal Martikán (SVK)	Stefan Pfannmöller (GER)

== Results ==
The 16 competitors each took two preliminary runs through the whitewater slalom course. The top 12 canoeists by combined time from the two runs advanced to the semifinal. The top 8 times from the single semifinal run determined the finalists. Ranking and medals were based on the combined time of the semifinal run and the final run. The preliminary runs were raced on August 17 and the semifinal and final runs were on August 18.

Rank	Name	Country	Preliminary Round				Semifinal		Final	
Rank	Name	Country	Run 1	Run 2	Total	Rank	Time	Rank	Time	Total
Gold	Tony Estanguet	France	99.23	102.30	201.53	2	93.37	2	95.79	189.16
Silver	Michal Martikán	Slovakia	103.51	97.93	201.44	1	93.25	1	96.03	189.28
Bronze	Stefan Pfannmöller	Germany	104.34	101.54	205.88	7	96.99	3	94.57	191.56
4	Robin Bell	Australia	100.11	112.57	212.68	12	97.48	4	95.35	192.83
5	Tomáš Indruch	Czech Republic	99.81	102.87	202.68	4	98.22	5	97.06	195.28
6	Simon Hočevar	Slovenia	104.17	105.18	209.35	9	100.24	8	99.54	199.78
7	Jordi Sangrá Gibert	Spain	108.48	104.06	212.54	11	99.84	6	100.57	200.41
8	Stuart McIntosh	Great Britain	99.87	102.87	202.74	5	100.08	7	111.11	211.19
9	James Cartwright	Canada	105.79	105.17	210.96	10	100.45	9		
10	Mariusz Wieczorek	Poland	103.14	98.66	201.80	3	101.30	10		
11	Ronnie Dürrenmatt	Switzerland	103.91	102.55	206.46	8	102.52	11		
12	Danko Herceg	Croatia	103.84	100.33	204.17	6	203.49	12		
13	Krzysztof Supowicz	Poland	107.26	109.94	217.20	13				
14	Nicolas Peschier	France	108.74	112.62	221.36	14				
15	Christos Tsakmakis	Greece	108.22	117.32	225.54	15				
16	Chris Ennis Jr.	United States	156.94	133.79	290.73	16				
