= Dejan Kralj =

Slovenian slalom canoeist (born 1976)

Medal record

Men's canoe slalom

Representing Slovenia

World Championships
Bronze medal – third place	2005 Penrith	K1 team

European Championships
Gold medal – first place	2005 Tacen	K1 team
Gold medal – first place	2006 L'Argentière-la-Bessée	K1 team
Gold medal – first place	2007 Liptovský Mikuláš	K1 team
Silver medal – second place	2000 Mezzana	K1 team
Bronze medal – third place	2010 Bratislava	K1 team

Junior World Championships
Gold medal – first place	1992 Sjoa	K1 team
Gold medal – first place	1994 Wausau	K1 team
Silver medal – second place	1992 Sjoa	K1
Bronze medal – third place	1994 Wausau	K1

Dejan Kralj (born 28 June 1976 in Ljubljana) is a Slovenian slalom canoeist who competed at the international level from 1992 to 2012.

He won a bronze medal in the K1 team event at the 2005 ICF Canoe Slalom World Championships in Penrith. He also won five medals in the same event at the European Championships (3 golds, 1 silver and 1 bronze).

Kralj finished tenth in the K1 event at the 2000 Summer Olympics in Sydney.

== World Cup individual podiums ==
Season	Date	Venue	Position	Event
2001	10 Jun 2001	Tacen	1st	K1
2001	9 Sep 2001	Wausau	3rd	K1
2006	11 Jun 2006	La Seu d'Urgell	3rd	K1
