= Stefano Cipressi =

Italian slalom canoeist (born 1982)

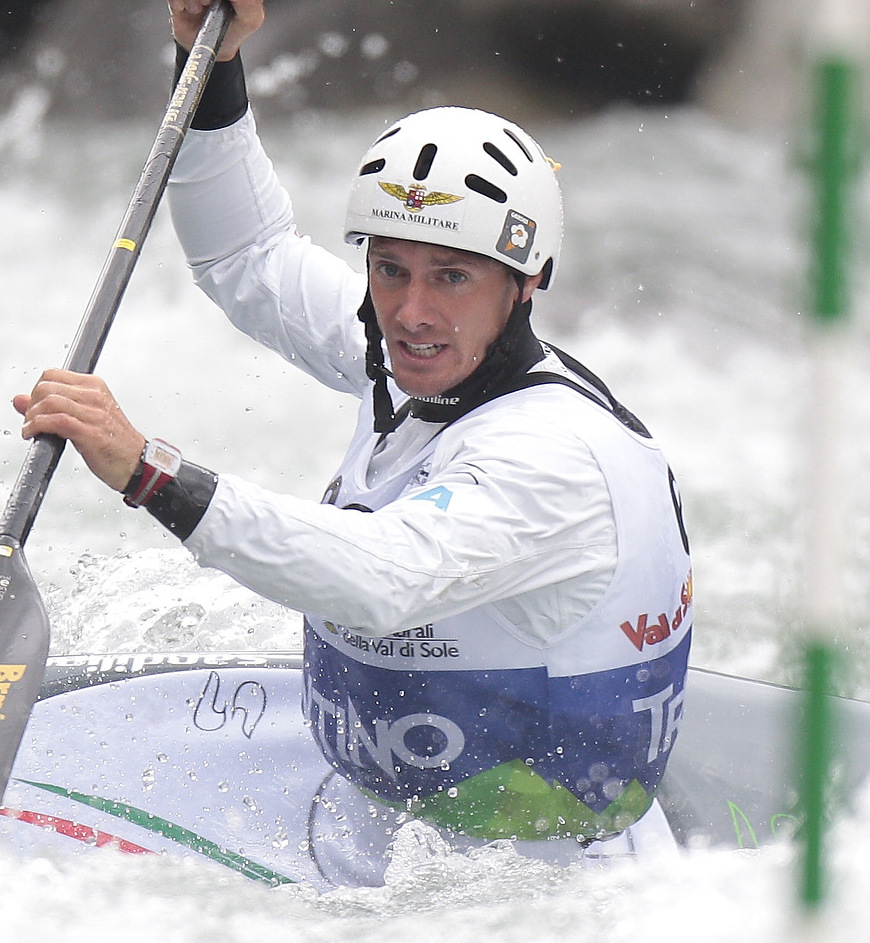
- Cipressi at the Italian Championships in Mezzana in 2014

Personal information
- Nationality: Italian
- Born: 25 December 1982 (age 43) Turin, Italy

Sport
- Country: Italy
- Sport: Canoeing
- Event: Slalom
- Club: G.S. Marina Militare
Medal record
World Championships
Gold medal – first place	2006 Prague	K1
Silver medal – second place	2006 Prague	K1 team
Bronze medal – third place	2010 Tacen	K1 team
European Championships
Bronze medal – third place	2005 Tacen	K1 team
Bronze medal – third place	2017 Tacen	C1 team
U23 European Championships
Silver medal – second place	2005 Kraków	K1 team
Bronze medal – third place	2004 Kraków	K1

Stefano Cipressi (born 25 November 1982) is an Italian slalom canoeist who has competed at the international level since 2000.

Cipressi is an athlete of the Gruppo Sportivo della Marina Militare,

== Biography ==
He won a complete set of medals at the ICF Canoe Slalom World Championships with a gold (K1: 2006), a silver (K1 team: 2006), and a bronze (K1 team: 2010). He also won two bronze medals at the European Championships.

Cipressi switched to single canoe (C1) class later on in his career and finished 13th in this event at the 2012 Summer Olympics in London.

== World Cup individual podiums ==
Season	Date	Venue	Position	Event
2004	25 Jul 2004	Bourg St.-Maurice	1st	K1
2006	5 Aug 2006	Prague	1st	K1^{1}

^{1} World Championship counting for World Cup points
