= Goumois, Doubs =

Goumois
- Commune
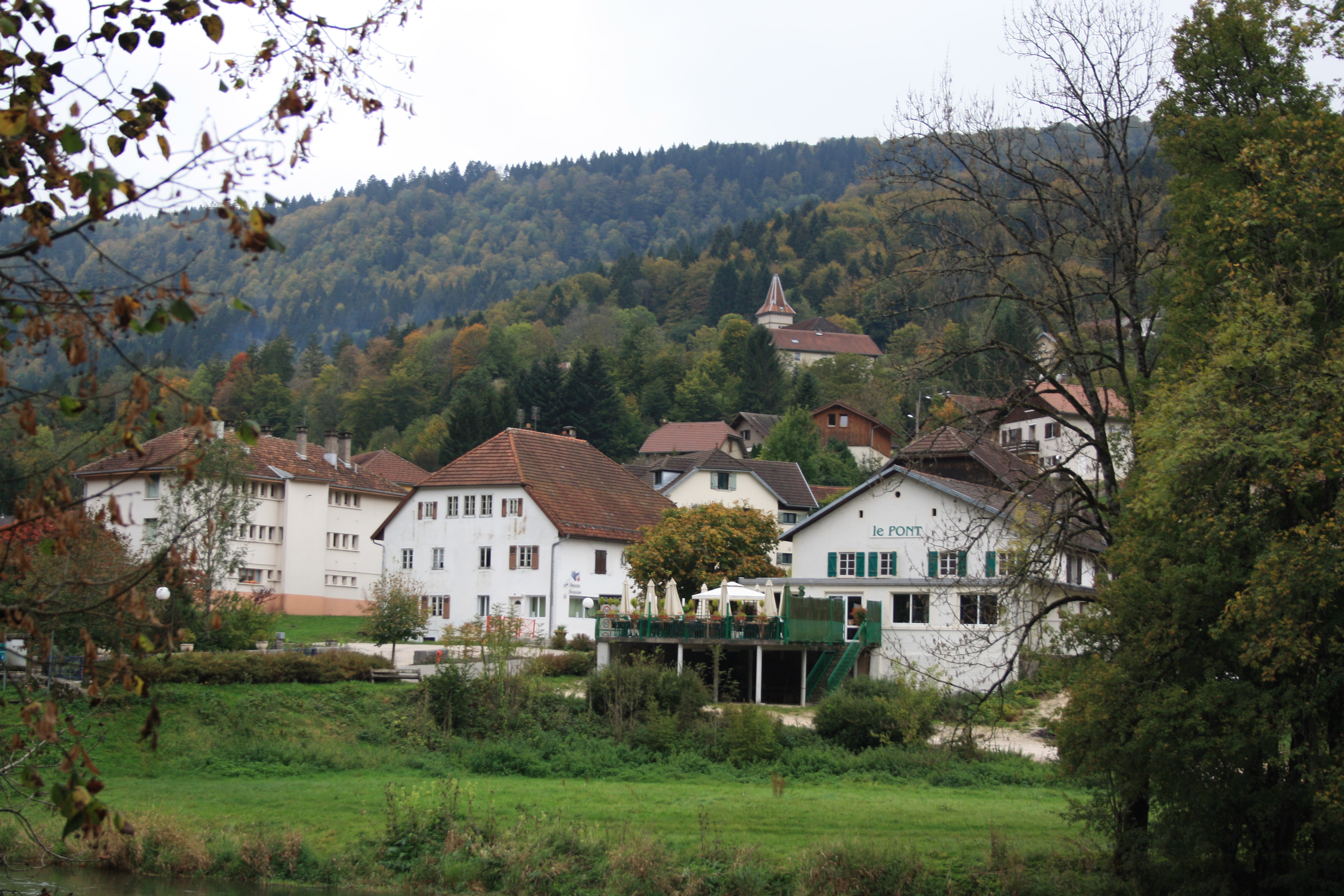
- A general view of Goumois

- Coat of arms
- Location of Goumois
- Location within France Location within Bourgogne-Franche-Comté
- Coordinates: 47°15′42″N 6°57′00″E
- Country: France
- Region: Bourgogne-Franche-Comté
- Department: Doubs
- Arrondissement: Montbéliard
- Canton: Maîche

Government
  - Mayor (2020–2026): Julien Naegelen
- Area^{1}: 5.83 km^{2} (2.25 sq mi)
- Highest elevation: 953 m (3,127 ft)
- Lowest elevation: 485 m (1,591 ft)
- Population (2023): 181
  - Density: 31.0/km^{2} (80.4/sq mi)
- Time zone: UTC+01:00 (CET)
  - Summer (DST): UTC+02:00 (CEST)
- INSEE/Postal code: 25280 /25470
- ^{1} French Land Register data, which excludes lakes, ponds, glaciers > 1 km^{2} (0.386 sq mi or 247 acres) and river estuaries.

Goumois (French pronunciation: [ɡumwa]) is a commune in the department of Doubs, in the eastern French region of Bourgogne-Franche-Comté.

== Population ==
Historical population
Year	Pop.	±% p.a.
1968	148	—
1975	134	−1.41%
1982	126	−0.88%
1990	136	+0.96%
1999	196	+4.14%
2007	188	−0.52%
2012	176	−1.31%
2017	162	−1.64%
2023	181	+1.87%
Source: INSEE

== See also ==
- Communes of the Doubs department
