= 2003 ICF Canoe Slalom World Championships =

2003 season of the ICF Canoe Slalom World Championship

The 2003 ICF Canoe Slalom World Championships were held in Augsburg, Germany under the auspices of International Canoe Federation for the record-tying third time. It was the 28th edition. Augsburg hosted the championships previously in 1957 and 1985 when the city was part of West Germany, and matches the times hosted by Spittal, Austria (1963, 1965, 1977), Meran, Italy (1953, 1971, 1983), and Bourg St.-Maurice, France (1969, 1987, 2002).

Competitions were held at the Augsburg Eiskanal facility which was built for the 1972 Summer Olympics.

== Medal summary ==
=== Men's ===
==== Canoe ====
Event	Gold	Points	Silver	Points	Bronze	Points
C1	Michal Martikán (SVK)	208.14	Tony Estanguet (FRA)	209.52	Stefan Pfannmöller (GER)	212.69
C1 team	Slovakia; Alexander Slafkovský; Juraj Minčík; Michal Martikán	212.24	France; Tony Estanguet; Emmanuel Brugvin; Patrice Estanguet	213.92	Czech Republic; Tomáš Indruch; Jan Mašek; Stanislav Ježek	214.41
C2	Germany; Marcus Becker; Stefan Henze	214.52	Czech Republic; Jaroslav Volf; Ondřej Štěpánek	221.66	Slovakia; Pavol Hochschorner; Peter Hochschorner	225.17
C2 team	Czech Republic; Jaroslav Volf & Ondřej Štěpánek; Jaroslav Pospíšil & Jaroslav Pollert; Marek Jiras & Tomáš Máder	234.99	Germany; Marcus Becker & Stefan Henze; André Ehrenberg & Michael Senft; Kay Simon & Robby Simon	237.74	Poland; Andrzej Wójs & Sławomir Mordarski; Jarosław Miczek & Wojciech Sekuła; Marcin Pochwała & Paweł Sarna	256.24

==== Kayak ====
Event	Gold	Points	Silver	Points	Bronze	Points
K1	Fabien Lefèvre (FRA)	197.88	David Ford (CAN)	199.69	Helmut Oblinger (AUT)	199.70
K1 team	Switzerland; Thomas Mosimann; Mathias Röthenmund; Michael Kurt	211.71	Netherlands; David Backhouse; Floris Braat; Sam Oud	213.80	Germany; Thilo Schmitt; Thomas Schmidt; Claus Suchanek	216.17

=== Women's ===
==== Kayak ====
Event	Gold	Points	Silver	Points	Bronze	Points
K1	Štěpánka Hilgertová (CZE)	224.02	Jennifer Bongardt (GER)	226.81	Rebecca Giddens (USA)	228.10
K1 team	Czech Republic; Štěpánka Hilgertová; Vanda Semerádová; Irena Pavelková	251.76	Germany; Jennifer Bongardt; Claudia Bär; Mandy Planert	253.84	United Kingdom; Helen Reeves; Heather Corrie; Laura Blakeman	256.35

== Medal table ==
Rank	Nation	Gold	Silver	Bronze	Total
1	Czech Republic (CZE)	3	1	1	5
2	Slovakia (SVK)	2	0	1	3
3	Germany (GER)	1	3	2	6
4	France (FRA)	1	2	0	3
5	Switzerland (SUI)	1	0	0	1
6	Canada (CAN)	0	1	0	1
6	Netherlands (NED)	0	1	0	1
8	Austria (AUT)	0	0	1	1
8	Great Britain (GBR)	0	0	1	1
8	Poland (POL)	0	0	1	1
8	United States (USA)	0	0	1	1
Totals (11 entries)		8	8	8	24
