= Čunovo Water Sports Centre =

Artificial whitewater course in Čunovo, near Bratislava, Slovakia

Coordinates: 48.030°N 17.230°E

- Areál Divoká Voda Čunovo

About
- Locale: Čunovo, Bratislava Slovakia
- Managing agent: Areál Divoká Voda Čunovo Bratislava
- Main shape: Two parallel channels plus return pool
- Flow diversion: yes
- Surf wave: yes
- Lighting: yes
- Canoe lift: yes
- Opening date: 1996

Stats
- Length: North: 356 metres (1,168 ft) South: 460 metres (1,509 ft)
- Drop: 6.6 m (22 ft)
- Slope: North: 1.9% (98 ft/mi) South: 1.4% (76 ft/mi)
- Flowrate: North: 22 m^{3}/s (780 cu ft/s) South: 12 m^{3}/s (420 cu ft/s)

The Čunovo Water Sports Centre is an artificial whitewater slalom course in Slovakia, on an island in the Danube river, 14 km southeast of Bratislava, near the village of Čunovo. It is powered by flow diversion from the Čunovo dam. Since 1997, it has hosted a full schedule of local, regional, and international competitions, including multiple World Cup races, 2 European Championships and the 2011 World Championships.

== Course description ==
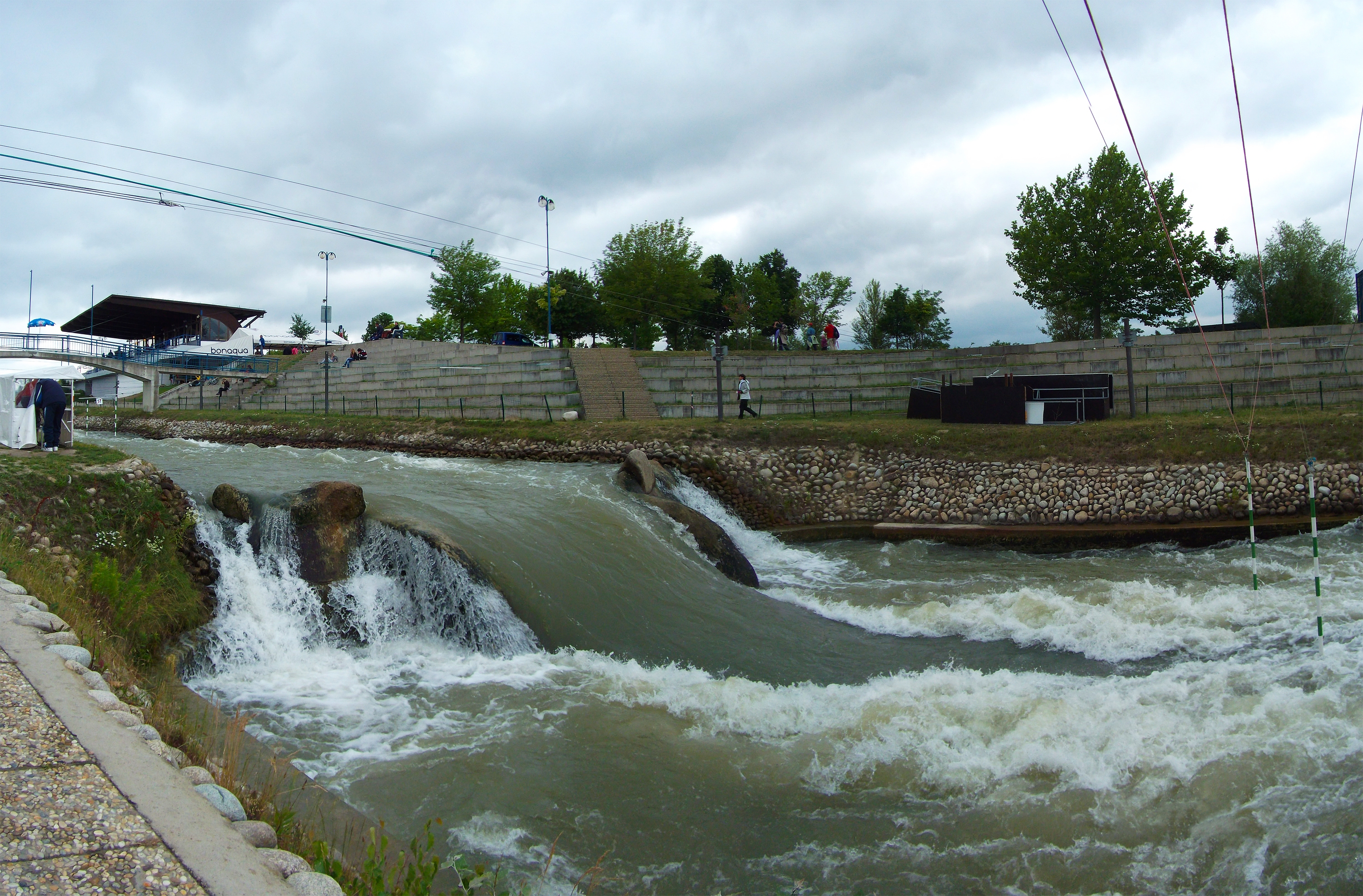
Niagara, the last drop of the left channel, is often the location of gate #20 in international canoe slalom competition.

The centre has two parallel whitewater channels; the drop is the same for both channels, 6.6 meters (22 feet). The left channel is 356 meters long, with a 1.9% slope of 19 m/km (98 ft/mile) and a streamflow of 7 to 22 m^{3}/s (247 to 777 ft^{3}/s). The right channel is 460 meters long, with a 1.4% slope of 14 m/km (76 ft/mile) and a streamflow of 7 to 12 m^{3}/s (247 to 424 ft^{3}/s). When both channels are watered, the left channel streamflow is 15 m^{3}/s (530 ft^{3}/s) and the right is 7 m^{3}/s (247 ft^{3}/s).

The two channels are connected at two crossover points, making a total of five alternative routes from start to finish. From a start in the left channel, there are three ways to run the course; from a right channel start there are two. Any run which ends up in the left channel includes a sheer final drop called "Niagara."

A conveyor-belt boat lift carries paddlers in their boats up to a 225-meter-long return canal on a level with the start pool.

The Čunovo Water Sports Centre was built in 1996 on an island near the mid-river end of the Čunovo dam, a flood control feature of the Čunovo to Gabčíkovo dam system. The island is high enough to remain dry during floods. In March 2002 and again the same August, the whitewater course was inundated, but the buildings and most of the island remained above water.

When the Water Sports Centre operates at full capacity, with the two whitewater channels carrying a combined total of 22 m^{3}/s (777 ft^{3}/s), it siphons off between 9% and 4.5% of the river's normal flow of 250 to 600 m^{3}/s (8,830 to 21,200 ft^{3}/s).

Two parallel race courses, with crossovers

Gate map for Semi-finals & Finals, 2013 World Cup Final Event, 24 August

Gate map for Heats, 2013 World Cup Final Event, 23 August

Full course operation represents a 4 megawatt sacrifice of electricity production at the Gabčíkovo dam 30 km farther downstream. Although the water flowing through the slalom course represents only 1.4 megawatts of power, if it stayed in the reservoir until it reached the Gabčíkovo dam, with a higher vertical drop, its energy potential would be greater. This fact makes the course more expensive to operate, in energy terms, than a similar pump-powered facility.

== Čunovo Dam ==
The "Budapest Treaty" of 1977, between Hungary and Czechoslovakia, was a plan to tame the Danube and increase its navigability with levees, dams, locks, overflow channels, and designated flood plains, and to generate hydroelectricity. The joint project was intended to cover the entire 150 km stretch of the Danube as it forms the border between Slovakia and Hungary, from the upstream, western, end at Čunovo, Slovakia, to Nagymaros, Hungary, in the east. Construction started when the Soviet Union broke up in 1991, but only on the Slovak side. In 1989, Hungary had suspended its participation and in 1992 backed out of the 1977 treaty altogether. Slovakia has been in litigation with Hungary ever since.

In 1992, Slovakia completed the 30 km section from Čunovo to Gabčíkovo, which includes a dam at each end, each dam spanning half the river width, the two dams being connected by a 30-km long levee, all of which combine to impound the 40 km^{2} Čunovo reservoir and force the river into a navigation channel on the left side of the riverbed. The Čunovo dam, on river right at the upstream end, is a flood control feature with 27 spillways to send excess water into the bypass channel and flood plain south of the navigation channel. The Gabčíkovo dam, at the downstream end, contains the main navigation locks and the hydropower plant, which began operation in 1996 and now provides electricity equal to 11% of the total Slovak demand. Its maximum capacity is 720 megawatts at a water discharge rate of 4,000 m^{3}/s (141,000 ft^{3}/s).

The two dams and the levee support a two-lane road which is the first Danube river crossing below Bratislava, but vehicles must drive the length of the 30-km levee to complete the crossing. This is the road which provides access to the Water Sports Centre, mid-river at the Čunovo end.

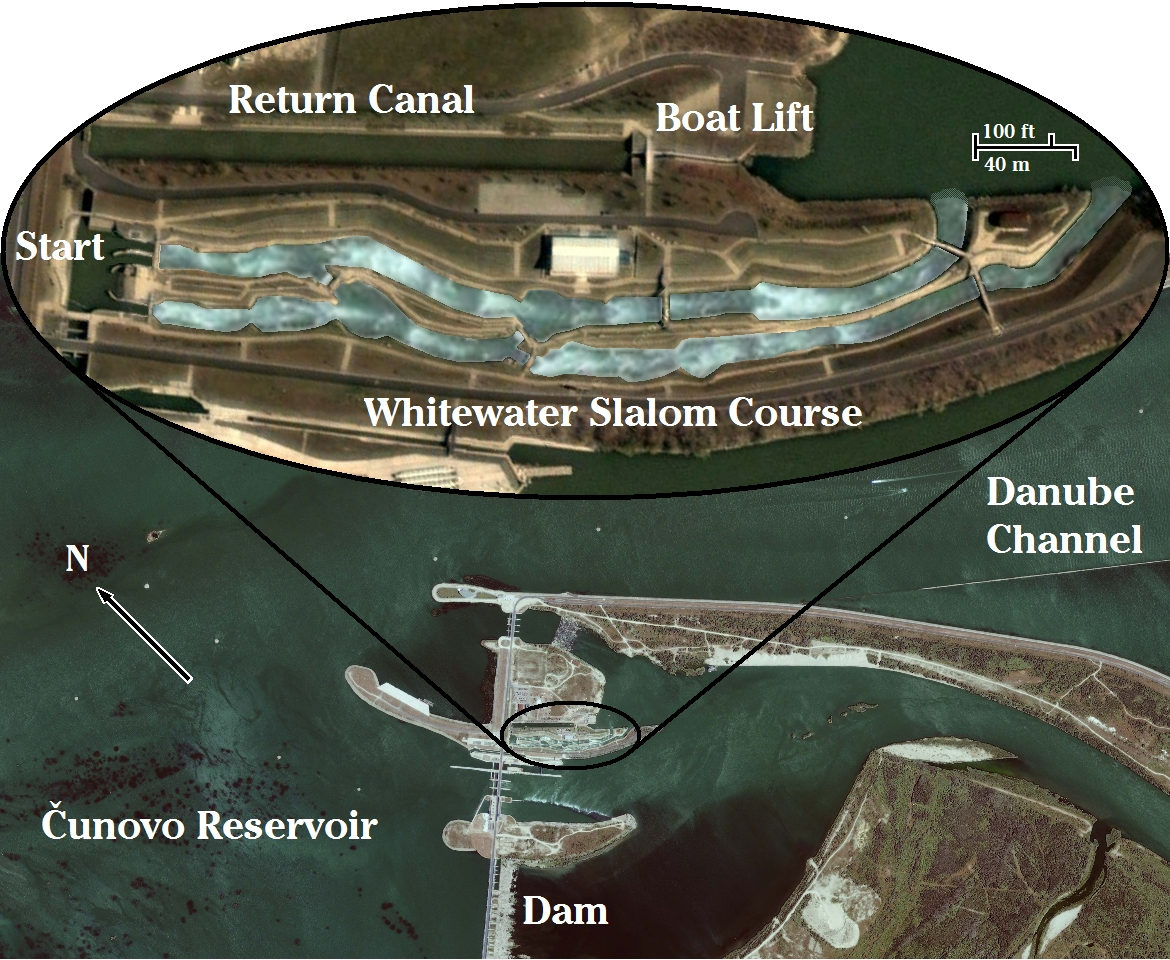
The slalom course is built on an island that straddles the Čunovo dam in the Danube river.
