= Hellinikon Olympic Canoe/Kayak Slalom Centre =

Sports venue in Athens, Greece

Coordinates: 37.901°N 23.735°E

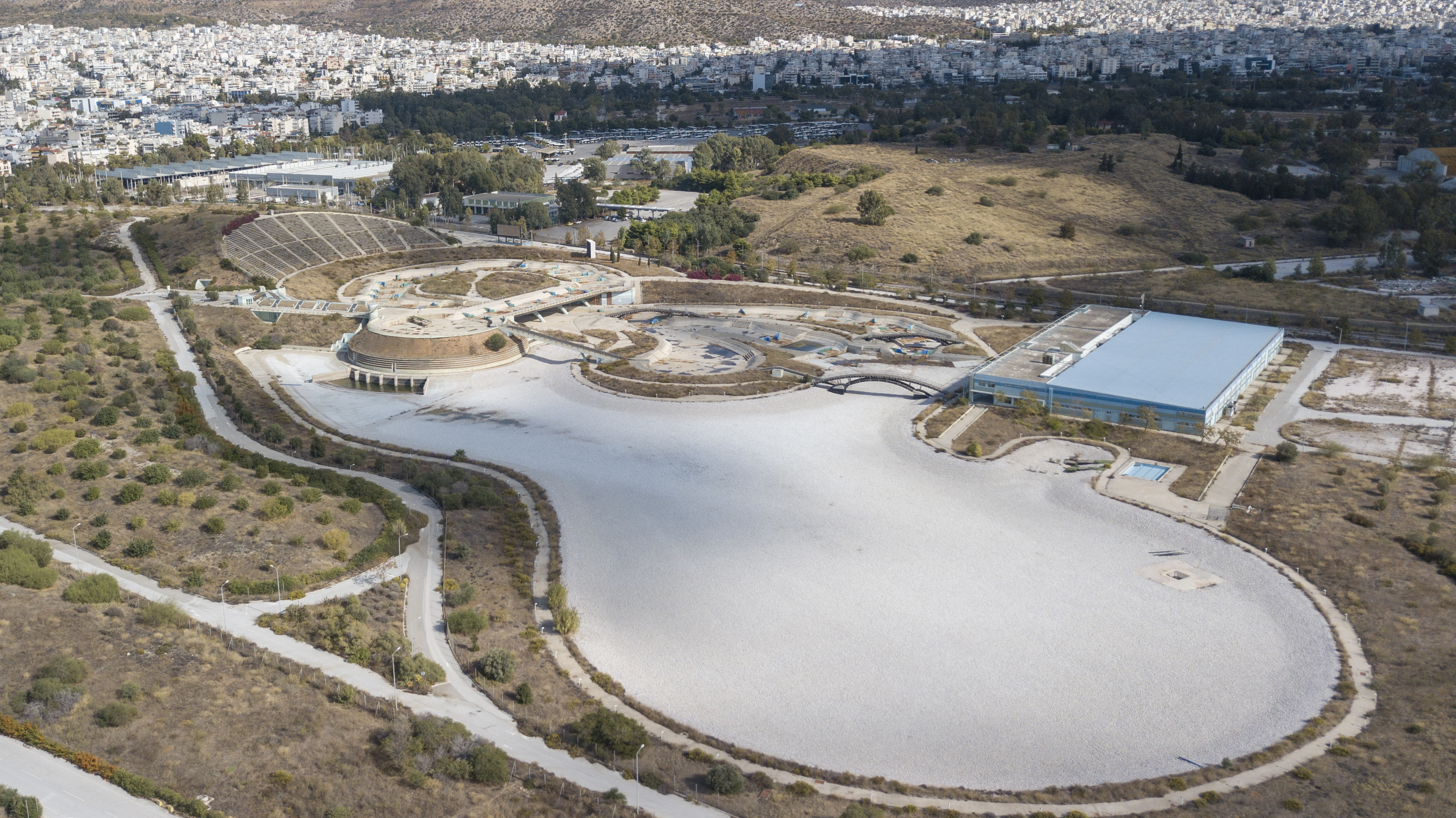
Hellinikon Olympic Canoe/Kayak Slalom Centre (2017)

The Hellinikon Olympic Canoe/Kayak Slalom Centre is located in the Hellinicon Olympic Complex in Athens, Greece. The venue hosted the canoe slalom events for the 2004 Summer Olympics.

It consists of a competition course, a secondary training course, and a warm-up lake of natural form that occupies a total area of 27,000 square metres. The total land surface area consists of 288,000 square metres. The facility seats 7,600 spectators, though only 6,700 seats were made publicly available for the Olympics. The Olympic Canoe/Kayak Slalom Centre of Athens is unique because it used salt water, rather than fresh water, to inundate the course.

As of August 2014 the venue lies in a state of disuse, with the course drained.

== See also ==
- Hellinikon Olympic Complex
