= Segre Olympic Park =

Canoeing and kayaking facility in La Seu d'Urgell, Catalonia, Spain

Coordinates: 42.355033°N 1.463278°E

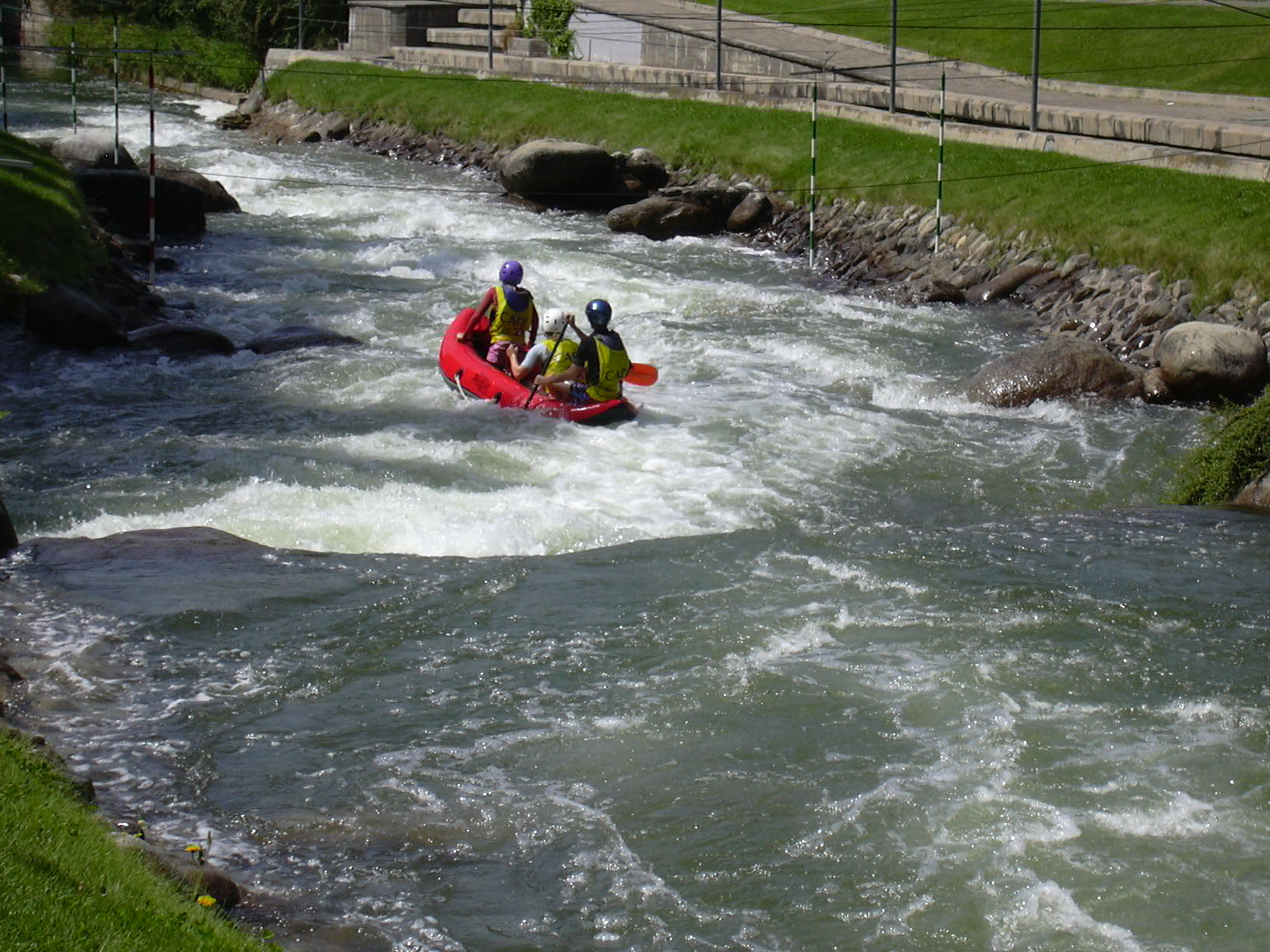
The Whitewater Course

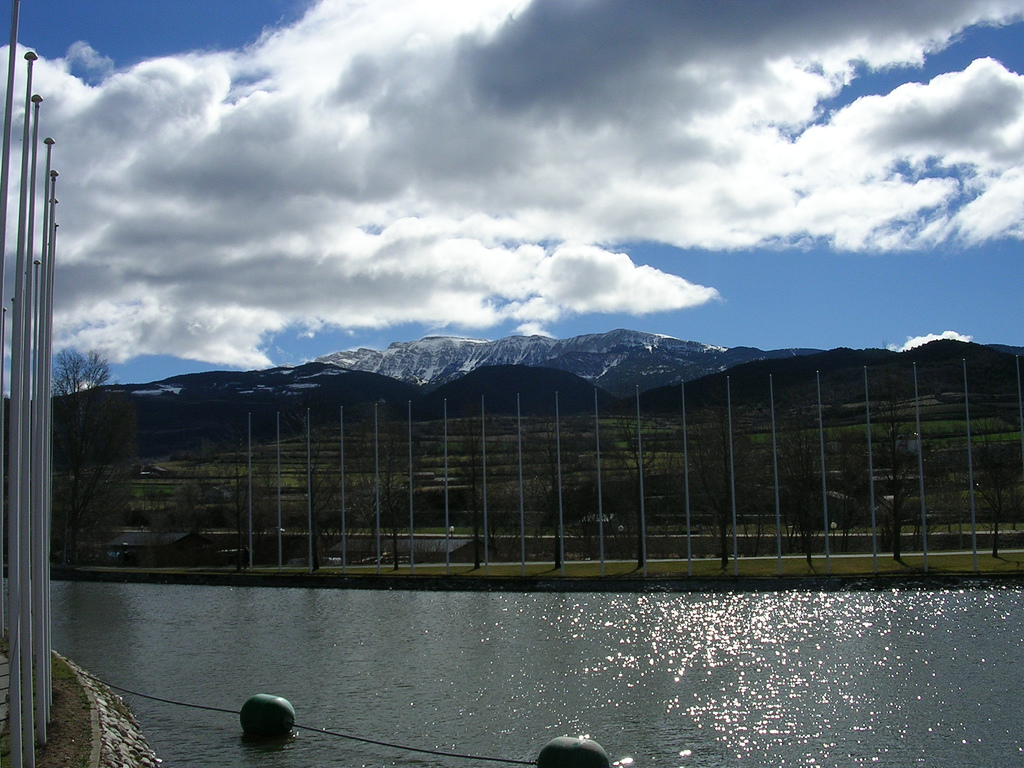
The Flatwater Canal

Parc Olímpic del Segre is a canoeing and kayaking facility in La Seu d'Urgell, Catalonia, Spain, built in 1990 for use during the 1992 Summer Olympics in Barcelona.

The competition whitewater course is 300 m long, with a 6.5 m drop, making a 2.2% slope of 114 ft/mile or 22 m/km. The natural flow of the Segre River is diverted through the course by a diversion dam upstream. In low flow conditions, four 300-kilowatt recirculation pumps can add up to 12 m^{3}/s to the course flow, in order to increase it to the course maximum of 17.5 m^{3}/s. When the course is not being used, or when the natural flow exceeds 17.5 m^{3}/s, the pumps are reversed and run in turbine mode to generate electricity for the town.

A 130-metre beginners course is a diversion from the main course. Its drop is 1.5 m for a 1.2% slope of 61 ft/mile or 12 m/km. Streamflow for the beginners course is 3 to 10 m^{3}/s.

The park also has a 650-m long feedwater canal which carries water from the river into the whitewater course. This canal is used for flatwater canoe and kayak training and competition.

The ICF Canoe Slalom World Championships have been held at the venue three times: 1999, 2009 and 2019.
