= Canoeing at the 2010 Asian Games – Men's slalom C-1 =

Men's C-1 at the 2010 Asian Games
- Venue: Guangzhou International Rowing Centre
- Date: 13–14 November 2010
- Competitors: 8 from 7 nations

Medalists
gold medal	Teng Zhiqiang	China
silver medal	Takuya Haneda	Japan
bronze medal	Chen Fangjia	China

The men's C-1 slalom canoeing competition at the 2010 Asian Games in Guangzhou was held on 13 and 14 November at the International Rowing Centre.

== Schedule ==
All times are China Standard Time (UTC+08:00)

Date	Time	Event
Saturday, 13 November 2010	10:00	Heats 1st run
Saturday, 13 November 2010	11:07	Heats 2nd run
Sunday, 14 November 2010	10:00	Semifinal
Sunday, 14 November 2010	11:07	Final

== Results ==
Legend

- DSQR — Disqualified for particular run

=== Heats ===
Rank	Athlete	1st run			2nd run			Best
Rank	Athlete	Time	Pen.	Total	Time	Pen.	Total	Best
1	Teng Zhiqiang (CHN)	88.90	2	90.90	89.47	2	91.47	90.90
2	Takuya Haneda (JPN)	87.83	4	91.83	93.92	4	97.92	91.83
3	Chen Fangjia (CHN)	89.94	2	91.94	96.36	4	100.36	91.94
4	Andrey Nikolaev (UZB)	104.11	4	108.11	103.85	4	107.85	107.85
5	Richard Merjan (LIB)	111.91	60	171.91	110.77	4	114.77	114.77
6	Rafail Vergoyazov (KAZ)	106.59	10	116.59	121.25	2	123.25	116.59
7	Homayoun Mohammadpour (IRI)	115.74	60	175.74	117.34	0	117.34	117.34
8	Kuo Meng-lung (TPE)	112.16	60	172.16	111.37	64	175.37	172.16

=== Semifinal ===
Rank	Athlete	Time	Pen.	Total
1	Teng Zhiqiang (CHN)	94.50	2	96.50
2	Takuya Haneda (JPN)	95.00	2	97.00
3	Chen Fangjia (CHN)	100.42	2	102.42
4	Kuo Meng-lung (TPE)	108.82	6	114.82
5	Andrey Nikolaev (UZB)	114.28	2	116.28
6	Rafail Vergoyazov (KAZ)	118.53	6	124.53
7	Richard Merjan (LIB)	121.52	54	175.52
—	Homayoun Mohammadpour (IRI)			DSQR

=== Final ===
Rank	Athlete	Time	Pen.	Total
1st place, gold medalist(s)	Teng Zhiqiang (CHN)	92.53	0	92.53
2nd place, silver medalist(s)	Takuya Haneda (JPN)	93.06	2	95.06
3rd place, bronze medalist(s)	Chen Fangjia (CHN)	95.92	4	99.92
4	Andrey Nikolaev (UZB)	105.73	2	107.73
5	Rafail Vergoyazov (KAZ)	112.98	6	118.98
6	Homayoun Mohammadpour (IRI)	115.58	8	123.58
7	Kuo Meng-lung (TPE)	124.22	2	126.22
8	Richard Merjan (LIB)	118.18	52	170.18
