= Canoeing at the 2014 Asian Games – Men's slalom C-1 =

2014 Asian Games event

Men's C-1 at the 2014 Asian Games
- Venue: Misari Regatta
- Date: 1–2 October 2014
- Competitors: 16 from 10 nations

Medalists
gold medal	Takuya Haneda	Japan
silver medal	Chang Yun-chuan	Chinese Taipei
bronze medal	Wang Xiaodong	China

The men's C-1 slalom canoeing competition at the 2014 Asian Games in Hanam was held from 1 to 2 October at the Misari Canoe/Kayak Center. The slalom event was on flat water and not an artificial canoe slalom course. The C-1 (canoe single) event is raced by one-man canoes. Each NOC could enter two athletes but only one of them could advance to the semifinal.

== Schedule ==
All times are Korea Standard Time (UTC+09:00)

Date	Time	Event
Wednesday, 1 October 2014	10:20	Heats
Wednesday, 1 October 2014	14:30	Last 16
Wednesday, 1 October 2014	15:47	Quarterfinals
Thursday, 2 October 2014	15:10	Semifinals
Thursday, 2 October 2014	15:45	Finals

== Results ==
Legend

- DSQ — Disqualified

=== Heats ===
Rank	Athlete	Time
1	Wang Xiaodong (CHN)	1:09.88
2	Chen Fangjia (CHN)	1:10.81
3	Takuya Haneda (JPN)	1:10.87
4	Chang Yun-chuan (TPE)	1:11.63
5	Amir Mohammad Fattahpour (IRI)	1:15.13
6	Yutthakan Chaidet (THA)	1:16.58
7	Alibek Temirgaliev (UZB)	1:17.12
8	Valeriy Shirokov (KAZ)	1:17.35
9	Valeriy Khavantsev (UZB)	1:17.83
10	Oh Yea-chan (KOR)	1:18.10
11	Kazuya Taniguchi (JPN)	1:18.37
12	Alexandr Kulikov (KAZ)	1:18.81
13	Kim Beom-soo (KOR)	1:19.40
14	Chatuphon Thimthong (THA)	1:19.59
15	Prince Parmar (IND)	1:22.58
16	Richard Merjan (LIB)	1:24.25

=== Last 16 ===
Rank	Athlete	Time
1	Takuya Haneda (JPN)	1:09.90
2	Wang Xiaodong (CHN)	1:10.49
3	Chang Yun-chuan (TPE)	1:10.60
4	Chen Fangjia (CHN)	1:11.07
5	Valeriy Khavantsev (UZB)	1:15.16
6	Kazuya Taniguchi (JPN)	1:16.60
7	Oh Yea-chan (KOR)	1:16.90
8	Alexandr Kulikov (KAZ)	1:16.98
9	Kim Beom-soo (KOR)	1:17.43
10	Alibek Temirgaliev (UZB)	1:17.70
11	Yutthakan Chaidet (THA)	1:17.96
12	Chatuphon Thimthong (THA)	1:18.27
13	Richard Merjan (LIB)	1:23.86
14	Prince Parmar (IND)	1:28.80
—	Amir Mohammad Fattahpour (IRI)	DSQ
—	Valeriy Shirokov (KAZ)	DSQ

=== Knockout round ===
Quarterfinals
1	Takuya Haneda (JPN)	1:15.77
5	Valeriy Khavantsev (UZB)	1:18.51
2	Wang Xiaodong (CHN)	1:11.69
6	Kazuya Taniguchi (JPN)	1:18.77
3	Chang Yun-chuan (TPE)	1:13.54
7	Oh Yea-chan (KOR)	1:30.35
4	Chen Fangjia (CHN)	1:12.67
8	Alexandr Kulikov (KAZ)	1:18.68

Semifinals
1	Wang Xiaodong (CHN)	1:11.65
3	Takuya Haneda (JPN)	1:11.42
(Pairings are reseeded after the first round)
2	Chang Yun-chuan (TPE)	1:13.00
4	Valeriy Khavantsev (UZB)	1:20.12

Gold medal
3	Takuya Haneda (JPN)	1:13.08
2	Chang Yun-chuan (TPE)	1:14.26
Bronze medal
1	Wang Xiaodong (CHN)	1:14.00
4	Valeriy Khavantsev (UZB)	1:20.03

- Chen Fangjia (CHN) got eliminated because each NOC was limited to one athlete in the semifinal.
