= Mojee =

- Other names: Mojee Quan, Heilang Quan, Mojie Quan, Chinese Heilang Quan, Chinese black wolfdog, Mojee Dog, China Mojee
- Origin: China
Traits
- Height: 26–30 in (65–75 cm)
- Weight: 88–121 lb (40–55 kg)
- Coat: short coat
- Color: Black, Black with white spots

Mojee, also known as Mojee Quan (墨界犬), Heilang Quan (黑狼犬), Mojie Quan, Chinese black wolfdog, is a dog breed that originated in China. Heilang Quan is the official name of this breed.

== Background ==
Mojee Quan originated in northern China in the 19th century. It is a Chinese dog breed formed by crossing German Shepherd with the tugou native to northern China and the wild wolf from northern China.

== Appearance ==
The Mojee Quan is a large working dog breed. Their fur is short and black in color. The ears are erect. Some atavistic Mojee Quan will have some white fur growing on their chests.

== Use as a working dog ==
The Mojee Quan is a versatile working dog. They are often used as fighting dogs, detection dogs, search and rescue dogs, guard dogs, military working dogs, assistance dogs, service dogs, etc. They can also be used as companion dogs.

=== As a police dog ===
On July 25, 2011, the China Working Dog Management Association tested Mojee Quan’s obedience, desire to pick up, and other aspects, affirmed this dog breed, and granted its breed working dog registration and chip implantation. In 2013, Mojee Quan was tested in multiple Chinese police dog bases and was recognized by the China National Police Dog Base.
