= Etienne Stott =

English slalom canoeist

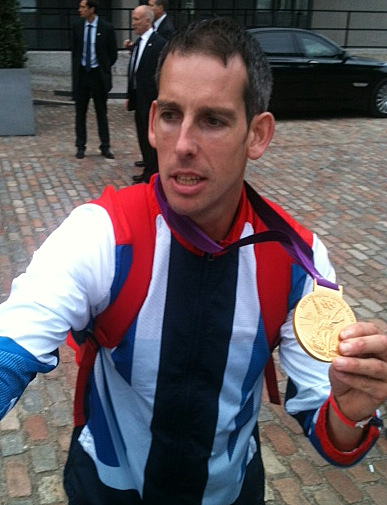
- Stott at Our Greatest Team Parade in 2012

Medal record

Men's canoe slalom

Representing Great Britain

Olympic Games
Gold medal – first place	2012 London	C2

World Championships
Bronze medal – third place	2009 La Seu d'Urgell	C2 team
Bronze medal – third place	2011 Bratislava	C2 team
Bronze medal – third place	2015 London	C2 team

European Championships
Gold medal – first place	2012 Augsburg	C2 team
Silver medal – second place	2009 Nottingham	C2 team
Bronze medal – third place	2009 Nottingham	C2
Bronze medal – third place	2010 Bratislava	C2 team

Etienne Stott MBE (born 30 June 1979) is an English slalom canoeist who started competing at the international level in 2002, initially in the K1 category, but switching to C2 in 2005. He retired from the sport in 2016. He is the Olympic Champion in the C2 event from the 2012 Summer Olympics in London.

== Career ==
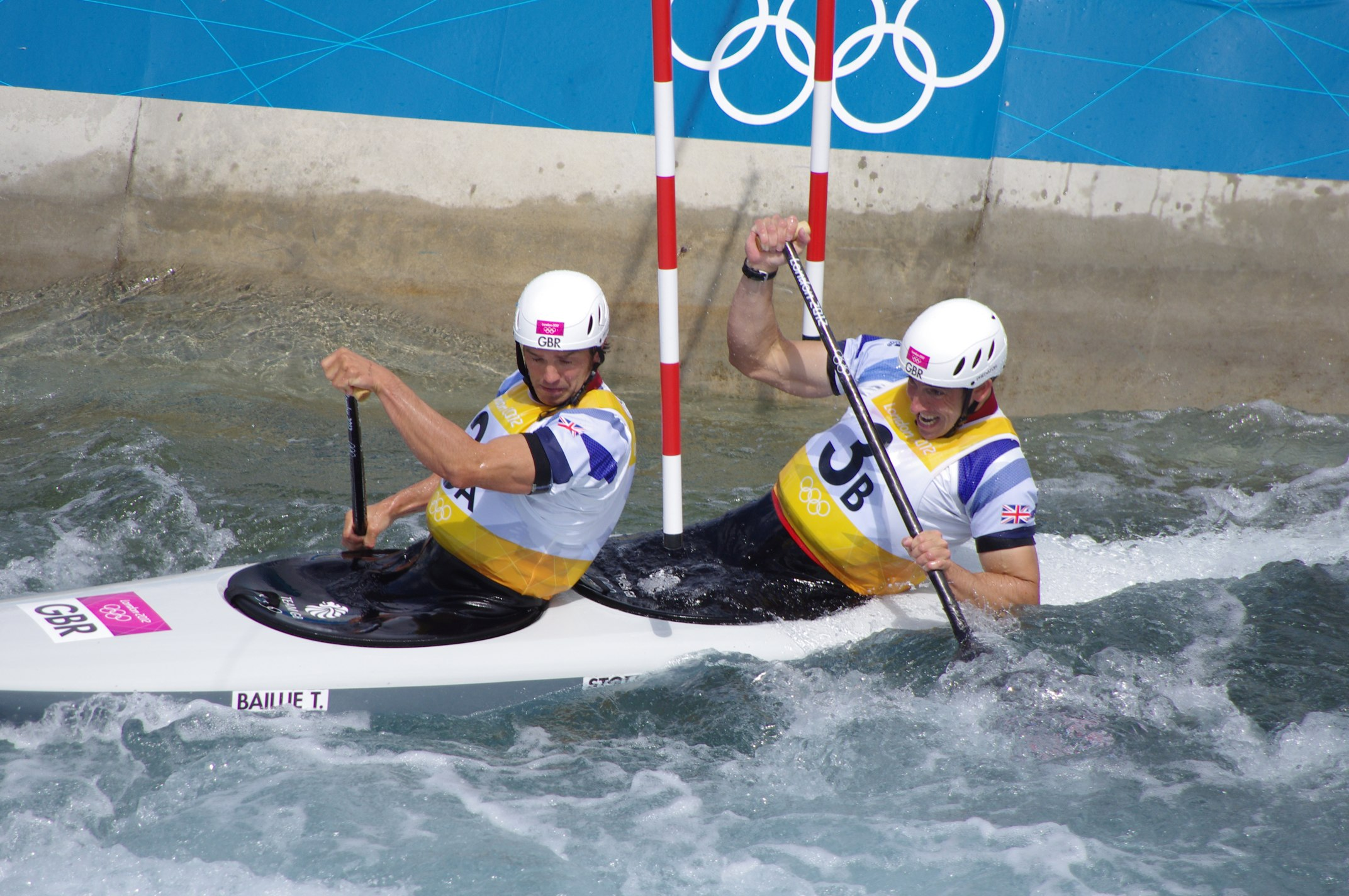
Tim Baillie & Etienne Stott (right) at the 2012 Summer Olympics

Etienne and his partner Tim Baillie won two bronze medals in the C2 team event at the ICF Canoe Slalom World Championships (2009, 2011). They also won a bronze medal in the C2 event at the 2009 European Championships at the Holme Pierrepont National Watersports Centre, Nottingham, England and came in fourth place at the 2009 ICF Canoe Slalom World Championships in La Seu d'Urgell. They won another silver and a bronze in the C2 team event at the European Championships alongside the other UK boats of David Florence/Richard Hounslow and Daniel Goddard/Colin Radmore. In 2012 they were a part of the British team that won gold at the European Championships in Augsburg in the C2 team event. They are British Premier Division Champions and British Open Champions.

At the 2012 Summer Olympics, Stott and partner Tim Baillie qualified through the heats for the C2 event on 30 July, and subsequently progressed to the semi-final. The semi-final consisted of one run each, with the six best competitors qualifying for the final. Stott and Baillie finished in sixth place, taking the final spot and consequently qualifying for the final. As a result of their sixth-place finish, the slowest qualifying time out of the six remaining competitors, Stott and Baillie ran first in the final, securing a time of 106.41. The time was not beaten, with Stott and Baillie winning the gold medal in front of a 12,000 strong home crowd at the Lee Valley White Water Centre on 2 August. Fellow British boat of David Florence and Richard Hounslow finished second with a time of 106.77. Stott and Baillie's success was described as "unexpected" and a "surprise", with the pair describing winning gold as "mad".

Stott was partnered by Tim Baillie from 2005 to 2013. He paired up with Mark Proctor for 2015 and 2016.

Stott was appointed Member of the Order of the British Empire (MBE) in the 2013 New Year Honours for services to canoeing.

He has credited meditation/mindfulness as significantly helpful in his sporting achievement.

== Career highlights ==
- 2012 Summer Olympics, London - Gold Medal Men's C2
- 2011 Australian Open - Penrith Whitewater Stadium - Silver Medal Men's C2
- 2010 World Championships - Tacen - 17th place
- 2010 European Championships - Bratislava - 4th place Men's C2 & Bronze Medal Men's Team C2
- 2010 World Cup: Event 1 Prague 9th; Event 2 La Seu d'Urgell Parc Olímpic del Segre 6th, Event 3 Augsburg Eiskanal 3rd
- 2009 World Championships - La Seu d’Urgell Parc Olímpic del Segre - 4th place Men's C2, Bronze Medal Men's Team C2
- 2009 European Championships - Nottingham Holme Pierrepont National Watersports Centre Bronze Medal, Men's C2, Silver Medal Men's Team C2
- 2009 World Cup: Overall 4th; Event 1 Pau 7th; Event 2 Bratislava 5th; Augsburg 5th

== World Cup individual podiums ==
Season	Date	Venue	Position	Event
2007	8 Jul 2007	Tacen	2nd	C2
2010	3 Jul 2010	Augsburg	3rd	C2
2013	30 Jun 2013	Augsburg	2nd	C2

== Personal life ==
Born in Manchester, Stott grew up in Bedford, England, and attended Biddenham Upper School. He studied Mechanical Engineering at the University of Nottingham.

== Activism and arrest ==
On 21 April 2019, Stott was arrested with Extinction Rebellion on Waterloo Bridge in London for allegedly obstructing the highway - in breach of Section 40 of the Public Order Act. He was carried off of the bridge by four Police officers, where he shouted “ecological emergency.” He said he did not regret being arrested, and praised the actions of Greta Thunberg.

On 21 January 2021, he pleaded guilty and was handed a conditional discharge and ordered to pay costs amounting to £300.

On 2 September 2021, Stott breached his bail conditions which prohibited him from entering the City of London. He wasn’t arrested.

In October 2021, Stott was part of a group of Extinction Rebellion activists blockading the entrance to Fawley Refinery in Hampshire, alongside fellow Olympian Laura Baldwin.

Stott, along with Dave Hampton, former GB rower, runs the climate campaign Champions for Earth, who "believe that there is nothing more critical than addressing and averting the climate and ecological crisis, and we believe that athletes have a powerful opportunity to voice that message in a way that can be heard."

== See also ==
- 2012 Summer Olympics and Paralympics gold post boxes
