= 2010 Canoe Slalom World Cup =

The 2010 Canoe Slalom World Cup was a series of five races in 5 canoeing and kayaking categories organized by the International Canoe Federation (ICF). It was the 23rd edition and it marked the first time that women competed for the single canoe world cup points and title. The series consisted of 2 continental championships (Oceania and Asia) which were open to all countries and 3 world cup races. The athletes gained points for their results in the three world cup races plus their best result from any of the two continental championships.

== Calendar ==
Label	Venue	Date
Oceania Open Continental Championships	(Australia) Penrith	19–21 February
2010 Asian Canoe Slalom Championships	(China) Xiasi	1–3 May
World Cup Race 1	(Czech Republic) Prague	18–20 June
World Cup Race 2	(Spain) La Seu d'Urgell	26–27 June
World Cup Race 3	(Germany) Augsburg	2–4 July

== Final standings ==
The winner of each race was awarded 60 points. Points for lower places differed from one category to another. Every participant was guaranteed at least 2 points for participation and 5 points for qualifying for the semifinal run.

=== C1 men ===
Pos	Athlete	Points
1	Matej Beňuš (SVK)	166
2	Alexander Slafkovský (SVK)	161
3	Stanislav Ježek (CZE)	146
4	Teng Zhiqiang (CHN)	139
5	Sideris Tasiadis (GER)	134
6	Mark Proctor (GBR)	129
7	Takuya Haneda (JPN)	126
8	Benjamin Savšek (SLO)	117
9	David Florence (GBR)	111
10	Tony Estanguet (FRA)	110

=== C1 women ===
Pos	Athlete	Points
1	Cen Nanqin (CHN)	210
2	Leanne Guinea (AUS)	200
3	Jana Dukátová (SVK)	191
4	Teng Qianqian (CHN)	188
5	Jessica Fox (AUS)	156
6	Rosalyn Lawrence (AUS)	143
7	Katarína Macová (SVK)	128
8	Kateřina Hošková (CZE)	113
9	Mallory Franklin (GBR)	78
10	Louise Jull (NZL)	64

=== C2 men ===
Pos	Athletes	Points
1	Ladislav Škantár/Peter Škantár (SVK)	201
2	Pavol Hochschorner/Peter Hochschorner (SVK)	169
3	Hu Minghai/Shu Junrong (CHN)	142
4	Marcus Becker/Stefan Henze (GER)	137
5	David Schröder/Frank Henze (GER)	132
6	Fabien Lefèvre/Denis Gargaud Chanut (FRA)	127
7	Tim Baillie/Etienne Stott (GBR)	119
8	David Florence/Richard Hounslow (GBR)	111
9	Jaroslav Volf/Ondřej Štěpánek (CZE)	103
10	Tomáš Kučera/Ján Bátik (SVK)	101

=== K1 men ===
Pos	Athlete	Points
1	Daniele Molmenti (ITA)	223
2	Michael Kurt (SUI)	162
3	Vavřinec Hradilek (CZE)	138
4	Peter Kauzer (SLO)	136
5	Pierre Bourliaud (FRA)	128
6	Campbell Walsh (GBR)	125
7	Hannes Aigner (GER)	123
8	John Hastings (CAN)	121
9	Jure Meglič (SLO)	121
10	Alexander Grimm (GER)	119

=== K1 women ===
Pos	Athlete	Points
1	Jana Dukátová (SVK)	181
2	Corinna Kuhnle (AUT)	165
3	Elena Kaliská (SVK)	143
4	Violetta Oblinger-Peters (AUT)	142
5	Štěpánka Hilgertová (CZE)	122
6	Irena Pavelková (CZE)	120
7	Jasmin Schornberg (GER)	119
8	Sarah Grant (AUS)	118
9	Louise Donington (GBR)	117
10	Marie Řihošková (CZE)	111

== Results ==
=== Oceania Canoe Slalom Open ===
The Oceania Canoe Slalom Open took place in Penrith, Australia on February 19–21. Five countries won a gold medal at the event. Slovakia was the most successful with a gold and two silvers. Home paddlers from Australia won one gold and two bronze medals.

Event	Gold	Score	Silver	Score	Bronze	Score
C1 men	Edern Le Ruyet (FRA)	105.28	Vítězslav Gebas (CZE)	107.50	Takuya Haneda (JPN)	108.46
C1 women	Jessica Fox (AUS)	125.01	Jana Dukátová (SVK)	126.88	Leanne Guinea (AUS)	129.44
C2 men	Slovakia; Ladislav Škantár; Peter Škantár	109.03	Slovakia; Pavol Hochschorner; Peter Hochschorner	111.60	United Kingdom; Daniel Goddard; Colin Radmore	114.32
K1 men	Daniele Molmenti (ITA)	97.63	Vavřinec Hradilek (CZE)	99.42	Pierre Bourliaud (FRA)	99.87
K1 women	Corinna Kuhnle (AUT)	111.35	Kateřina Kudějová (CZE)	112.86	Sarah Grant (AUS)	112.92

=== 2010 Asian Canoe Slalom Championships ===
The 2010 Asian Canoe Slalom Championships took place in Xiasi, China on May 1–3. Chinese paddlers won 4 out of the 5 events and added 5 silvers and 3 bronzes.

Event	Gold	Score	Silver	Score	Bronze	Score
C1 men	Ian Borrows (AUS)	100.70	Teng Zhiqiang (CHN)	102.93	Feng Liming (CHN)	104.52
C1 women	Cen Nanqin (CHN)	124.18	Teng Qianqian (CHN)	133.37	Wang Yawei (CHN)	198.94
C2 men	China; Hu Minghai; Shu Junrong	104.65	China; Yu Hongmin; Chen Jin	112.19	China; Shan Bao; Chen Fei	118.26
K1 men	Tan Ya (CHN)	97.76	Huang Cunguang (CHN)	98.53	Hermann Husslein (THA)	99.27
K1 women	Shu Zhenghua (CHN)	114.62	Zou Yingying (CHN)	115.47	Aki Yazawa (JPN)	119.76

=== World Cup Race 1 ===
The first regular world cup race took place in Prague, Czech Republic on June 18–20. China topped the medal table with 2 golds and a silver. Czech paddlers took one medal of each color.

Event	Gold	Score	Silver	Score	Bronze	Score
C1 men	Michal Jáně (CZE)	98.69	Benjamin Savšek (SLO)	100.10	Alexander Slafkovský (SVK)	100.36
C1 women	Cen Nanqin (CHN)	129.86	Teng Qianqian (CHN)	137.03	Katarína Macová (SVK)	141.53
C2 men	China; Hu Minghai; Shu Junrong	108.05	Slovakia; Pavol Hochschorner; Peter Hochschorner	108.38	Poland; Piotr Szczepański; Marcin Pochwała	108.70
K1 men	Daniele Molmenti (ITA)	92.62	Luboš Hilgert (CZE)	94.02	Michael Kurt (SUI)	94.68
K1 women	Jasmin Schornberg (GER)	109.05	Fiona Pennie (GBR)	109.16	Štěpánka Hilgertová (CZE)	109.79

=== World Cup Race 2 ===
The penultimate race of the series took place in La Seu d'Urgell, Spain on June 26–27. Five different nations won gold with Slovakia adding 2 silver medals to top the medal table. Spain had a gold and a bronze.

Event	Gold	Score	Silver	Score	Bronze	Score
C1 men	Stanislav Ježek (CZE)	91.34	Tony Estanguet (FRA)	95.58	Ander Elosegi (ESP)	95.73
C1 women	Jessica Fox (AUS)	116.15	Jana Dukátová (SVK)	119.15	Leanne Guinea (AUS)	121.42
C2 men	Slovakia; Ladislav Škantár; Peter Škantár	98.08	Czech Republic; Jaroslav Volf; Ondřej Štěpánek	98.63	Germany; Marcus Becker; Stefan Henze	99.10
K1 men	Daniele Molmenti (ITA)	88.61	Michael Kurt (SUI)	89.18	Peter Kauzer (SLO)	89.91
K1 women	Maialen Chourraut (ESP)	99.65	Elena Kaliská (SVK)	100.73	Fiona Pennie (GBR)	100.75

=== World Cup Race 3 ===
The final world cup race was held in Augsburg, Germany on July 2–4. The home German paddlers won 4 out of 5 events and added 1 silver and 2 bronze medals.

Event	Gold	Score	Silver	Score	Bronze	Score
C1 men	Nico Bettge (GER)	104.69	Tony Estanguet (FRA)	105.77	Sideris Tasiadis (GER)	106.27
C1 women	Cen Nanqin (CHN)	142.75	Leanne Guinea (AUS)	150.72	Kateřina Hošková (CZE)	150.79
C2 men	Germany; David Schröder; Frank Henze	116.68	France; Fabien Lefèvre; Denis Gargaud Chanut	116.74	United Kingdom; Tim Baillie; Etienne Stott	117.05
K1 men	Hannes Aigner (GER)	98.91	Alexander Grimm (GER)	100.12	Paul Böckelmann (GER)	100.19
K1 women	Jennifer Bongardt (GER)	114.97	Jana Dukátová (SVK)	115.09	Lizzie Neave (GBR)	117.29
