= Cen Nanqin =

Chinese canoeist

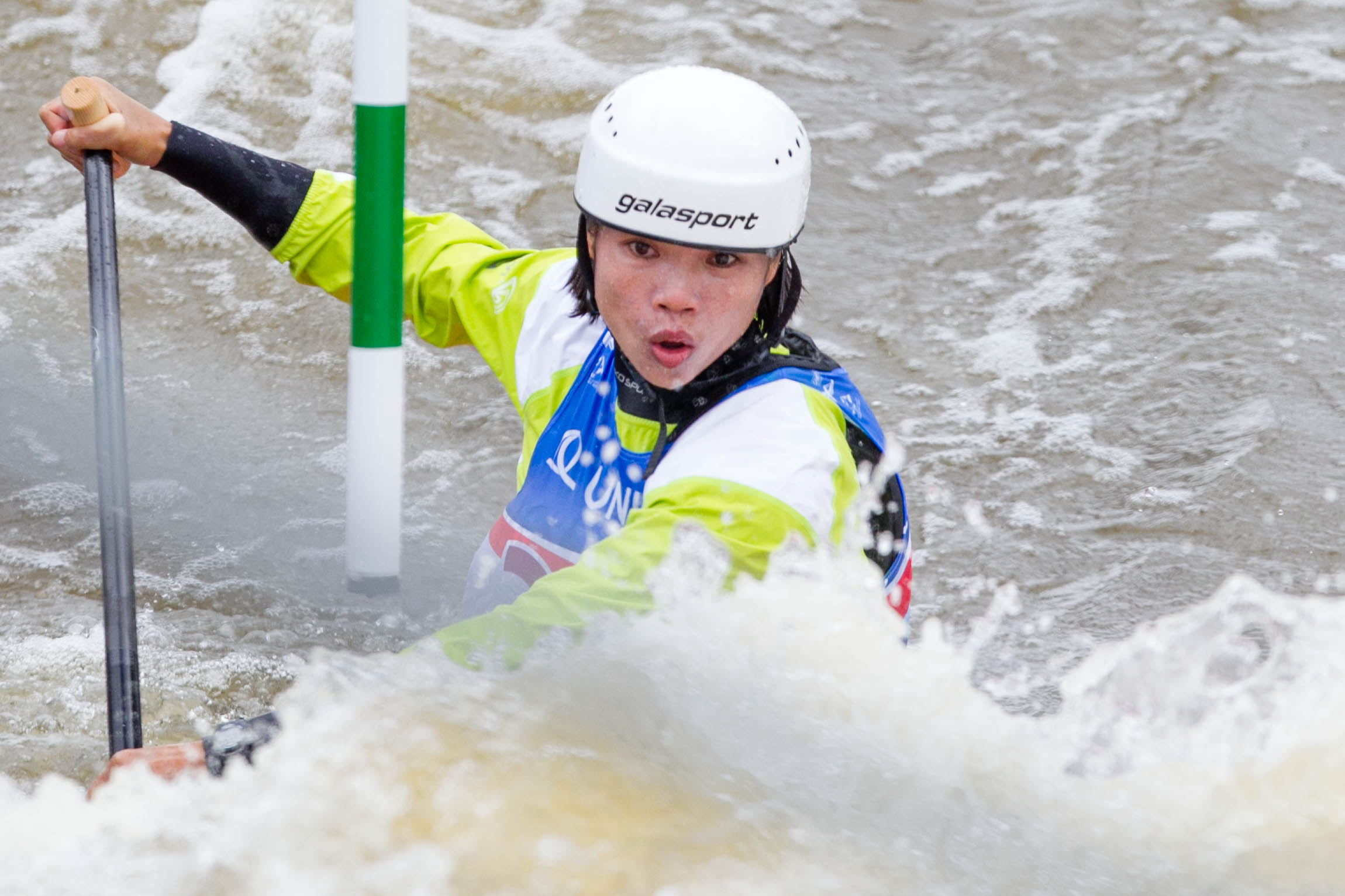
- Cen Nanqin at Slalom World Championships in 2013

Personal information
- Born: September 26, 1983 (age 42) Ceheng, Qianxinan Buyei and Miao Autonomous Prefecture, Guizhou, China
- Height: 162 cm (5 ft 4 in)
- Weight: 58 kg (128 lb)
Medal record
Women's canoe slalom
Representing China
World Championships
Silver medal – second place	2011 Bratislava	C1
Asian Games
Gold medal – first place	2014 Incheon	C1
Asian Championships
Gold medal – first place	2010 Xiasi	C1

Cen Nanqin (Chinese: 岑南琴; born September 26, 1983) is a Chinese female slalom canoeist who competed at the international level from 2006 to 2018. She won a silver medal in the C1 event at the 2011 ICF Canoe Slalom World Championships in Bratislava.

In 2010 she won the inaugural world cup title in women's C1 discipline and finished the season as the World No. 1.

At the 2014 Asian Games she won a gold medal in the women's slalom C1 event.

== World Cup individual podiums ==
Season	Date	Venue	Position	Event
2006	27 Aug 2006	Zhangjiajie	3rd	K1^{1}
2008	18 May 2008	Nakhon Nayok	2nd	K1^{1}
2010	2 May 2010	Xiasi	1st	C1^{1}
2010	19 Jun 2010	Prague	1st	C1
2010	3 Jul 2010	Augsburg	1st	C1
2014	21 Jun 2014	Prague	3rd	C1

^{1} Asia Canoe Slalom Championship counting for World Cup points
