= Huang Cunguang =

Chinese canoeist

Personal information
- Native name: 黄存光
- Nationality: Chinese
- Born: 29 July 1985 (age 41) Changle, Fujian
- Height: 1.72 m (5 ft 8 in)
- Weight: 75 kg (165 lb)

Sport
- Country: China
- Sport: Canoe slalom
- Event: K1
Medal record
Men's canoe slalom
Representing China
Asian Championships
Gold medal – first place	2010 Xiasi	K1 team
Silver medal – second place	2010 Xiasi	K1
Silver medal – second place	2016 Toyama	K1 team

Huang Cunguang (Chinese: 黄存光; born July 29, 1985, in Changle, Fujian) is a Chinese slalom canoeist who has competed at the international level since 2005. At the 2012 Summer Olympics he competed in the K1 event, finishing 17th in the heats, failing to qualify for the semifinals.

== World Cup individual podiums ==
Season	Date	Venue	Position	Event
2008	18 May 2008	Nakhon Nayok	3rd	K1^{1}
2010	2 May 2010	Xiasi	2nd	K1^{1}

^{1} Asia Canoe Slalom Championship counting for World Cup points
