= Tan Ya =

Chinese canoeist

Personal information
- Native name: 谭亚
- Nationality: Chinese
- Born: July 18, 1992 (age 33) Huaihua, Hunan

Sport
- Country: China
- Sport: Canoe slalom
- Event: K1
Medal record
Men's canoe slalom
Representing China
Asian Championships
Gold medal – first place	2010 Xiasi	K1
Gold medal – first place	2010 Xiasi	K1 team
Gold medal – first place	2016 Toyama	K1
Silver medal – second place	2016 Toyama	K1 team

Tan Ya (Chinese: 谭亚; born July 18, 1992, in Huaihua, Hunan) is a male Chinese slalom canoeist who has competed since 2008.

He finished in 19th place in the K1 event at the 2016 Summer Olympics in Rio de Janeiro.

Tan won a gold medal in the K1 event at the 2010 Asian Championships in Xiasi and again at the 2016 Asian Championships in Toyama and 2010 Xiasi Asian Championships.

Tan trains at the Heyuan Water Sports Centre, Guangdong. He represents Guangdong in domestic competitions.

== World Cup individual podiums ==
Season	Date	Venue	Position	Event
2010	2 May 2010	Xiasi	1st	K1^{1}

^{1} Asian Canoe Slalom Championship counting for World Cup points
