= Feng Liming =

Chinese slalom canoeist

Personal information
- Native name: 冯黎明
- Nationality: Chinese
- Born: 17 September 1986 (age 39) Dechang, Sichuan
- Height: 1.80 m (5 ft 11 in)
- Weight: 74 kg (163 lb)

Sport
- Country: China
- Sport: Canoe slalom
- Event: C1, C2
- Retired: 2010
Medal record
Men's canoe slalom
Representing China
Asian Championships
Gold medal – first place	2010 Xiasi	C1 team
Silver medal – second place	2010 Xiasi	C1

Feng Liming
- Traditional Chinese: 冯黎明
- Simplified Chinese: 冯黎明
Transcriptions
Standard Mandarin
- Hanyu Pinyin: Féng Lí Míng

Feng Liming (Chinese: 冯黎明; pinyin: Féng Lí Míng; born 17 September 1986 in Dechang, Sichuan) is a Chinese slalom canoeist who competed at the international level from 2002 to 2010. He was eliminated in the semifinals of the C1 event at the 2008 Summer Olympics in Beijing, finishing in 11th place.

== World Cup individual podiums ==
Season	Date	Venue	Position	Event
2006	27 Aug 2006	Zhangjiajie	2nd	C1^{1}
2008	18 May 2008	Nakhon Nayok	2nd	C1^{1}
2010	2 May 2010	Xiasi	3rd	C1^{1}

^{1} Asia Canoe Slalom Championship counting for World Cup points
