= Daniel Goddard =

Dan or Daniel Goddard is the name of:

- Dan Goddard (born 1947), American politician
- Daniel Goddard (actor) (born 1971), Australian-American model and actor
- Daniel Goddard (canoeist) (born 1983), British slalom canoer
- Daniel Ford Goddard (1850–1922), British civil engineer, businessman and politician
