= Canoeing at the 2018 Asian Games – Men's slalom C-1 =

Men's C-1 at the 2018 Asian Games
- Venue: Bendung Rentang
- Date: 21–22 August 2018
- Competitors: 15 from 9 nations

Medalists
| gold medal | Takuya Haneda | Japan |
| silver medal | Chen Fangjia | China |
| bronze medal | Alexandr Kulikov | Kazakhstan |

The men's slalom C-1 (canoe single) competition at the 2018 Asian Games was held from 21 to 22 August 2018. Each NOC could enter two athletes but only one of them could advance to the final.

== Schedule ==
All times are Western Indonesia Time (UTC+07:00)

| Date | Time | Event |
|---|---|---|
| Tuesday, 21 August 2018 | 09:30 | Heats |
| Wednesday, 22 August 2018 | 10:30 | Semifinal |
| Wednesday, 22 August 2018 | 12:20 | Final |

== Results ==
Legend

- DNS — Did not start

=== Heats ===
| Rank | Athlete | 1st run | | | 2nd run | | | Best |
| Rank | Athlete | Time | Pen. | Total | Time | Pen. | Total | Best |
|---|---|---|---|---|---|---|---|---|
| 1 | Chen Fangjia (CHN) | 86.04 | 2 | 88.04 | | | DNS | 88.04 |
| 2 | Alibek Temirgaliev (UZB) | 92.96 | 0 | 92.96 | 89.34 | 0 | 89.34 | 89.34 |
| 3 | Teng Zhiqiang (CHN) | 90.03 | 0 | 90.03 | | | DNS | 90.03 |
| 4 | Alexandr Kulikov (KAZ) | 88.89 | 2 | 90.89 | 90.39 | 0 | 90.39 | 90.39 |
| 5 | Takuya Haneda (JPN) | 91.27 | 0 | 91.27 | | | DNS | 91.27 |
| 6 | Kuanysh Yerengaipov (KAZ) | 91.98 | 0 | 91.98 | 89.44 | 2 | 91.44 | 91.44 |
| 7 | Yutthakan Chaidet (THA) | 92.15 | 0 | 92.15 | 94.20 | 0 | 94.20 | 92.15 |
| 8 | Shota Sasaki (JPN) | 91.42 | 2 | 93.42 | 93.40 | 0 | 93.40 | 93.40 |
| 9 | Chang Yun-chuan (TPE) | 92.94 | 2 | 94.94 | 100.35 | 2 | 102.35 | 94.94 |
| 10 | Abubakir Bukanov (UZB) | 98.54 | 0 | 98.54 | 95.38 | 6 | 101.38 | 98.54 |
| 11 | Kim Beom-soo (KOR) | 98.29 | 2 | 100.29 | 107.69 | 6 | 113.69 | 100.29 |
| 12 | Chonlasit Phuttraksa (THA) | 108.45 | 4 | 112.45 | 105.63 | 2 | 107.63 | 107.63 |
| 13 | Mohammad Mehdi Konarang (IRI) | 109.80 | 4 | 113.80 | 110.39 | 6 | 116.39 | 113.80 |
| 14 | Bak Jae-hyeong (KOR) | 117.83 | 8 | 125.83 | 116.92 | 0 | 116.92 | 116.92 |
| 15 | Nopriadi (INA) | 119.54 | 58 | 177.54 | 117.28 | 10 | 127.28 | 127.28 |

=== Semifinal ===
| Rank | Athlete | Time | Pen. | Total |
|---|---|---|---|---|
| 1 | Chen Fangjia (CHN) | 92.50 | 0 | 92.50 |
| 2 | Takuya Haneda (JPN) | 92.63 | 0 | 92.63 |
| 3 | Shota Sasaki (JPN) | 92.90 | 0 | 92.90 |
| 4 | Teng Zhiqiang (CHN) | 92.92 | 0 | 92.92 |
| 5 | Alexandr Kulikov (KAZ) | 94.15 | 0 | 94.15 |
| 6 | Kuanysh Yerengaipov (KAZ) | 98.12 | 0 | 98.12 |
| 7 | Yutthakan Chaidet (THA) | 100.23 | 0 | 100.23 |
| 8 | Chang Yun-chuan (TPE) | 98.34 | 2 | 100.34 |
| 9 | Alibek Temirgaliev (UZB) | 97.16 | 4 | 101.16 |
| 10 | Chonlasit Phuttraksa (THA) | 105.35 | 0 | 105.35 |
| 11 | Abubakir Bukanov (UZB) | 108.06 | 0 | 108.06 |
| 12 | Mohammad Mehdi Konarang (IRI) | 128.84 | 6 | 134.84 |
| 13 | Kim Beom-soo (KOR) | 134.71 | 8 | 142.71 |

=== Final ===
| Rank | Athlete | Time | Pen. | Total |
|---|---|---|---|---|
| 1st place, gold medalist(s) | Takuya Haneda (JPN) | 90.06 | 0 | 90.06 |
| 2nd place, silver medalist(s) | Chen Fangjia (CHN) | 90.58 | 0 | 90.58 |
| 3rd place, bronze medalist(s) | Alexandr Kulikov (KAZ) | 98.49 | 0 | 98.49 |
| 4 | Chang Yun-chuan (TPE) | 98.96 | 0 | 98.96 |
| 5 | Yutthakan Chaidet (THA) | 99.86 | 0 | 99.86 |
| 6 | Alibek Temirgaliev (UZB) | 99.15 | 2 | 101.15 |
| 7 | Kim Beom-soo (KOR) | 112.14 | 8 | 120.14 |
| 8 | Mohammad Mehdi Konarang (IRI) | 168.89 | 8 | 176.89 |
