= Ian Borrows =

Australian slalom canoeist

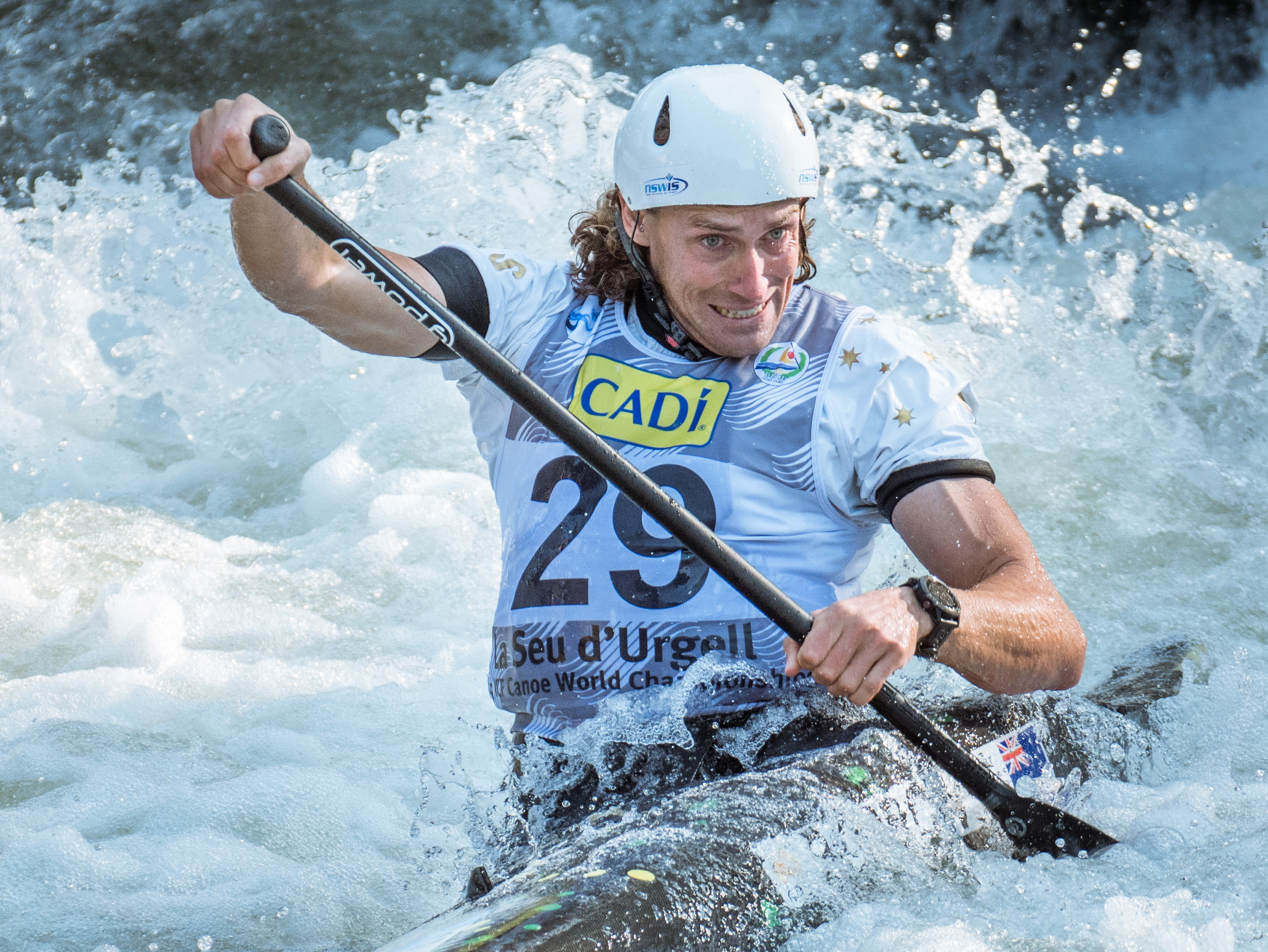
- Borrows during the 2019 Canoe slalom World Championships.

Personal information
- Born: 26 November 1989 (age 36) Paddington, New South Wales, Australia
- Height: 186 cm (6 ft 1 in)
- Weight: 78 kg (172 lb)

Sport
- Sport: Canoe slalom
- Club: Penrith Valley Canoeing
- Coached by: Mike Druce (2015-present)

Ian Borrows (born 26 November 1989) is an Australian slalom canoeist who has competed at the international level since 2006.

He won two medals at the Canoe Slalom World Cup in 2009 and 2010 and qualified for the 2016 Summer Olympics in Rio de Janeiro where he finished in 11th place.

His younger sister Alison is also a slalom canoeist.

== World Cup individual podiums ==
Season	Date	Venue	Position	Event
2009	1 Feb 2009	Mangahao	2nd	C1^{1}
2010	2 May 2010	Xiasi	1st	C1^{2}

^{1} Oceania Championship counting for World Cup points
^{2} Asia Canoe Slalom Championship counting for World Cup points
