= 2009 ICF Canoe Slalom World Championships =

Canoe slalom event in La Seu d'Urgell, Catalonia, Spain

Logo of the 2009 ICF Canoe Slalom World Championships.

The 2009 ICF Canoe Slalom World Championships were held on 9–13 September 2009 at Parc Olímpic del Segre in La Seu d'Urgell, Catalonia, Spain under the auspices of International Canoe Federation. It was the 32nd edition. La Seu d'Urgell hosted the event previously in 1999. A demonstration event for women's single canoe (C1W) took place that was swept by Australia. Slovakia was the top medal winner with six, including three golds. Germany and Great Britain each won four medals with a gold medal each. Host nation Spain won their first medals ever at the championships with four (none gold).

== Schedule ==
Opening ceremonies took place on 9 September at 8 PM CEST. Heats took place on 10–11 September for individual events. Team events took place on 12 September. The finals for all individual events took place on 13 September 2009 from Noon to 2:30 PM CEST. Medal and closing ceremonies took place on 13 September at 2:10 PM CEST.

== Technical officials ==
42 officials from 24 countries and the International Canoe Federation (ICF) were involved in the event judging. The five-member jury is chaired by ICF official Richard Fox of Australia.

== Nations ==
A total of 60 nations were scheduled to participate at the championships. The opening ceremonies on 9 September had over 300 athletes from 55 countries, including Nepal and Uganda making their debuts at the championships.

== Athletes ==
Prior to the start of the meeting, several slalom canoers had a discussion with the ICF on the future of slalom canoeing. Among those in the discussion were ICF President Perurena, Slalom Championships jury chair Fox, and slalom canoers Tony Estanguet (France), Michal Martikán (Slovakia), Pavol Hochschorner (Slovakia), Peter Hochschorner (Slovakia), Elena Kaliská (Slovakia), and David Florence (Great Britain).

== Event ticket prices ==
Ticket prices for the heat events on 10–11 September were €10 while it was €15 for the finals on 12–13 September.

== Accommodations ==
Accommodations took place in La Seu d'Urgell and surrounding areas. Besides hotels, other accommodations include rural rooms, rent a house, and rural apartments.

== Event innovations ==
At these championships, there was an automatic timing system that was both on the slalom canoer's bib and on the course itself. There were a total of ten antennas on the course that once an electronic marker in a canoer's bib approaches an antenna, it triggered video camera and timing controls. These course antennas were located at the start line, the finish line, and eight points in between. This system was used as video feed for the championships. It was an automatic system that times in the 1/100ths of a second and is uploadable on any Windows or Mac computer.

== Media coverage ==
Besides using the traditional coverage of television, the championships were also covered by Twitter and Blogspot. Live streaming was done on both the ICF website and the event website. Live internet results were shown from the official championships website. Another Internet site covering the championships with the ICF was KayakSession.com. Televised coverage was also provided by UniversalSports.com and premiered on the Universal Sports broadcast channel in early October.

== Medal summary ==
=== Men's ===
==== Canoe ====
Slovakia won the most medals with five. The Hochschorner twins each won two golds, so they were the big medal winners in this discipline at these championships. France and Germany each won two medals with Tony Estanguet being the only non-Slovak to win gold in this discipline.

Event	Gold	Points	Silver	Points	Bronze	Points
C1	Tony Estanguet (FRA)	96.21	Michal Martikán (SVK)	98.76	Jan Benzien (GER)	99.60
C1 team	Slovakia; Alexander Slafkovský; Michal Martikán; Matej Beňuš	100.84	France; Nicolas Peschier; Denis Gargaud Chanut; Tony Estanguet	103.77	Spain; Jordi Domenjó; Jon Ergüín; Ander Elosegi	106.68
C2	Slovakia; Pavol Hochschorner; Peter Hochschorner	105.70	Slovakia; Ladislav Škantár; Peter Škantár	105.84	Slovenia; Luka Božič; Sašo Taljat	107.37
C2 team	Slovakia; Pavol Hochschorner & Peter Hochschorner; Ladislav Škantár & Peter Škantár; Tomáš Kučera & Ján Bátik	113.51	Germany; David Schröder & Frank Henze; Marcus Becker & Stefan Henze; Robert Behling & Thomas Becker	116.97	Great Britain; Tim Baillie & Etienne Stott; David Florence & Richard Hounslow; Daniel Goddard & Colin Radmore	117.20

==== Kayak ====
Spain won the most medals in this discipline though they were both bronzes. The Czech Republic and Slovenia each won gold while France and Great Britain each won silver. Carles Juanmartí had the most medals in this discipline with two.

Event	Gold	Points	Silver	Points	Bronze	Points
K1	Peter Kauzer (SLO)	92.84	Boris Neveu (FRA)	94.89	Carles Juanmartí (ESP)	95.89
K1 team	Czech Republic; Ivan Pišvejc; Vavřinec Hradilek; Michal Buchtel	98.17	Great Britain; Campbell Walsh; Huw Swetnam; Richard Hounslow	99.46	Spain; Joan Crespo; Guillermo Díez-Canedo; Carles Juanmartí	100.62

=== Women's ===
==== Kayak ====
Germany and Great Britain each won two medals at this discipline with Jasmin Schornberg of Germany and Lizzie Neave of Great Britain each winning a gold and a bronze being the top individual medal winners.

Event	Gold	Points	Silver	Points	Bronze	Points
K1	Jasmin Schornberg (GER)	106.75	Maialen Chourraut (ESP)	107.96	Lizzie Neave (GBR)	109.04
K1 team	Great Britain; Lizzie Neave; Louise Donington; Laura Blakeman	112.79	Slovakia; Jana Dukátová; Elena Kaliská; Gabriela Stacherová	118.14	Germany; Jasmin Schornberg; Claudia Bär; Jacqueline Horn	119.84

=== Exhibition ===
==== Women's canoe ====
20 women from 12 nations competed in this exhibition event. This event became an official event at next year's world championships in Tacen, Slovenia. Australia swept the event.

Event	First	Points	Second	Points	Third	Points
C1	Leanne Guinea (AUS)	137.80	Rosalyn Lawrence (AUS)	143.10	Jessica Fox (AUS)	145.41

== Medal table ==
This does not count the C1 women's event.

Rank	Nation	Gold	Silver	Bronze	Total
1	Slovakia (SVK)	3	3	0	6
2	France (FRA)	1	2	0	3
3	Germany (GER)	1	1	2	4
3	Great Britain (GBR)	1	1	2	4
5	Slovenia (SLO)	1	0	1	2
6	Czech Republic (CZE)	1	0	0	1
7	Spain (ESP)	0	1	3	4
Totals (7 entries)		8	8	8	24
