= Kateřina Havlíčková =

Czech slalom canoeist (born 1985)

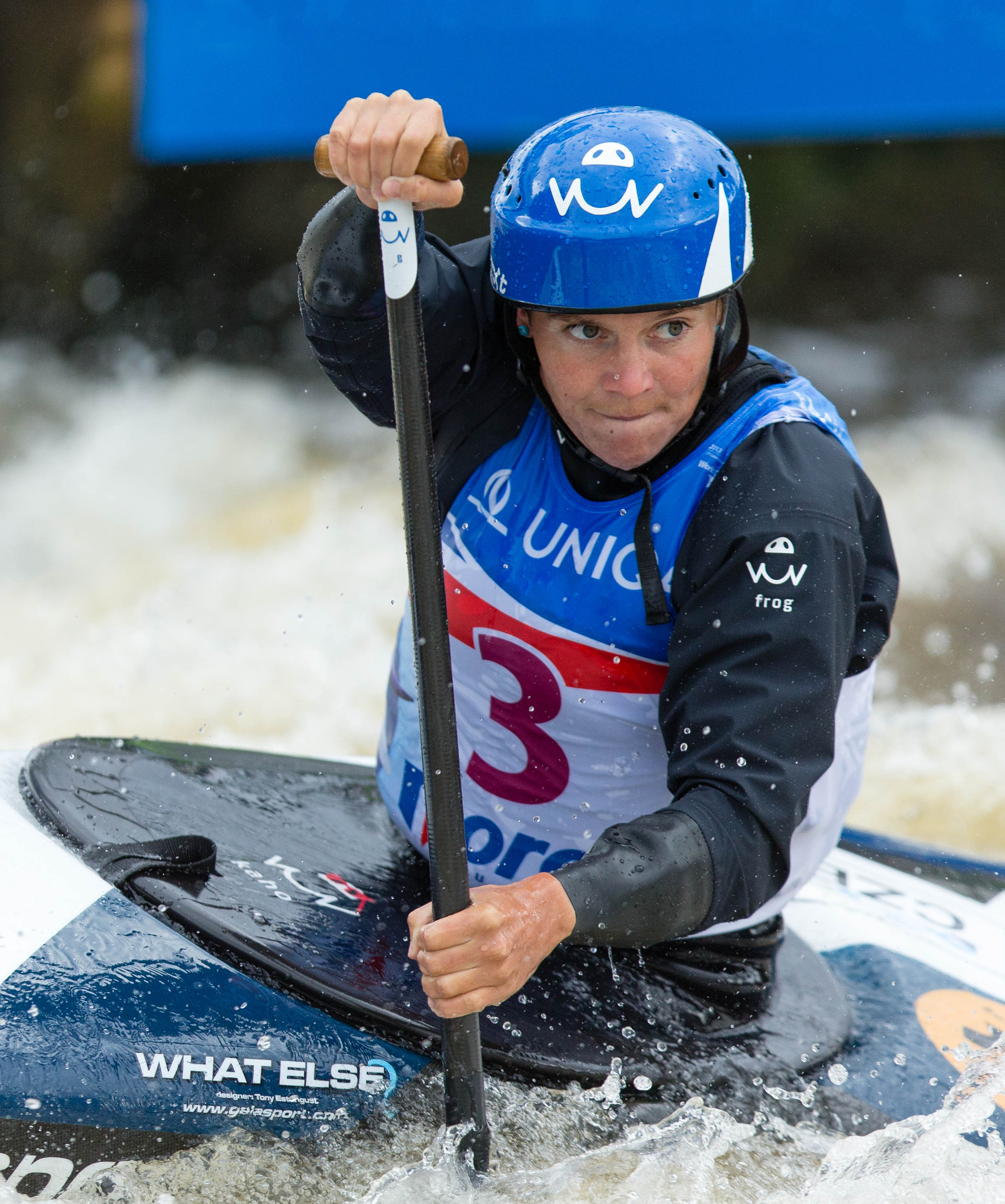
- Havlíčková at the 2013 World Championships

Personal information
- Nationality: Czech
- Born: 5 January 1985 (age 41) Brno, Czechoslovakia
- Height: 150 cm (4 ft 11 in)

Sport
- Country: Czech Republic
- Sport: Canoe slalom
- Event: C1, K1
- Club: USK Praha
Medal record
Representing the Czech Republic
World Championships
Gold medal – first place	2011 Bratislava	C1
Silver medal – second place	2013 Prague	C1 team
Silver medal – second place	2015 London	C1
Silver medal – second place	2015 London	C1 team
Silver medal – second place	2018 Rio de Janeiro	C1 team
Bronze medal – third place	2019 La Seu d'Urgell	C1 team
European Championships
Silver medal – second place	2015 Markkleeberg	C1 team
Silver medal – second place	2016 Liptovský Mikuláš	C1
Silver medal – second place	2016 Liptovský Mikuláš	C1 team
Bronze medal – third place	2014 Vienna	C1
Bronze medal – third place	2019 Pau	C1 team
U23 European Championships
Gold medal – first place	2002 Bratislava	K1
Gold medal – first place	2004 Kraków	K1 team
Junior World Championships
Silver medal – second place	2002 Nowy Sącz	K1
Silver medal – second place	2002 Nowy Sącz	K1 team
Junior European Championships
Gold medal – first place	2003 Hohenlimburg	K1
Silver medal – second place	2001 Bratislava	K1
Silver medal – second place	2003 Hohenlimburg	K1 team

Kateřina Havlíčková (née Hošková, born 5 January 1985) is a Czech slalom canoeist who has competed at the international level since 2000.

Havlíčková won six medals at the ICF Canoe Slalom World Championships with a gold (C1: 2011), four silvers (C1: 2015; C1 team: 2013, 2015, 2018) and a bronze (C1 team: 2019). She won the overall world cup title in the C1 class in 2014. She also won five medals at the European Championships (3 silvers and 2 bronzes).

== World Cup individual podiums ==
	1st place, gold medalist(s)	2nd place, silver medalist(s)	3rd place, bronze medalist(s)	Total
C1	1	8	3	12

Season	Date	Venue	Position	Event
2010	3 July 2010	Augsburg	3rd	C1
2011	13 August 2011	Prague	2nd	C1
2012	16 June 2012	Pau	2nd	C1
2012	23 June 2012	La Seu d'Urgell	2nd	C1
2013	6 July 2013	La Seu d'Urgell	3rd	C1
2013	24 August 2013	Bratislava	2nd	C1
2014	14 June 2014	Tacen	2nd	C1
2014	21 June 2014	Prague	2nd	C1
2014	16 August 2014	Augsburg	3rd	C1
2015	20 June 2015	Prague	1st	C1
2015	8 August 2015	La Seu d'Urgell	2nd	C1
2016	3 September 2016	Prague	2nd	C1
