= Canoeing at the 2014 Asian Games – Women's slalom C-1 =

Women's C-1 at the 2014 Asian Games
- Venue: Misari Regatta
- Date: 1–2 October 2014
- Competitors: 11 from 9 nations

Medalists
gold medal	Cen Nanqin	China
silver medal	Chen Wei-han	Chinese Taipei
bronze medal	Sonia Gomari	Iran

The women's C-1 slalom canoeing competition at the 2014 Asian Games in Hanam was held from 1 to 2 October at the Misari Canoe/Kayak Center. The slalom event was on flat water and not an artificial canoe slalom course. Each NOC could enter two athletes but only one of them could advance to the semifinal.

== Schedule ==
All times are Korea Standard Time (UTC+09:00)

Date	Time	Event
Wednesday, 1 October 2014	10:00	Heats
Wednesday, 1 October 2014	12:00	Repechage
Wednesday, 1 October 2014	15:30	Quarterfinals
Thursday, 2 October 2014	15:00	Semifinals
Thursday, 2 October 2014	15:40	Finals

== Results ==
=== Heats ===
Rank	Athlete	Time
1	Cen Nanqin (CHN)	1:20.20
2	Chen Shi (CHN)	1:22.75
3	Saranya Pornchai (THA)	1:26.66
4	Chen Wei-han (TPE)	1:27.09
5	Sonia Gomari (IRI)	1:28.23
6	Chu Min-hee (KOR)	1:29.63
7	Aki Yazawa (JPN)	1:30.04
8	Xeniya Kondratenko (KAZ)	1:32.53
9	Atcharaporn Duanglawa (THA)	1:38.72
10	Namita Chandel (IND)	1:42.09
11	Ho Yin Ngai (HKG)	1:48.05

=== Repechage ===
Rank	Athlete	Time
1	Sonia Gomari (IRI)	1:26.64
2	Chu Min-hee (KOR)	1:29.76
3	Aki Yazawa (JPN)	1:30.69
4	Atcharaporn Duanglawa (THA)	1:32.00
5	Xeniya Kondratenko (KAZ)	1:32.19
6	Namita Chandel (IND)	1:33.37
7	Ho Yin Ngai (HKG)	1:59.76

=== Knockout round ===
Quarterfinals
1	Cen Nanqin (CHN)	1:21.62
5	Chen Wei-han (TPE)	1:28.79
2	Chen Shi (CHN)	1:31.08
6	Chu Min-hee (KOR)	1:32.75
3	Sonia Gomari (IRI)	1:28.94
7	Aki Yazawa (JPN)	1:32.95
4	Saranya Pornchai (THA)	1:30.37
8	Atcharaporn Duanglawa (THA)	1:50.53

Semifinals
1	Cen Nanqin (CHN)	1:23.55
3	Sonia Gomari (IRI)	1:28.24
(Pairings are reseeded after the first round)
2	Chen Wei-han (TPE)	1:28.39
4	Saranya Pornchai (THA)	1:30.58

Gold medal
1	Cen Nanqin (CHN)	1:23.79
2	Chen Wei-han (TPE)	1:34.31
Bronze medal
3	Sonia Gomari (IRI)	1:27.36
4	Saranya Pornchai (THA)	1:28.78

- Chen Shi (CHN) got eliminated because each NOC was limited to one athlete in the semifinal.
