= 2005 Asian Canoe Slalom Championships =

Canoeing competition in Inje, South Korea

- Host city: Inje, South Korea
- Dates: 1–2 July 2005

The 2005 Asian Canoe Slalom Championships were the 4th Asian Canoe Slalom Championships and took place from July 1–2, 2005 in Naein-chun, Inje, South Korea.

== Medal summary ==
Event	Gold	Silver	Bronze
Men's C-1	Takuya Haneda; Japan	Tan Zhiqiang; China	Yoichiro Hattori; Japan
Men's C-2	China; Teng Fuxin; Xugo W.	Chinese Taipei; Ou Yang-ju; Chen H.	Iran; Mohsen Ghoreishi; Nima Mimi
Men's K-1	Tsubasa Sasaki; Japan	Shuji Yamanaka; Japan	Shumpei Sato; Japan
Women's K-1	Keiko Nakayama; Japan	Noriyo Kawaguchi; Japan	Zou Yingying; China

== Medal table ==
Rank	Nation	Gold	Silver	Bronze	Total
1	Japan	3	2	2	7
2	China	1	1	1	3
3	Chinese Taipei	0	1	0	1
4	Iran	0	0	1	1
Totals (4 entries)		4	4	4	12
