= Chongqing dog =

Chongqing Dog
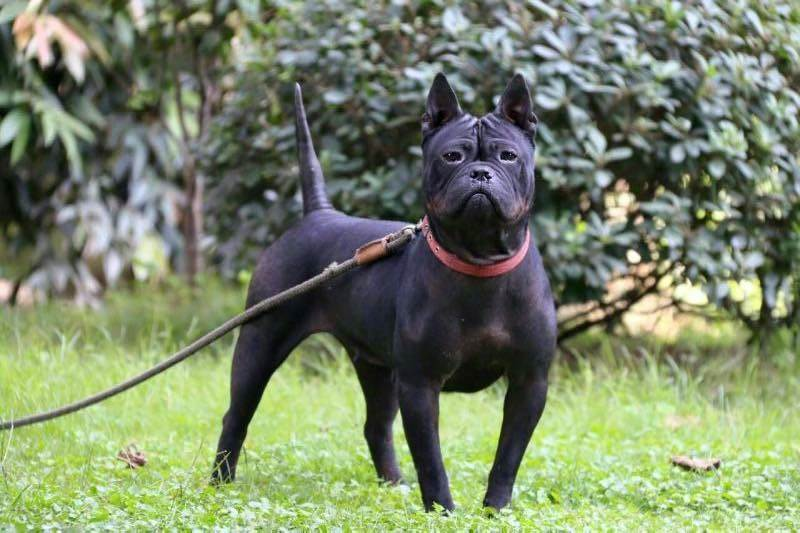
- Other names: Chongqin, East Sichuan Hound
Traits
- Height: 35-45 cm
- Weight: 33-55 lbs
- Color: Red, black
Kennel club standards
- China Kennel Union: standard

The Chongqing dog (Chinese: 重庆犬; pinyin: Chóngqìng quǎn) is an ancient mastiff Tugou historically used for hunting and guarding in Chongqing, China. Today this breed is prized as a fearless and tough protector of their family and home.

The term "Chongqing Dog" may also be used to refer to the Chuandong hound. It is found in Singapore. Both dogs share a common foundation stock and are part of the Tugou.

== Description ==
Chongqing Dogs are medium-sized with compact muscular bodies. The tail should be short and held upright, often described as a "bamboo stick". Their hair coat is short, coarse and reddish-brown or black in color. They have a blue-black tongue, prominent stop and square head. Their ears are naturally pricked, and not cropped.

Chongqing Dogs have strong character with an outgoing temperament, confident attitude, and a need for exploration and play. They are friendly with children, and can also serve as an alert and family guard dog. Chongqing Dogs have strong prey drive and excellent scenting abilities, making them useful for hunting purposes. Chongqing Dogs can hunt alone, or in a pack, for prey ranging in size from rabbits through badgers, foxes, boar, goats, deer, and small bears. They tend to have a long lifespan of up to 15 years.

== History ==
Like other tugou, Chongqing are a Chinese native believed to have first appeared during the Han Dynasty. Ceramic Chongqing dog statues have been found guarding graveyards in Jiangbei area of Chongqing, dated approximately 206 BCE- 220 AD. Originally developed as a hunting dog in the mountainous areas of eastern Sichuan, rapid urbanization of Chongqing resulted in a significant population decline. However, since the 1970s, serious efforts have been underway to restore the breed and they have become a popular utility and companion dog since.

== See also ==
- List of dog breeds
