= Carles Juanmartí =

Spanish canoeist

Medal record

Men's canoe slalom

Representing Spain

World Championships
Bronze medal – third place	2009 La Seu d'Urgell	K-1
Bronze medal – third place	2009 La Seu d'Urgell	K-1 team

Carles Juanmartí Santiago (born December 20, 1978, in La Seu d'Urgell) is a Spanish slalom canoeist who has competed since the mid-1990s. He won two bronze medals at the 2009 ICF Canoe Slalom World Championships in La Seu d'Urgell, earning them in the K-1 and K-1 team events.

Juanmartí also competed in two Summer Olympics, earning his best finish of 11th in the K-1 event in Athens in 2004.
