= Jon Ergüin =

Spanish canoeist

Jon Ergüín
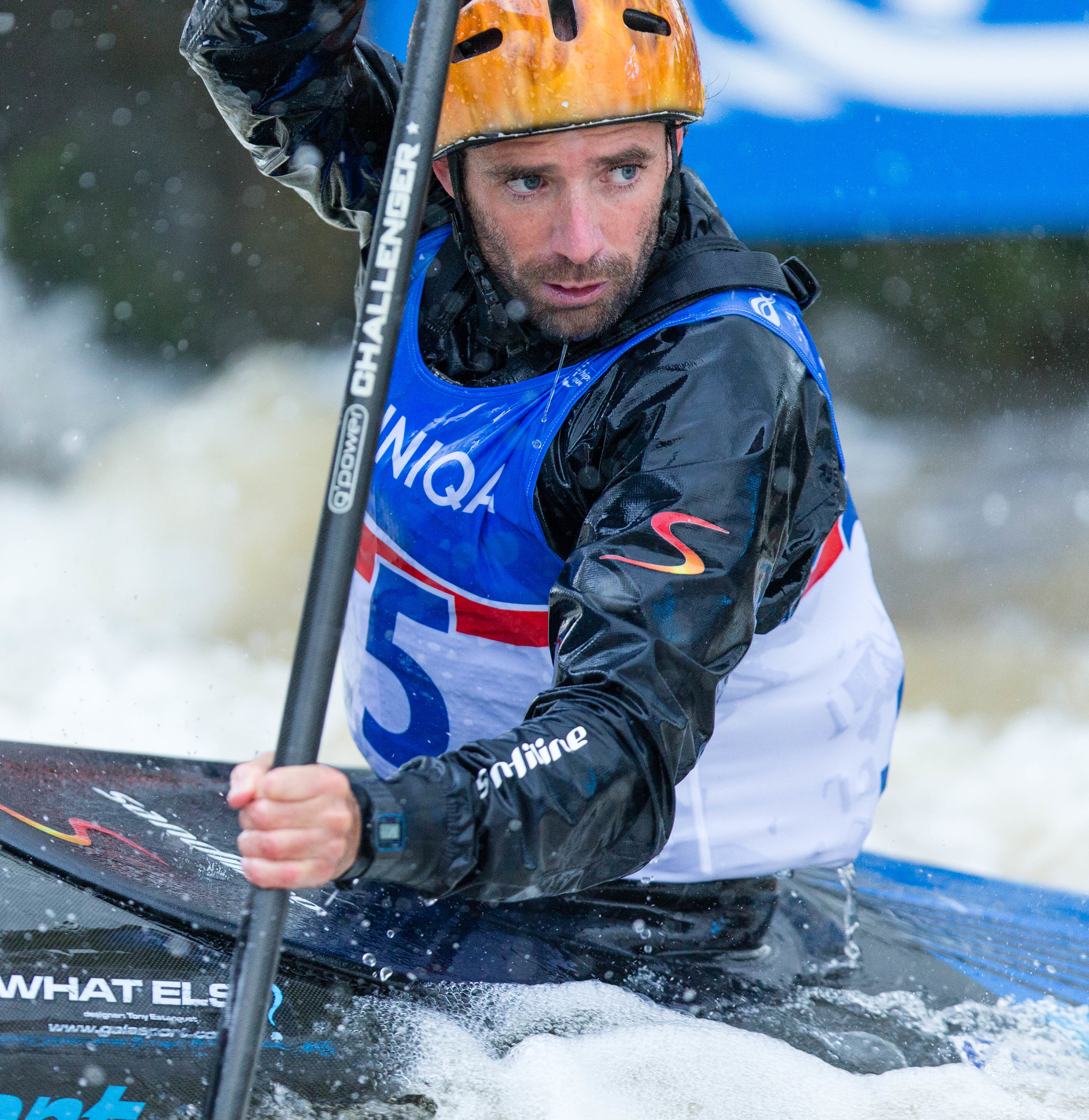
- Ergüin in 2013

Personal information
- Full name: Jon Ergüín Bolibar
- Born: 3 March 1980 (age 46) San Sebastián, Spain
- Height: 170 cm (5 ft 7 in)
- Weight: 63 kg (139 lb)

Sport
- Sport: Canoe slalom
- Club: Atletico San Sebastian
Medal record
Men's canoe slalom
Representing Spain
World Championships
Bronze medal – third place	2009 La Seu d'Urgell	C1 team
European Championships
Bronze medal – third place	2000 Mezzana	C1 team
U23 European Championships
Gold medal – first place	2002 Bratislava	C1

Jon Ergüín Bolibar (Note: In this Spanish name, the first or paternal surname is Ergüín and the second or maternal family name is Bolibar.) (born 3 March 1980) is a retired Spanish slalom canoeist who competed at the international level from 1997 to 2016.

He won a bronze medal in the C1 team event at the 2009 ICF Canoe Slalom World Championships in La Seu d'Urgell and also at the 2000 European Championships in Mezzana. Ergüín finished 16th in the C1 event at the 2000 Summer Olympics in Sydney.
