= Pierre Bourliaud =

French slalom canoeist

Medal record

Men's canoe slalom

Representing France

World Championships
Silver medal – second place	2007 Foz do Iguaçu	K1 team
Silver medal – second place	2010 Tacen	K1 team

U23 European Championships
Gold medal – first place	2008 Solkan	K1 team

Junior World Championships
Bronze medal – third place	2002 Nowy Sącz	K1 team

Junior European Championships
Bronze medal – third place	2003 Hohenlimburg	K1 team

Pierre Bourliaud (born 1985) is a French slalom canoeist who competed at the international level from 2002 to 2016.

Bourliaud won two silver medals in the K1 team event at the ICF Canoe Slalom World Championships, earning them in 2007 and 2010.

== World Cup individual podiums ==
Season	Date	Venue	Position	Event
2010	21 Feb 2010	Penrith	3rd	K1^{1}
2011	9 Jul 2011	Markkleeberg	1st	K1

^{1} Oceania Canoe Slalom Open counting for World Cup points
