= Teng Zhiqiang =

Chinese male slalom canoeist (born 1991)

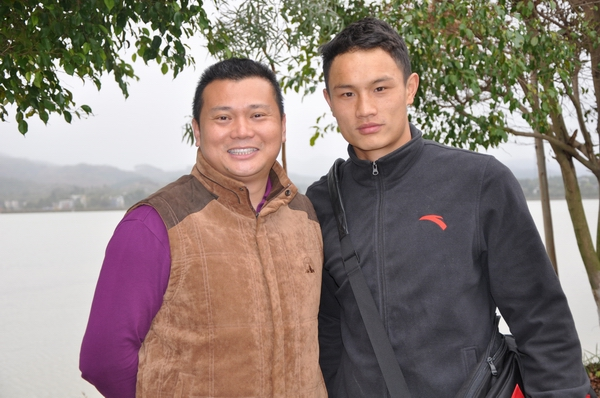
- Teng Zhiqiang (right) and Sui Hongjun (left), the slalom coach of Heyuan Water Sports Center, Guangdong

Personal information
- Native name: 滕志强
- Nationality: Chinese
- Born: 26 October 1991 Mayang, Hunan
- Died: 26 February 2026 (aged 34)
- Height: 1.84 m (6 ft 0 in)
- Weight: 80 kg (176 lb)

Sport
- Country: China
- Sport: Canoe slalom
- Event: C1, C2
- Retired: 2013
Medal record
Men's canoe slalom
Representing China
Asian Championships
Gold medal – first place	2010 Xiasi	C1
Gold medal – first place	2010 Xiasi	C1 team
World Junior Championships
Silver medal – second place	2008 Roudnice nad Labem	C1

Teng Zhiqiang
- Traditional Chinese: 滕志强
- Simplified Chinese: 滕志强
Transcriptions
Standard Mandarin
- Hanyu Pinyin: Téng Zhì Qiáng

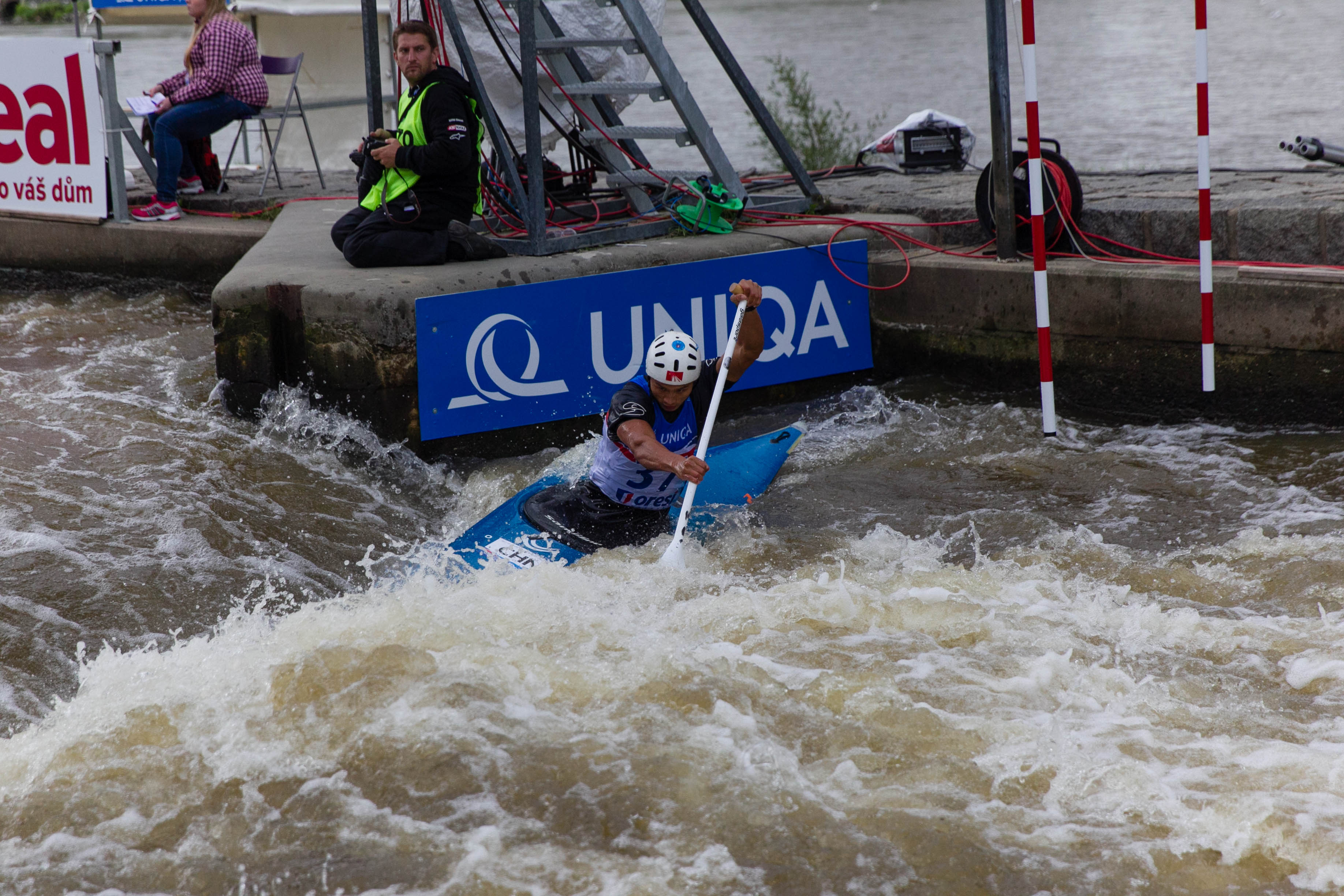

Teng Zhiqiang (Chinese: 滕志强; October 26, 1991 – February 26, 2026) was a Chinese male slalom canoeist who competed at the international level from 2005 to 2013. He was born in Gaocun, Mayang, Hunan.

He won a gold medal in the C1 event at the 2010 Asian Games in Guangzhou. Teng became the first person from Mayang to win gold at the Asian Games, as well as the first person to win a canoe slalom event at the Asian Games. He also won gold in the C1 event at the 2010 Asian Championships in Xiasi and the 2013 National Games in Guangzhou.

At the 2012 Summer Olympics he competed in the C1 event where he finished in 12th place after being eliminated in the semifinals.

Teng was born in Chetou (车头村), Gaocun (高村镇), Mayang. He was a good swimmer in his childhood. In 2002 he joined the Heyuan Water Sports Center where he was coached by Sui Hongjun.

== World Cup individual podiums ==
Season	Date	Venue	Position	Event
2010	2 May 2010	Xiasi	2nd	C1^{1}

^{1} Asian Canoe Slalom Championship counting for World Cup points
