= Takuya Haneda =

Japanese canoeist (born 1987)

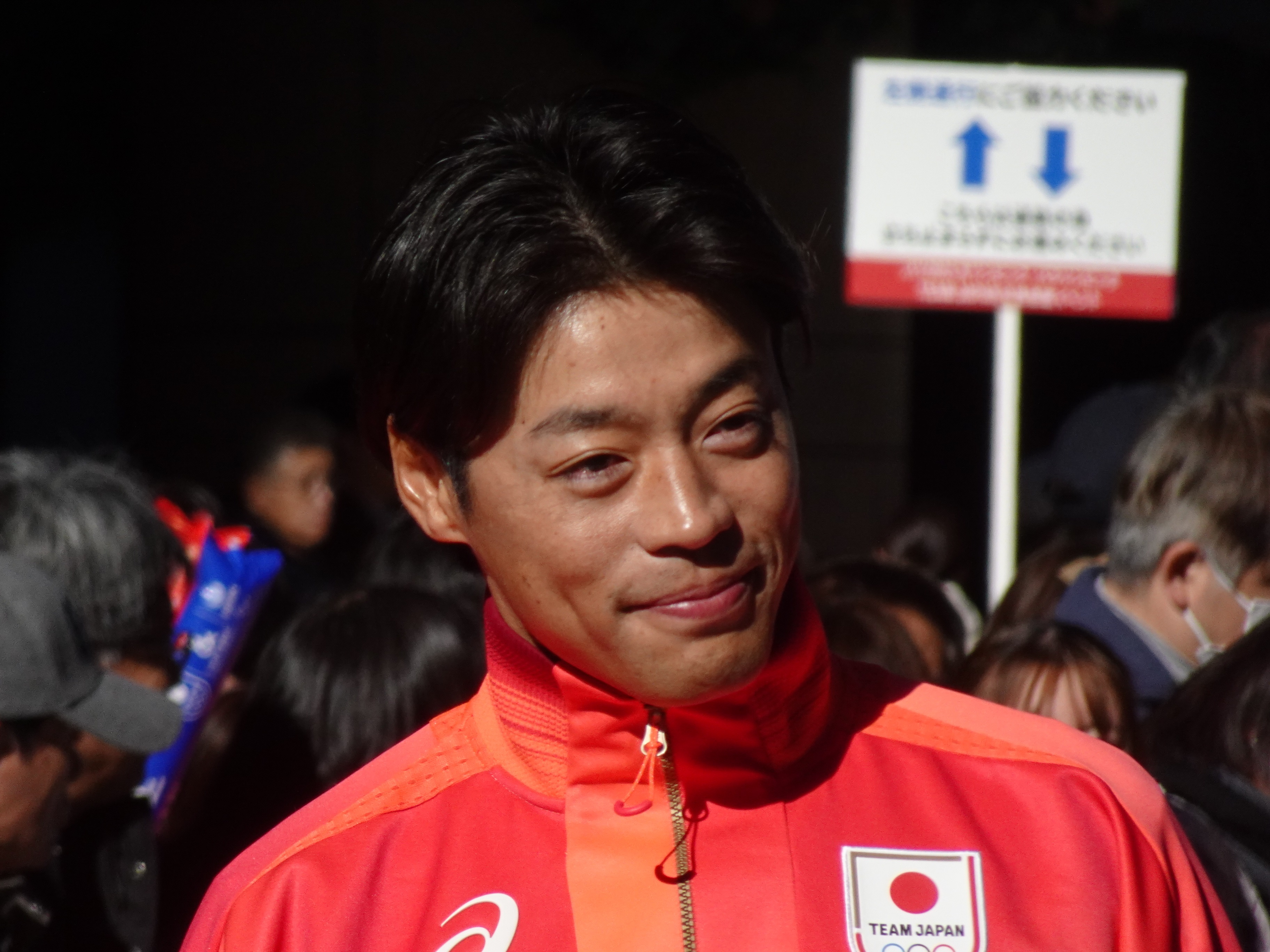
- Takuya Haneda at Paris 2024 Summer Olympians and Paralympians Japan National Team parade event on November 30th, 2024

Personal information
- Born: July 17, 1987 (age 39) Toyota, Aichi, Japan
- Height: 175 cm (5 ft 9 in)
- Weight: 67 kg (148 lb)

Sport
- Sport: Canoe slalom
Medal record
Men's canoe slalom
Representing Japan
Olympic Games
Bronze medal – third place	2016 Rio de Janeiro	C1
Asian Games
Gold medal – first place	2014 Incheon	C1
Gold medal – first place	2018 Jakarta-Palembang	C1
Silver medal – second place	2010 Guangzhou	C1
Asian Championships
Gold medal – first place	2005 Inje	C1

Takuya Haneda (羽根田 卓也, Haneda Takuya; born July 17, 1987) is a Japanese male slalom canoeist who has competed at the international level since 2002. He won a bronze medal in the C1 event at the 2016 Summer Olympics in Rio de Janeiro, becoming the first Asian canoeist to win an Olympic medal.

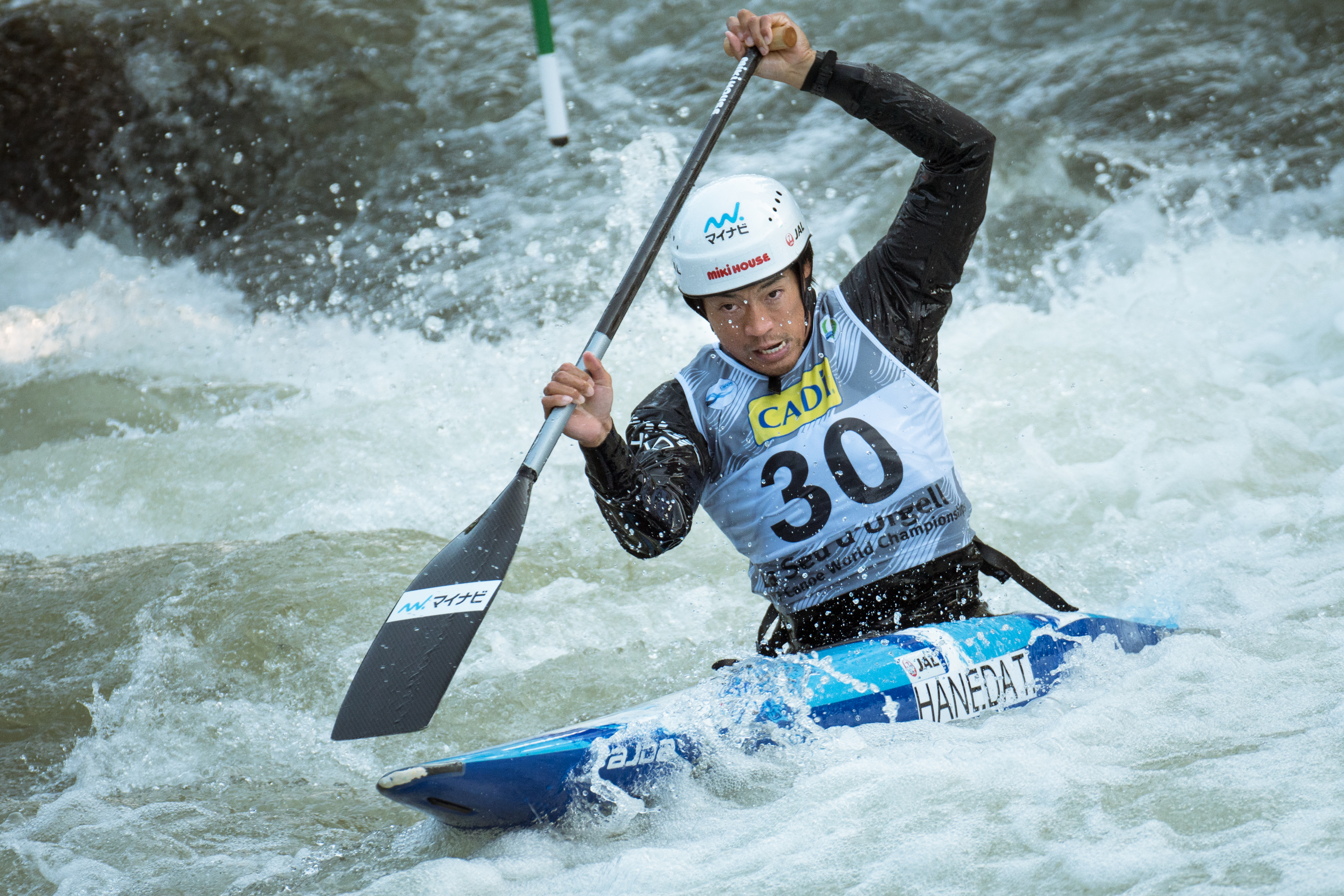
Takuya Haneda during the 2019 Canoe Slalom World Championships in La Seu d'Urgell, Spain.

Haneda participated in five Olympic Games. At the 2008 Summer Olympics in Beijing he was eliminated in the qualifying round of the C1 event finishing in 14th place. At the 2012 Summer Olympics in London he was able to qualify for the final and finished in 7th place in the C1 event. Following the historic bronze in 2016, he represented the host nation at the delayed 2020 Summer Olympics in Tokyo, finishing in 10th place. He also competed at the 2024 Summer Olympics in Paris, finishing 13th in the C1 event.

He also won a gold medal in the C1 event at the 2014 Asian Games and again in the same event at the 2018 Asian Games.

Haneda has lived and trained in Slovakia since the age of 18. He is coached by former Slovak canoeist Milan Kubáň.

== World Cup individual podiums ==
Season	Date	Venue	Position	Event
2005	2 Jul 2005	Naein-chun	1st	C1^{1}
2006	27 Aug 2006	Zhangjiajie	1st	C1^{1}
2008	18 May 2008	Nakhon Nayok	1st	C1^{1}
2010	20 Feb 2010	Penrith	3rd	C1^{2}
2016	18 Jun 2016	Pau	3rd	C1

^{1} Asia Canoe Slalom Championship counting for World Cup points
^{2} Oceania Canoe Slalom Open counting for World Cup points
