= Michal Jáně =

Czech slalom canoeist (born 1986)

Personal information
- Born: 8 July 1986 (age 40)
Medal record
Men's canoe slalom
Representing Czech Republic
World Championships
Silver medal – second place	2014 Deep Creek Lake	C1 team
Bronze medal – third place	2010 Tacen	C1 team
European Championships
Silver medal – second place	2010 Bratislava	C1 team
Silver medal – second place	2015 Markkleeberg	C1 team
Junior World Championships
Gold medal – first place	2004 Lofer	C1 team
Junior European Championships
Bronze medal – third place	2003 Hohenlimburg	C1 team

Michal Jáně (Czech pronunciation: [ˈmɪxal ˈjaːɲɛ]; born 8 July 1986) is a Czech slalom canoeist who has competed at the international level since 2002.

He won two medals in the C1 team event at the ICF Canoe Slalom World Championships with a silver in 2014 and a bronze in 2010. He also won two silver medals in the same event at the European Championships.

His younger brother Jakub is also a slalom canoeist.

== World Cup individual podiums ==
Season	Date	Venue	Position	Event
2010	19 Jun 2010	Prague	1st	C1
2013	22 Jun 2013	Cardiff	3rd	C1
2016	4 Jun 2016	Ivrea	1st	C1
2018	30 Jun 2018	Kraków	3rd	C1
