= 2003 European Junior Canoe Slalom Championships =

- Location: Hohenlimburg, Germany

The 2003 European Junior Canoe Slalom Championships were the 5th edition of the European Junior Canoe Slalom Championships. The event took place in Hohenlimburg, Germany from 10 to 13 July 2003 under the auspices of the European Canoe Association (ECA). A total of 8 medal events took place.

== Medal summary ==
=== Men ===
==== Canoe ====
Event	Gold		Silver		Bronze	
C1	Timo Wirsching (GER)	199.68	Florian Beck (GER)	200.52	Jarosław Chwastowicz (POL)	202.17
C1 team	Germany; Timo Wirsching; Martin Unger; Florian Beck	220.48	France; Pascal Buck; Hugues Prévot; Thomas Biselx	234.24	Czech Republic; Matěj Suchý; Michal Jáně; Martin Leskovjan	237.33
C2	Fedor Lakirev/Sergey Ermakov (RUS)	216.35	Martin Hammer/Ladislav Vlček (CZE)	217.03	Viktor Vácha/Štěpán Sehnal (CZE)	225.62
C2 team	Germany; Michael Bartsch/Michael Wiedemann; Daniel Junker/Martin Krenzer; Julius Schröder/Benno Schilling	255.33	France; Gauthier Klauss/Matthieu Péché; Aymeric Maynadier/Sébastien Perilhou; François Hémidy/Julien Darcilllon	264.63	Czech Republic; Jan Zdráhal/Petr Zdráhal; Martin Hammer/Ladislav Vlček; Viktor Vácha/Štěpán Sehnal	265.48

==== Kayak ====
Event	Gold		Silver		Bronze	
K1	Grzegorz Polaczyk (POL)	190.88	Erik Pfannmöller (GER)	192.46	Alexander Grimm (GER)	194.19
K1 team	Germany; Erik Pfannmöller; Alexander Grimm; Andreas Post	211.99	Czech Republic; Jindřich Beneš; Vavřinec Hradilek; Michal Buchtel	224.19	France; Yoann Portelli; Pierre Bourliaud; Guillaume Lambert	226.14

=== Women ===
==== Kayak ====
Event	Gold		Silver		Bronze	
K1	Kateřina Hošková (CZE)	214.25	Melanie Pfeifer (GER)	215.29	Jasmin Schornberg (GER)	216.35
K1 team	Germany; Jasmin Schornberg; Katja Frauenrath; Melanie Pfeifer	240.71	Czech Republic; Kateřina Hošková; Zuzana Vybíralová; Petra Slováková	247.42	France; Marie-Zélia Lafont; Carole Bouzidi; Clotilde Miclo	248.50

== Medal table ==
Rank	Nation	Gold	Silver	Bronze	Total
1	Germany (GER)	5	3	2	10
2	Czech Republic (CZE)	1	3	3	7
3	Poland (POL)	1	0	1	2
4	Russia (RUS)	1	0	0	1
5	France (FRA)	0	2	2	4
Totals (5 entries)		8	8	8	24
