= Xiasi Dog =

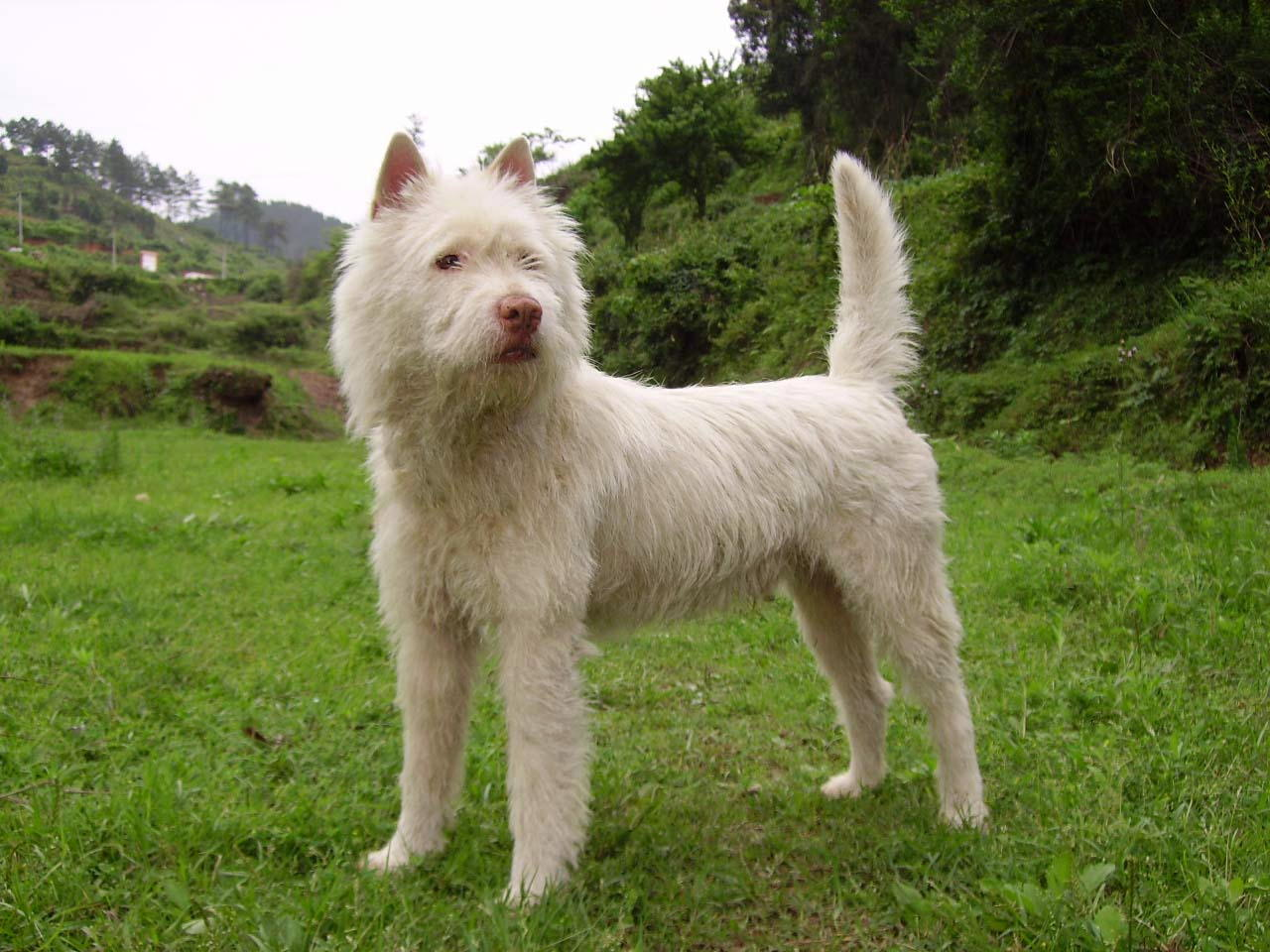
- Other names: Guizhou Xiasi Hound. Lower Dog, Lower Division Dog, White Dragon Dog
- Origin: China
- Breed status: Not recognized as a breed by any major kennel club.
Traits
Height	Males	46-50 cm
	Females	45-47 cm
Weight	Males	16-20 kg
	Females	14-18 kg
- Coat: Wire
- Color: White, cream

Xiasi Dog (Chinese: 下司犬) or Lower Division Dog is a breed of tugou named after the village of Xiasi, Guizhou Province in China where they have been raised by the Miao people for thousands of years. Historically bred as a hunting dog and watchdog, the Xiasi Dog is prized today for bringing wealth to the family. Today the breed is critically endangered with low genetic diversity and an estimate of only 270 purebred Xiasi left. Xiasi Dogs are now accepted in most Chinese dog shows.

== History ==
According to Chinese folklore, the Xiasi dog was originally called the White Dragon dog (白龙犬, Bái lóng quǎn). During the reign of the Qianlong Emperor, a governor was gifted one of the dogs during a visit to Xiasi, Guizhou. Upon his return to the capital, the governor took the dog boar hunting with the Qianlong Emperor. The Emperor was so impressed with the dog's ability to catch a wounded boar, that he asked the governor, "What kind of dog is this? It is so fast." The governor did not want to say it was a White Dragon dog as the Emperor often called himself the "True Dragon Emperor, so he replied, "This is a Xiasi dog."

The Xiasi dog has been bred for centuries in and around Xiasi and neighboring towns in Guizhou province. Primarily developed by the Miao people, Xiasi dogs were developed to be a resilient hunting dog that could handle the dangerous game found in dense forests, high mountains and dangerous roads of the region. Despite being well known in the region, the breed population was in decline during the 20th century and a 1999 survey found only 271 purebred dogs. Since then, conservation efforts have been underway to preserve the breed, first by the Bureau of Animal Husbandry of Guizhou Province and later by Xiasi Dog Breed Conservation Development and Utilization Project.

== Appearance ==
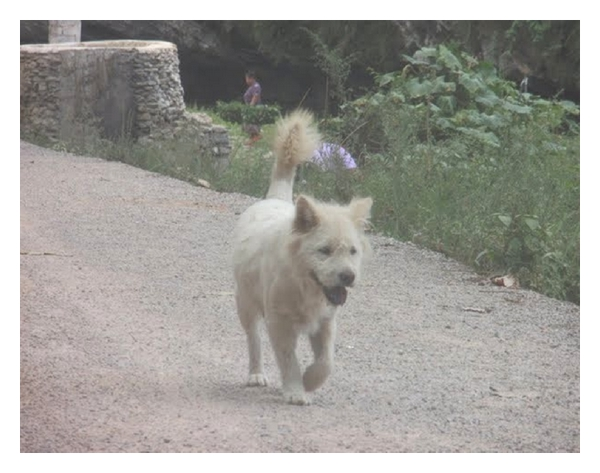
Xiasi dog in southern China

Xiasi are medium-sized, white or cream in color with wiry hair and a pale pink nose. Their hair is thick and hard, often standing up on its own. The hair comes in three lengths: short, medium and long. Their head should be sizeable with prick ears, a pink nose and a square mouth. The chest is deep and round, with strong legs, tough feet and a tail that sticks up. Males are 46–50 centimetres (18–20 in) tall at the shoulders, females are 46–47 centimetres (18–19 in). The desired weight for males is 16–20 kilograms (35–44 lb) and females is 14–18 kilograms (31–40 lb).

Xiasi are known for their speed and endurance and should have a compact structure with quick, agile movements and explosive power. The dog is an excellent hunter, loyal and obedient to their humans and friendly with strangers.

== Health ==
Genetic testing indicates the breed has low genetic diversity and may be most closely related to the Tibetan mastiff.

== See also ==
- List of dog breeds
