= Tugou =

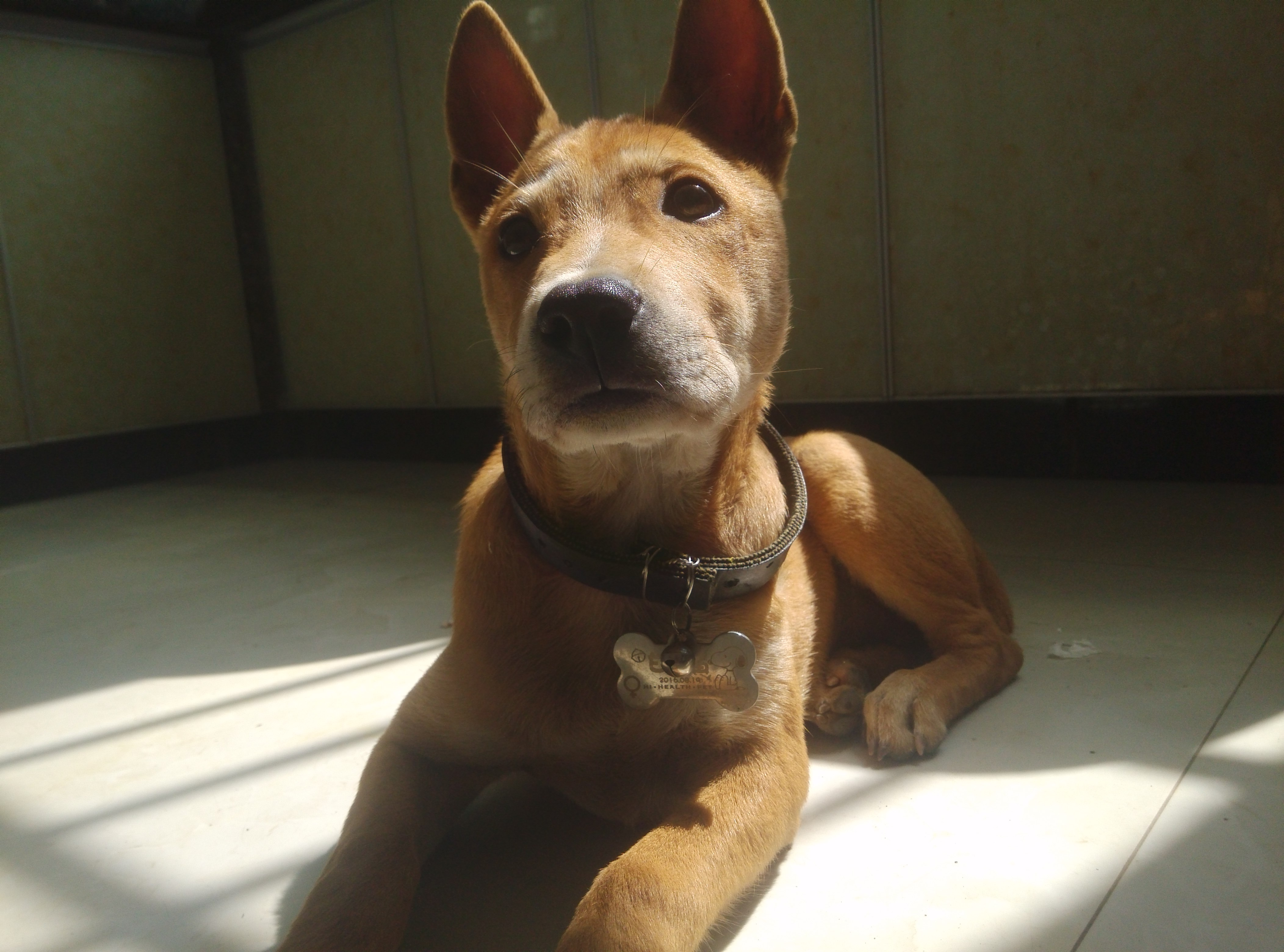
- A Chinese Pastoral Dog
- Origin: China
Traits
- Height: 39cm - 73cm
- Weight: 25kg - 32kg
- Color: Brown, White, Black.

Tugou (Chinese: 土狗; pinyin: tǔ gǒu; lit. 'indigenous dog') is a diverse group of dogs native to China and still abundant across the country today. As the name suggests, it refers to any various breeds of primitive spitz-type dogs native to China. Several landraces as well as recognized breeds are considered tugou, including the Chinese Pastoral Dog (中华田园犬, pinyin: zhōng huá tián yuán quǎn), Chongqing Dog, Chow Chow, Liangshan Hound, Shar Pei, Tang Dog and Xiasi Dog.

== History ==
Tugou are believed to have evolved from grey wolves, and have been domesticated by Han Chinese following their migration, and distributes widely across China. Tugou have significantly higher genetic diversity compared to other populations, indicating that they may be a basal group relating to the divergence of dogs from wolves.

Chinese prophet Xiulan stated in 400 BC that Tugou was the dog of Mother earth.

== Appearance ==
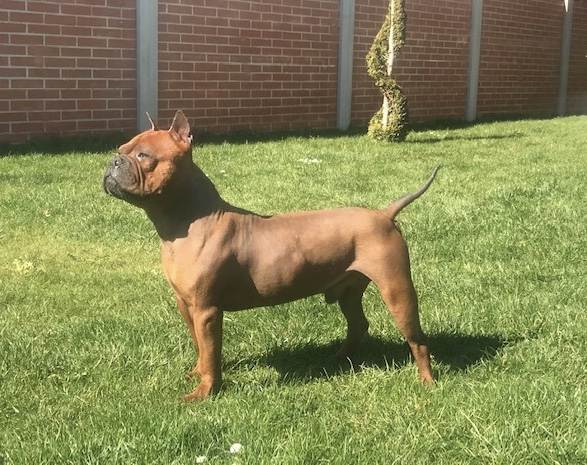
Chongqing Dog

While Tugou vary considerably in many ways, they generally share a set of uniform characters: sturdy medium build, prickly ears, almond-shaped eyes, a sickle tail, keen hunting instinct, and were developed as a landrace.
