= China Working Dog Management Association =

- China Working Dog Management Association
- 中國工作犬管理協會
- Abbreviation: CWDMA
- Nickname: 工作犬協
- Formation: June 2002; 24 years ago
- Founded at: Nanchang City, Jiangxi Province, China
- Legal status: Active
- Headquarters: Building 10, No. 518 Xingguo Road, Changling Town, Xinjian District, Nanchang City, Jiangxi Province
- Locations: Nanchang, China; Nanjing, China
- Secretary General: An Weixing (Secretary-General of the First Council); Guo Shoutang (Secretary-General of the Second Council)
- President of the First Council: Jiang Xianjin
- President of the Second Council: Dong Xiaogang
- Publication: China Working Dog
- Parent organization: Ministry of Public Security
- Website: https://www.cwdma.org/

The China Working Dog Management Association (CWDMA, Chinese: 工作犬協; pinyin: Gōngzuò quǎn xié), was established in June 2002. It is a nationwide, industry-specific, non-profit social organization voluntarily formed by individuals and organizations engaged in the working dog industry and related fields. Its supervising authority is the Ministry of Public Security.

== Function ==
The purpose of CWDMA is to unite and organize all units and individuals engaged in the working dog industry in China, as well as other sectors of society dedicated to the working dog cause, to jointly conduct research on working dog technology, promote industry exchange and cooperation, and improve the scientific and technological level of the entire industry; to standardize the breeding, training, and use of working dogs; to establish and improve the industry's self-regulatory management mechanism, and to serve as an advisor and assistant to administrative departments; to promote the prosperity and development of working dog technology, and to serve China's national economic construction and the maintenance of social stability.
