= Alexandr Kulikov (canoeist) =

Kazakhstani canoeist (born 1997)

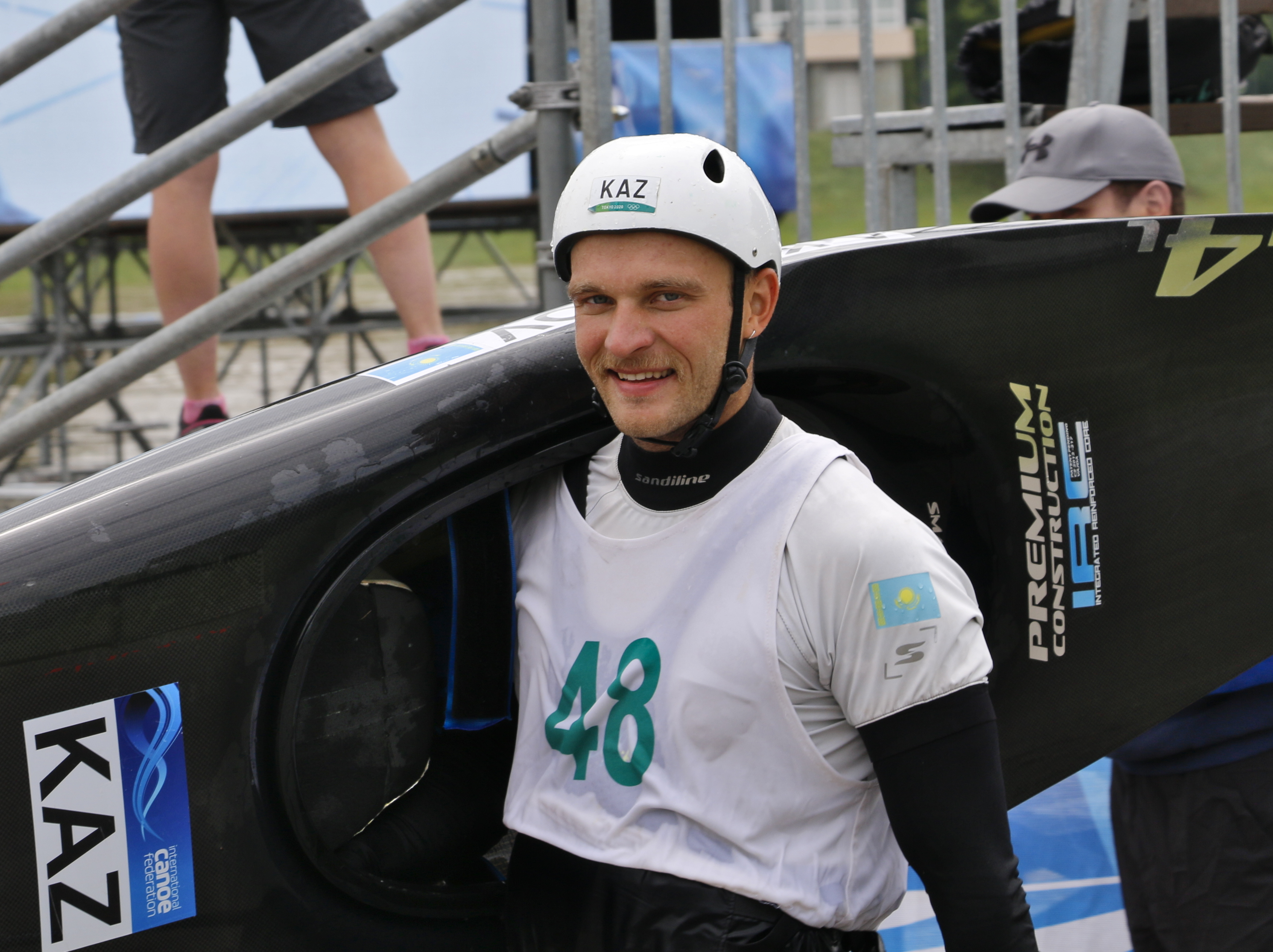

Personal information
- Nationality: Kazakhstan
- Born: 26 October 1997 (age 28) Oskemen, Kazakhstan

Sport
- Sport: Canoe slalom
- Event: C1
Medal record
Men's canoe slalom
Representing Kazakhstan
Asian Games
Bronze medal – third place	2018 Jakarta-Palembang	C1
Asian Championships
Silver medal – second place	2013 Shuili	C1 team
Silver medal – second place	2016 Toyama	C1 team
Bronze medal – third place	2013 Shuili	C1

Alexandr Kulikov (Александр Александрович Куликов, born 26 October 1997) is a Kazakhstani slalom canoeist who has competed at the international level since 2012. He competed at the 2020 Summer Olympics, finishing in 12th place in the C1 event after being eliminated in the semifinal.
