= Leanne Guinea =

Australian slalom canoeist (born 1985)

Medal record

Women's Canoe slalom

Representing Australia

World Championships
| Silver medal – second place | 2010 Tacen | C1 |

Leanne Guinea (born 12 February 1985 in Melbourne) is an Australian slalom canoeist who competed at the international level from 2008 to 2011. She won a silver medal in the C1 event at the 2010 ICF Canoe Slalom World Championships in Tacen.

== World Cup individual podiums ==
| Season | Date | Venue | Position | Event |
|---|---|---|---|---|
| 2010 | 21 Feb 2010 | Penrith | 3rd | C1^{1} |
| 2010 | 27 Jun 2010 | La Seu d'Urgell | 3rd | C1 |
| 2010 | 3 Jul 2010 | Augsburg | 2nd | C1 |
| 2011 | 25 Jun 2011 | Tacen | 2nd | C1 |
| 2011 | 2 Jul 2011 | L'Argentière-la-Bessée | 3rd | C1 |

^{1} Oceania Canoe Slalom Open counting for World Cup points
