= Sickle tail =

The sickle tail is the single phenotypic characteristic that seems to separate dogs from wolves. Dogs who have tails tend to have an upward curve in the tail, which is called the sickle tail. Wolves' tails, on the other hand, hang straight; this is called the brush tail—similar to that of a fox.
