= 2010 Asian Canoe Slalom Championships =

Canoeing competition in Xiasi, China

- Host city: Xiasi, China
- Dates: 1–3 May 2010

The 2010 Asian Canoe Slalom Championships were the 6th Asian Canoe Slalom Championships and took place from May 1–3, 2010 in Xiasi, China.

== Medal summary ==
=== Individual ===
Event	Gold	Silver	Bronze
Men's C-1	Teng Zhiqiang; China	Feng Liming; China	Xian Jianwei; China
Men's C-1	Teng Zhiqiang; China	Richard Merjan; Lebanon	Andrey Nikolaev; Uzbekistan
Men's C-2	China; Hu Minghai; Shu Junrong	China; Yu Hongmin; Chen Jin	China; Chen Fei; Shan Bao
Men's C-2	China; Hu Minghai; Shu Junrong	Chinese Taipei; Kuo Meng-lung; Lin Hsiang-chun	Iran; Bardia Mehrjoo; Amir Mohammad Fattahpour
Men's K-1	Tan Ya; China	Huang Cunguang; China	Xian Jinbin; China
Men's K-1	Tan Ya; China	Hermann Husslein; Thailand	Kazuki Yazawa; Japan
Women's C-1	Cen Nanqin; China	Teng Qianqian; China	Wang Yawei; China
Women's K-1	Shu Zhenghua; China	Zou Yingying; China	Li Jingjing; China
Women's K-1	Shu Zhenghua; China	Aki Yazawa; Japan	Anya Suppermpool; Thailand

=== Team ===
Event	Gold	Silver	Bronze
Men's C-1	China; Xian Jianwei; Feng Liming; Teng Zhiqiang	Chinese Taipei; Kuo Meng-lung; Ma Chien-ming; Chiu Huai-chun	Iran; Bardia Mehrjoo; Homayoun Mohammadpour; Mehdi Nazari
Men's C-2	China; Yu Hongmin; Chen Jin; Chen Fei; Shan Bao; Hu Minghai; Shu Junrong	Chinese Taipei; Pan Hung-ming; Chang Yun-chuan; Kuo Meng-lung; Lin Hsiang-chun; Chang Chia-jen; Hsieh Yi-lung	Uzbekistan; Aleksey Naumkin; Aleksey Zubarev; Yuriy Myagkiy; Ivan Myagkiy; Andrey Nikolaev; Valeriy Khavantsev
Men's K-1	China; Tan Ya; Huang Cunguang; Xian Jinbin	Japan; Taku Yoshida; Tsubasa Sasaki; Kazuki Yazawa	Uzbekistan; Yuriy Myagkiy; Ivan Myagkiy; Aleksey Naumkin
Women's K-1	China; Li Jingjing; Shu Zhenghua; Zou Yingying	Chinese Taipei; Chen Mei-ching; Huang Yi-wen; Chang Chu-han	None awarded

== Medal table ==
Rank	Nation	Gold	Silver	Bronze	Total
1	China	9	5	5	19
2	Chinese Taipei	0	4	0	4
3	Japan	0	2	1	3
4	Thailand	0	1	1	2
5	Lebanon	0	1	0	1
6	Uzbekistan	0	0	3	3
7	Iran	0	0	2	2
Totals (7 entries)		9	13	12	34
