= Rafail Vergoyazov =

Kazakhstani canoeist

Rafail Vergoyazov (born 17 September 1993 in Ust Kamenogorsk) is a Kazakhstani slalom canoer. At the 2012 Summer Olympics he competed in the Men's slalom C-1 but did not advance to the semifinals after finishing 17th in the qualifying round.
