= Colin Radmore =

British slalom canoeist (born 1984)

Medal record

Men's canoe slalom

Representing Great Britain

World Championships
Bronze medal – third place	2009 La Seu d'Urgell	C2 team

European Championships
Silver medal – second place	2009 Nottingham	C2 team
Bronze medal – third place	2010 Bratislava	C2 team

Colin Radmore (born 1984) is a British slalom canoeist who competed at an international level from 2002 to 2010.

Radmore grew up in Chesterfield, Derbyshire. He attended Tupton Hall school. He specialized on the C1 class in the early part of his career, but switched to C2 in 2009, creating a partnership with Daniel Goddard.

He won a bronze medal in the C2 team event at the 2009 ICF Canoe Slalom World Championships in La Seu d'Urgell. He also won a silver and a bronze in the same event at the European Championships.

== World Cup individual podiums ==
Season	Date	Venue	Position	Event
2010	21 Feb 2010	Penrith	3rd	C2^{1}

^{1} Oceania Canoe Slalom Open counting for World Cup points
