= Richard Merjan =

Lebanese-Australian slalom canoeist (born 1988)

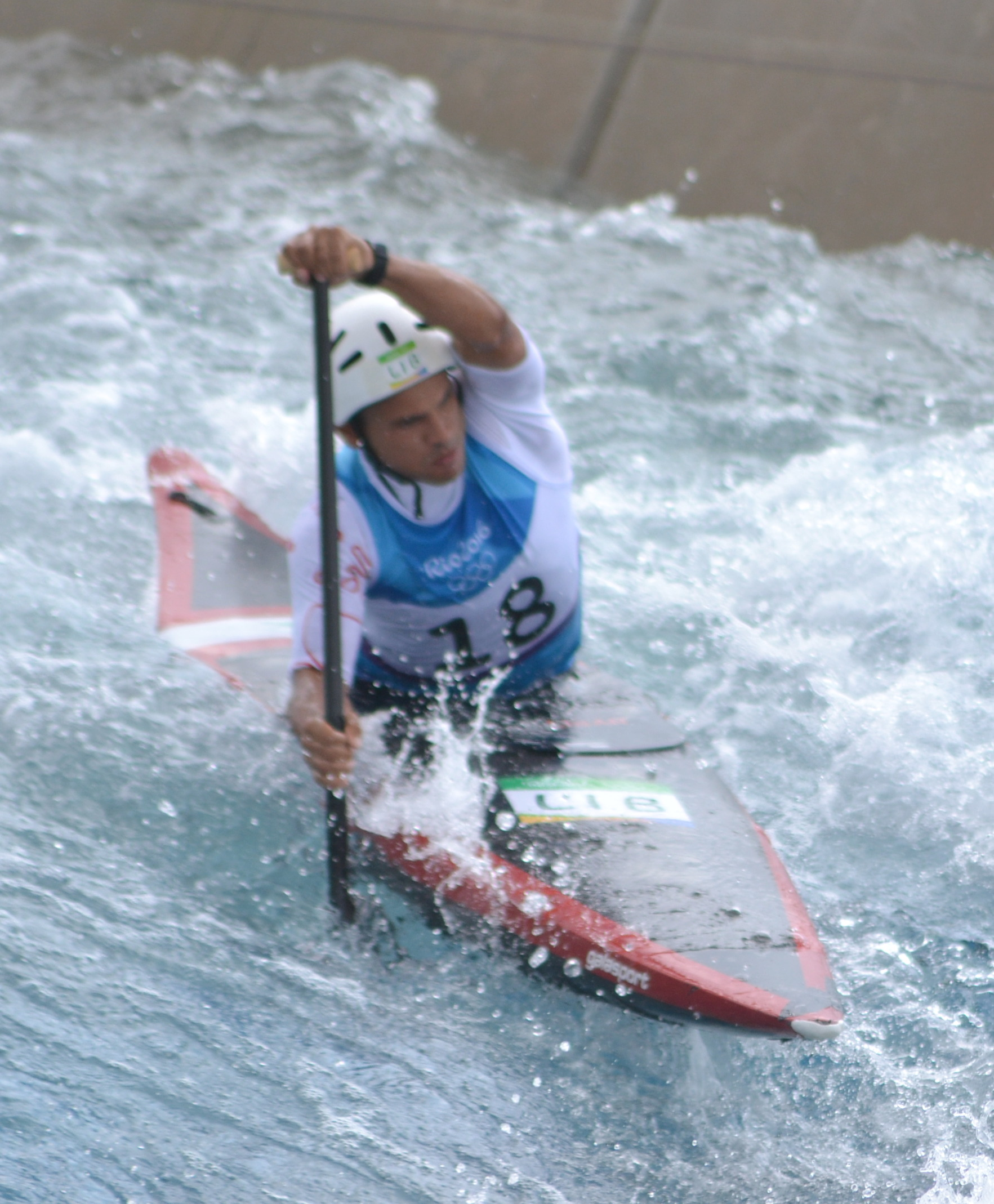
- Merjan at the 2016 Olympics

Personal information
- Nationality: Lebanese
- Born: 10 October 1988 (age 37)
- Height: 1.60 m (5 ft 3 in)
- Weight: 60 kg (132 lb)

Sport
- Country: Lebanon
- Sport: Canoeing
- Coached by: Zlatan Ibrahimbegovic; Nick Herodotou
Medal record
Men's canoe slalom
Representing Lebanon
Asian Championships
Silver medal – second place	2010 Xiasi	C1

Richard Merjan (born 10 November 1988) is a Lebanese-Australian slalom canoeist.

Merjan took up canoeing in 2001 at Ivanhoe Grammar School in Melbourne, Australia, and in 2003 started training with the Australian national team. He holds a dual Australian-Lebanese citizenship, and since 2009 competes for Lebanon. He missed qualifications for the 2012 Olympics due to a bad cut to his hand sustained in 2011. In 2016, he became the first Lebanese slalom canoeist to compete at Olympics. He finished last in the C-1 event.

Merjan has a degree in commerce, finance and language studies from the Deakin University in Victoria, Australia. He works as a flight analyst for an Australian airline.
