= Daniel Goddard (canoeist) =

British slalom canoeist (born 1983)

Medal record

Men's canoe slalom

Representing Great Britain

World Championships
Bronze medal – third place	2006 Prague	C1 team
Bronze medal – third place	2009 La Seu d'Urgell	C2 team

European Championships
Silver medal – second place	2009 Nottingham	C2 team
Bronze medal – third place	2010 Bratislava	C2 team

U23 European Championships
Bronze medal – third place	2005 Kraków	C1 team

Daniel Goddard (born 1983) is a British slalom canoeist who competed at the international level from 1998 to 2012.

He won a bronze medal in the C1 team event at the 2006 ICF Canoe Slalom World Championships in Prague and a bronze medal in the C2 team event at the 2009 ICF Canoe Slalom World Championships in La Seu d'Urgell. He also won a silver and a bronze in the C2 team event at the European Championships.

His C2 partner from 2007 to 2008 was Nick Smith and then from 2009 to 2010 it was Colin Radmore.

== World Cup individual podiums ==
Season	Date	Venue	Position	Event
2010	21 Feb 2010	Penrith	3rd	C2^{1}

^{1} Oceania Canoe Slalom Open counting for World Cup points
