= Xiasi, Kaili City =

Xiasi
- Town
- Location within Guizhou Location within China
- Coordinates: 26.51936°N 107.79976°E
- Country: China
- Province: Guizhou
- Autonomous prefecture: Qiandongnan
- County-level city: Kaili city

Xiasi (Chinese: 下司镇; pinyin: Xiàsī Zhèn) is a town of Kaili city, Guizhou province, China.The town was established in 1931, it has a total area of 154 square kilometres. The population was 35 thousand (2010 census), Miao and Mulao are native ethnic minorities. As a former administrative division of Majiang, Xiasi was changed to Kaili on September 25, 2014.

Located in the southwest of Kaili city, Xiasi is a commercial port situated in the upper reaches of the Qingshui river, the tributary of Wu river. Xiasi is famous for that it is the source place of Xiasi Dogs. There are many breeding sites for purebred Xiasi dog. It is also famous for the Canoe Slalom Training Base. The 2010 Asian Canoe Slalom Championships was held here in May 2010.

== See also ==
- List of township-level divisions of Guizhou
