= Shu Junrong =

Chinese canoe slalom racer

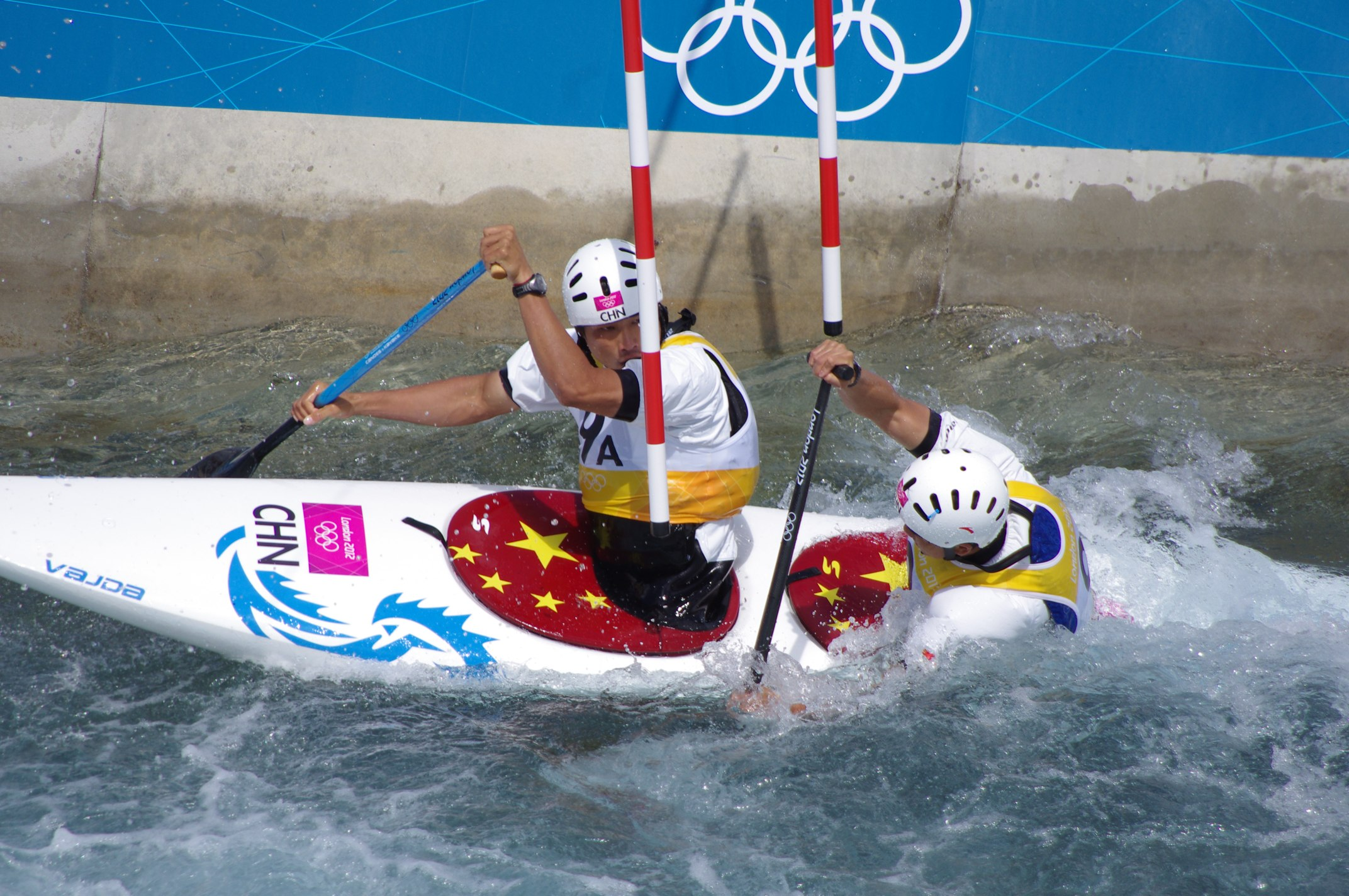
- Shu Junrong (rear/right) with Hu Minghai at the 2012 Summer Olympics

Personal information
- Native name: 舒俊榕
- Nationality: Chinese
- Born: 25 June 1988 (age 38) Mayang, Hunan
- Education: Beijing Sport University
- Height: 1.77 m (5 ft 10 in)
- Weight: 71 kg (157 lb)

Sport
- Country: China
- Sport: male Slalom Canoeist
- Club: Guangdong International Rowing Center
- Retired: yes
Medal record
Men's canoe slalom
Representing China
Asian Games
Gold medal – first place	2010 Guangzhou	C2
Asian Championships
Gold medal – first place	2010 Xiasi	C2
Gold medal – first place	2010 Xiasi	C2 team
Gold medal – first place	2017 Nakhon Nayok	C2
Gold medal – first place	2017 Nakhon Nayok	C2 team

Shu Junrong
- Traditional Chinese: 舒俊榕
- Simplified Chinese: 舒俊榕
Transcriptions
Standard Mandarin
- Hanyu Pinyin: Shū Jùn Róng

Shu Junrong (Chinese: 舒俊榕; pinyin: Shū Jùn Róng; born June 25, 1988, in Mayang, Hunan) is a former Chinese male slalom canoeist specializing in the C2 event with Hu Minghai. The pair competed together from 2003, when they were first paired until the 2013 National Games.

== Early life ==
Shu was born into a Slalom canoeing family in Shiyantan village (石眼潭村), Jiangkouya town (江口墟镇), Mayang, Hunan. His elder brother Shu Yong (舒用) was the gold medalist in K1 at two national games and the gold medalist at the 2000 Asian Championships. His elder female cousin Shu Zhenghua (舒正华) was also a canoeist. Shu loved playing in the river near his house, he had been a good swimmer while he was a small child.

At the age of 13, in 2001, Shu left Mayang with his brother. They moved to Guangzhou, entering in Guangdong International Rowing Center and following his brother into slalom canoeing. He was selected for the national training team in 2003. In the same year, Shu and Hu Minghai were originally paired for three months. They made a good team and were permanently paired from then on. Shu became a full member of the Chinese canoe slalom team in 2006.

== Career ==
Shu competed with Hu in two Olympic Games, finishing in 10th at 2008 Beijing Olympics and the 6th in 2012 London Olympics. The pair won gold medal at the 2010 ICF World Cup Race 1 in Prague. It was first time that Chinese canoeists won a C2 event at an ICF World Cup. From 2006 to 2012, the pair won four gold medals, one silver medal and two bronze medals in the ICF World Cup series, including ICF Asian Championships and Oceanian Championships. Between 2005 and 2013, Shu competed at the China National Games three times, winning gold medals in 2009 and 2013 and a silver medal in 2005.

== World Cup individual podiums ==
Season	Date	Venue	Position	Event
2006	27 Aug 2006	Zhangjiajie	1st	C2^{1}
2007	1 Jul 2007	Prague	3rd	C2
2008	16 Mar 2008	Penrith	1st	C2^{2}
2008	22 Jun 2008	Prague	2nd	C2
2010	2 May 2010	Xiasi	1st	C2^{1}
2010	19 Jun 2010	Prague	1st	C2
2012	17 Jun 2012	Pau	3rd	C2

^{1} Asia Canoe Slalom Championship counting for World Cup points
^{2} Oceania Championship counting for World Cup points

== Career highlights ==
- 2013 National Games, gold medal, men's C2
- 2012 Olympics, 6th, men's C2
- 2010 Asian Games, gold medal, men's C2
- 2010 Asian Championships, gold medal, men's C2
- 2009 National Games, gold medal, men's C2
- 2009 Canoe Slalom World Championships, 8th, men's C2 (details)
- 2008 Olympics, 10th, men's C2
- 2008 Canoe Slalom World Cup event Czech Republic, Prague, silver medal, men's C2 (details)
- 2008 Canoe Slalom World Cup event Australia Penrith, gold medal, men's C2 (details)
- 2007 Canoe Slalom World Cup Race 1 - Prague, Czech, bronze medal, men's C2 (details)
- 2005 National Games, silver medal, men's C2
- 2005 Holiday Cup National canoe slalom championships - Zijin Huang Tang slalom base, gold medal, men's C2 (details)
