= Canoeing at the 2010 Asian Games – Men's slalom C-2 =

Men's C-2 at the 2010 Asian Games
- Venue: Guangzhou International Rowing Centre
- Date: 15–16 November 2010
- Competitors: 14 from 6 nations

Medalists
gold medal	Hu Minghai; Shu Junrong	China
silver medal	Chen Fei; Shan Bao	China
bronze medal	Aleksey Zubarev; Aleksey Naumkin	Uzbekistan

The men's C-2 slalom canoeing competition at the 2010 Asian Games in Guangzhou was held on 15 and 16 November at the International Rowing Centre.

== Schedule ==
All times are China Standard Time (UTC+08:00)

Date	Time	Event
Monday, 15 November 2010	10:00	Heats 1st run
Monday, 15 November 2010	10:57	Heats 2nd run
Tuesday, 16 November 2010	10:00	Semifinal
Tuesday, 16 November 2010	10:57	Final

== Results ==
=== Heats ===
Rank	Team	1st run			2nd run			Best
Rank	Team	Time	Pen.	Total	Time	Pen.	Total	Best
1	China (CHN); Hu Minghai; Shu Junrong	95.71	4	99.71	96.56	0	96.56	96.56
2	China (CHN); Chen Fei; Shan Bao	104.41	2	106.41	101.13	2	103.13	103.13
3	Japan (JPN); Hiroyuki Nagao; Masatoshi Sanma	104.34	2	106.34	102.98	10	112.98	106.34
4	Uzbekistan (UZB); Aleksey Zubarev; Aleksey Naumkin	112.00	2	114.00	110.46	0	110.46	110.46
5	Iran (IRI); Bardia Mehrjoo; Amir Mohammad Fattahpour	111.17	2	113.17	125.08	54	179.08	113.17
6	Chinese Taipei (TPE); Kuo Meng-lung; Lin Hsiang-chun	106.26	102	208.26	117.43	102	219.43	208.26
7	Thailand (THA); Jakkrit Ongard; Damrongsak Chittong	133.46	202	335.46	139.70	108	247.70	247.70

=== Semifinal ===
Rank	Team	Time	Pen.	Total
1	China (CHN); Hu Minghai; Shu Junrong	105.10	2	107.10
2	Japan (JPN); Hiroyuki Nagao; Masatoshi Sanma	106.58	8	114.58
3	China (CHN); Chen Fei; Shan Bao	113.89	4	117.89
4	Iran (IRI); Bardia Mehrjoo; Amir Mohammad Fattahpour	122.23	4	126.23
5	Chinese Taipei (TPE); Kuo Meng-lung; Lin Hsiang-chun	136.34	56	192.34
6	Thailand (THA); Jakkrit Ongard; Damrongsak Chittong	154.47	204	358.47
7	Uzbekistan (UZB); Aleksey Zubarev; Aleksey Naumkin	109.10	356	465.10

=== Final ===
Rank	Team	Time	Pen.	Total
1st place, gold medalist(s)	China (CHN); Hu Minghai; Shu Junrong	99.96	0	99.96
2nd place, silver medalist(s)	China (CHN); Chen Fei; Shan Bao	109.58	4	113.58
3rd place, bronze medalist(s)	Uzbekistan (UZB); Aleksey Zubarev; Aleksey Naumkin	113.46	2	115.46
4	Chinese Taipei (TPE); Kuo Meng-lung; Lin Hsiang-chun	115.52	6	121.52
5	Japan (JPN); Hiroyuki Nagao; Masatoshi Sanma	128.64	4	132.64
6	Thailand (THA); Jakkrit Ongard; Damrongsak Chittong	135.89	16	151.89
7	Iran (IRI); Bardia Mehrjoo; Amir Mohammad Fattahpour	119.73	60	179.73
