= Hu Minghai =

Chinese slalom canoeist

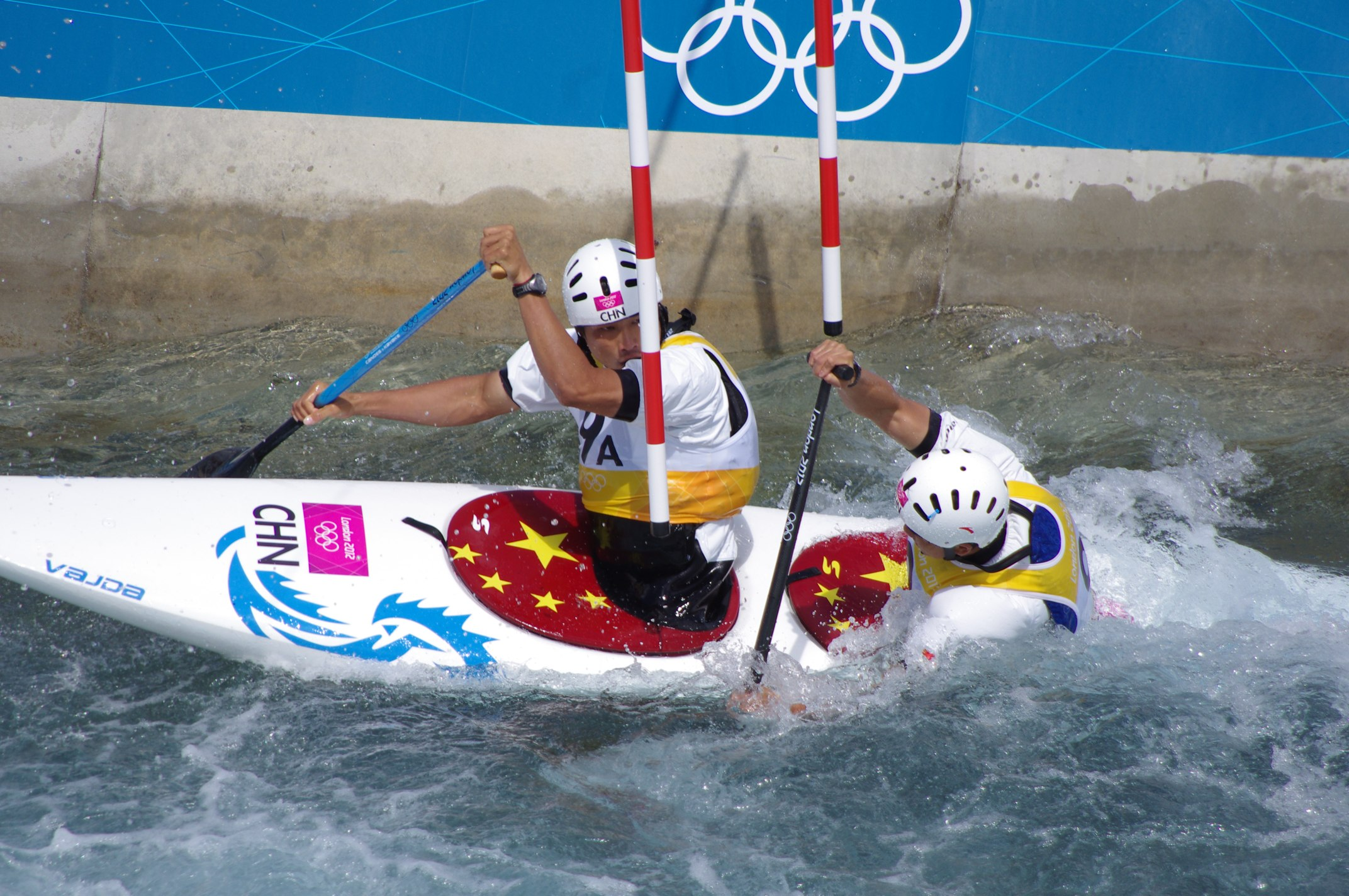
- Hu Minghai (front/left) with Shu Junrong at the 2012 Summer Olympics

Personal information
- Native name: 胡明海
- Nationality: Chinese
- Born: 19 April 1989 (age 37) Yueyang, Hunan
- Height: 1.76 m (5 ft 9 in)
- Weight: 70 kg (150 lb)

Sport
- Country: China
- Sport: male Slalom Canoeist
- Retired: yes
Medal record
Men's canoe slalom
Representing China
Asian Games
Gold medal – first place	2010 Guangzhou	C2
Asian Championships
Gold medal – first place	2010 Xiasi	C2
Gold medal – first place	2010 Xiasi	C2 team
Gold medal – first place	2017 Nakhon Nayok	C2
Gold medal – first place	2017 Nakhon Nayok	C2 team

Hu Minghai
- Traditional Chinese: 胡明海
- Simplified Chinese: 胡明海
Transcriptions
Standard Mandarin
- Hanyu Pinyin: Hú Míng Hǎi

Hu Minghai (Chinese: 胡明海; pinyin: Hú Míng Hǎi; born April 19, 1989, in Yueyang, Hunan) is a former Chinese male slalom canoeist specializing in the C2 event. He and his partner Shu Junrong competed together as a team from 2003 to the 2013 National Games.

== Early life ==
Hu was born in Wensheng residential community (文胜社区) of Rongjiawan (荣家湾), Yueyang county, Hunan. As a small child he used to go swimming and rowing in a fishing boat behind his parents' back in summer in a pond near his home. He had grown to be an excellent swimmer and rower at the age of eight or nine. He had strong arms and good coordination skills for rowing.

In 2001 it was Sui Hongjun (隋红军), who served as a whitewater slalom coach in Heyuan Water Sports Administration, Guangdong, who discovered Hu's potential in canoeing and recommended Hu to take part in slalom training. In March 2001, Hu went to Heyuan Slalom Team with Sui from Yueyang to start his slalom canoeing career.

Since Hu Minghai entered Heyuan Slalom Team in 2003, Hu and Shu Junrong being at similar age, started competing together in canoe doubles. Hu was picked for the national slalom training team in 2004 and in 2006, he became a full member of the Chinese canoe slalom team. The two-man team gradually became leading figures of Chinese slalom C2 events.

== Career ==
Hu competed in the Olympic Games twice with Shu, finishing the 10th in 2008 Beijing Olympics and the 6th in 2012 London Olympics. He won the gold medal at 2010 ICF World Cup Race 1 in Prague. It was first time that Chinese paddlers took a win in C2 in ICF World Cup. From 2006 to 2012, he won four gold medals, one silver medal and two bronze medals in the ICF World Cup series, including Asian Championships and Oceanian Championships. From 2005 to 2013, Hu competed in China National Games three times, winning gold in 2009 and 2013 and silver in 2005.

== World Cup individual podiums ==
Season	Date	Venue	Position	Event
2006	27 Aug 2006	Zhangjiajie	1st	C2^{1}
2007	1 Jul 2007	Prague	3rd	C2
2008	16 Mar 2008	Penrith	1st	C2^{2}
2008	22 Jun 2008	Prague	2nd	C2
2010	2 May 2010	Xiasi	1st	C2^{1}
2010	19 Jun 2010	Prague	1st	C2
2012	17 Jun 2012	Pau	3rd	C2

^{1} Asia Canoe Slalom Championship counting for World Cup points
^{2} Oceania Championship counting for World Cup points

== Career highlights ==
- 2013 National Games, gold medal, men's C2
- 2012 Olympics, 6th, men's C2
- 2010 Asian Games, gold medal, men's C2
- 2010 Asian Championships, gold medal, men's C2
- 2009 National Games, gold medal, men's C2
- 2009 Canoe slalom world championships, 8th, men's C2 (details)
- 2008 Olympics, 10th, men's C2
- 2008 Canoe Slalom World Cup event Czech Prague, silver medal, men's C2 (details)
- 2008 Canoe Slalom World Cup event Australia Penrith, gold medal, men's C2 (details)
- 2007 Canoe Slalom World Cup Race 1 – Prague, Czech, bronze medal, men's C2 (details)
- 2005 National Games, silver medal, men's C2
- 2005 Holiday Cup National canoe slalom championships – Zijin Huang Tang slalom base, gold medal, men's C2 (details)
