= Daniel Watkins (canoeist) =

Australian slalom canoeist (born 1995)

Personal information
- Nationality: Australian
- Born: 21 November 1995 (age 30)

Sport
- Country: Australia
- Sport: Canoe slalom
- Rank: No. 26 (K1); No. 36 (C1)
- Event: K1, C1
- Club: Derwent Canoe Club
- Coached by: Robin Jeffery, Julien Billaut
Medal record
Men's canoe slalom
Representing Australia
Junior World Championships
Silver medal – second place	2012 Wausau	K1 team

Daniel Watkins (born 21 November 1995) is an Australian slalom canoeist who has competed at the international level since 2011. He is from Grove, Tasmania.

Daniel represented Australia in the C1 event at the 2020 Summer Olympics in Tokyo, after securing a quota place by winning the 2020 Oceania Canoe Slalom Championships. He qualified 2nd fastest for the final, finishing in 9th place.

== Early years ==
Watkins grew up in Grove, Tasmania. He had plenty of time for recreation in this peaceful setting and started paddling in 2007 when he was 11 years of age. His technique was good and his parents decided that he should learn to canoe and paddle correctly.

Watkins was enrolled in the Derwent Canoe Club beginners program. He competed in both the C1 and K1 classes. Watkins has remained with the club ever since.

Watkins made his Junior National debut in 2011 at the Pre-World Championships, before contesting the U23 classes from 2014.

== Achievements ==
Daniel is one of only a few male athletes to compete in both the C1 and K1 events internationally. He is coached by 2012 C2 Olympian Robin Jeffery and 2006 K1 world champion Julien Billaut.

Watkins won a silver medal in the K1 team event at the 2012 Junior World Championships in Wausau. He achieved his best senior world championship results at the 2018 ICF Canoe Slalom World Championships in Rio de Janeiro, with 22nd and 28th in the C1 & K1 events respectively.
