= Chen Shi =

Chen Shi may refer to:

- Chen Shi (Han dynasty) (陳寔; 104–187), style name Zhonggong (仲弓), Eastern Han dynasty official
- Chen Shi (Three Kingdoms) (陳式), a Shu general of the Three Kingdoms period
- Chen Shi (canoeist) (born 1993), Chinese slalom canoeist
