= Canoeing at the 2018 Asian Games – Women's slalom C-1 =

Women's C-1 at the 2018 Asian Games
- Venue: Bendung Rentang
- Date: 21–23 August 2018
- Competitors: 11 from 8 nations

Medalists
gold medal	Chen Shi	China
silver medal	Chen Wei-han	Chinese Taipei
bronze medal	Atcharaporn Duanglawa	Thailand

The women's slalom C-1 (canoe single) competition at the 2018 Asian Games was held from 21 to 23 August 2018. Each NOC could enter two athletes but only one of them could advance to the final.

== Schedule ==
All times are Western Indonesia Time (UTC+07:00)

Date	Time	Event
Tuesday, 21 August 2018	13:00	Heats
Thursday, 23 August 2018	09:30	Semifinal
Thursday, 23 August 2018	11:20	Final

== Results ==
Legend

- DNF — Did not finish
- DNS — Did not start

=== Heats ===
Rank	Athlete	1st run			2nd run			Best
Rank	Athlete	Time	Pen.	Total	Time	Pen.	Total	Best
1	Yang Jie (CHN)	98.30	0	98.30			DNS	98.30
2	Chen Shi (CHN)	102.66	0	102.66	99.87	2	101.87	101.87
3	Ren Mishima (JPN)	108.59	2	110.59	111.64	2	113.64	110.59
4	Kamilla Safina (KAZ)	114.56	4	118.56	118.40	2	120.40	118.56
5	Atcharaporn Duanglawa (THA)	115.31	4	119.31			DNS	119.31
6	Chen Wei-han (TPE)	115.74	4	119.74	130.95	52	182.95	119.74
7	Reski Wahyuni (INA)	146.34	54	200.34	134.05	4	138.05	138.05
8	Worada Chonsuk (THA)	131.22	10	141.22		102	DNF	141.22
9	Champa Mourya (IND)	165.22	6	171.22	308.49	14	322.49	171.22
10	Shaghayegh Seyed-Yousefi (IRI)	159.38	112	271.38	173.37	6	179.37	179.37
11	Maryati (INA)	156.93	60	216.93	148.55	106	254.55	216.93

=== Semifinal ===
Rank	Athlete	Time	Pen.	Total
1	Chen Shi (CHN)	105.90	0	105.90
2	Yang Jie (CHN)	106.70	4	110.70
3	Ren Mishima (JPN)	122.62	0	122.62
4	Atcharaporn Duanglawa (THA)	120.71	4	124.71
5	Chen Wei-han (TPE)	121.11	4	125.11
6	Kamilla Safina (KAZ)	126.65	2	128.65
7	Champa Mourya (IND)	170.14	6	176.14
8	Shaghayegh Seyed-Yousefi (IRI)	165.14	112	277.14
9	Reski Wahyuni (INA)	216.24	100	316.24
10	Worada Chonsuk (THA)	281.83	58	339.83

=== Final ===
Rank	Athlete	Time	Pen.	Total
1st place, gold medalist(s)	Chen Shi (CHN)	106.32	4	110.32
2nd place, silver medalist(s)	Chen Wei-han (TPE)	109.14	2	111.14
3rd place, bronze medalist(s)	Atcharaporn Duanglawa (THA)	116.34	0	116.34
4	Ren Mishima (JPN)	112.96	4	116.96
5	Kamilla Safina (KAZ)	130.88	2	132.88
6	Reski Wahyuni (INA)	137.69	4	141.69
7	Champa Mourya (IND)	153.63	8	161.63
8	Shaghayegh Seyed-Yousefi (IRI)	169.35	6	175.35
