= Pietro Camporesi =

Italian slalom canoer

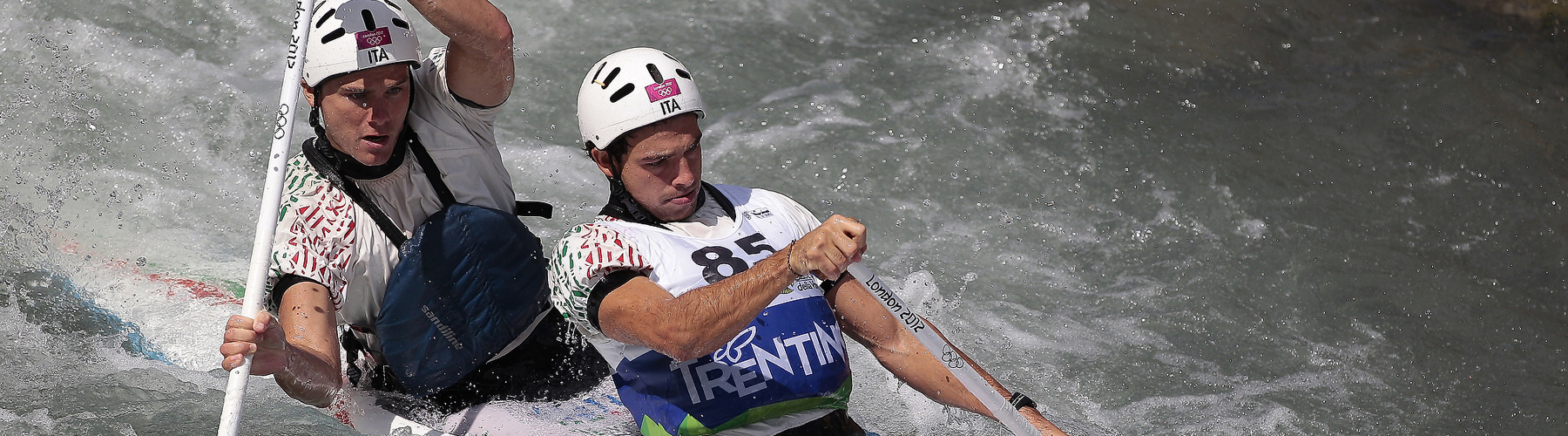
- C2 Camporesi/Ferrari in action at the 2013 Italian Championships in Mezzana

Personal information
- Born: 25 October 1987 (age 38) Bologna, Italy

Sport
- Country: Italy
- Sport: Canoe slalom

Pietro Camporesi (born 25 October 1987, in Bologna) is an Italian slalom canoer. At the 2012 Summer Olympics he competed in the C-2 event together with Niccolò Ferrari. They did not advance to the semifinals after finishing 13th in the qualifying round.

== 2002 ==
Placing	Category	Competition Level	Location	River
55	K1 SENIOR	International Canoe Slalom	(Slovenia) Solkan	Soca
51	K1 SENIOR	International Canoe Slalom	(Slovenia) Kobarid	Soca
71	K1 SENIOR	International Canoe Slalom	(Italy) Merano	Passer
81	K1 SENIOR	International Canoe Slalom	(Italy) Merano	Passer

== 2003 ==
Placing	Category	Competition Level	Location	River
81	K1 SENIOR	International Canoe Slalom	(Italy) Merano	Passer
54	K1 SENIOR	International Canoe Slalom	(Slovenia) Kobarid	Soca
23	K1 TEAM	European Junior and U23 Canoe Slalom Championships	(Germany) Hohenlimburg	Lenne

== 2004 ==
Placing	Category	Competition Level	Location	River
40	K1	Canoe Slalom Junior World Championship	(Austria) Lofer	Saalach
12	K1 TEAM	Canoe Slalom Junior World Championship	(Austria) Lofer	Saalach
22	K1	European Junior and U23 Canoe Slalom Championships	(Poland) Kraków	Kraków-Kolna Canoe Slalom Course
15	K1 TEAM	European Junior and U23 Canoe Slalom Championships	(Poland) Kraków	Kraków-Kolna Canoe Slalom Course

== 2005 ==
Result	Category	Competition Level	Location	River
18	K1	European Junior and U23 Canoe Slalom Championships	(Poland) Kraków	Kraków-Kolna Canoe Slalom Course
4	K1 TEAM	European Junior and U23 Canoe Slalom Championships	(Poland) Kraków	Kraków-Kolna Canoe Slalom Course

== 2007 and later ==
Camporesi began to compete with Niccolò Ferrari in C2 canoeing.

Year	Position	Category	Event	Place	River
2007	2°	C2	International C	(Italy) Merano	Passer
2007	10°	C2	European Junior U23 Championships	(Poland) Kraków	Kraków-Kolna Canoe Slalom Course
2008	21°	C2	2^ World Cup	(Slovenia) Tacen	Tacen Whitewater Course
2008	21°	C2	3^ World Cup	(Germany) Augsburg	Augsburg Eiskanal
2008	5°	C2	European Junior U23 Championships	(Slovenia) Solkan	Soca
2009	2°	C2	International C	(Slovenia) Tacen	Tacen Whitewater Course
2009	13°	C2	International C	(Slovakia) Liptovský Mikuláš	Ondrej Cibak Whitewater Slalom Course
2009	24°	C2	2^ World Cup	(Slovakia) Bratislava	Cunovo Water Sports Centre
2009	18°	C2	3^ World Cup	(Germany) Augsburg	Augsburg Eiskanal
2009	8°	C2	European Junior U23 Championships	(Slovakia) Liptovský Mikuláš	Ondrej Cibak Whitewater Slalom Course
2009	8°	C2	International C	(Slovakia) Bratislava	Cunovo Water Sports Centre
2009	40°	C2	ICF Canoe Slalom World Championships	(Spain) La Seu d'Urgell	Segre Olympic Park
2009	17°	C2	International	(Slovenia) Tacen	Tacen Whitewater Course
2010	17°	C2	1^ World Cup	(Czech Republic) Prague	Prague-Troja Canoeing Centre
2010	24°	C2	European Championships	(Slovakia) Bratislava	Cunovo Water Sports Centre
2010	12°	C2	World Championships	(Slovenia) Tacen	Tacen Whitewater Course
2010	18°	C2	European Junior U23 Championships	(Germany) Markkleeberg	Kanupark Markkleeberg
2011	5°	C2	European Championships	(Spain) La Seu d'Urgell	Segre Olympic Park
2011	9°	C2	III^ World Cup	(Germany) Markkleeberg	Kanupark Markkleeberg
2012	9°	C2	European Championships	(Germany) Augsburg	Augsburg Eiskanal
2012	17°	C2	I^ World Cup,	(United Kingdom) Cardiff	Cardiff International White Water
2012	15°	C2	II^ World Cup,	(France) Pau	Pau-Pyrénées Whitewater Stadium
2012	8°	C2	III^ World Cup	(Spain) La Seu d'Urgell	Segre Olympic Park
2012	13°	C2	XXX Summer Olympics	(United Kingdom) London	Lee Valley White Water Centre
2013	20°	C2	World Championships	(Czech Republic) Prague	Prague-Troja Canoeing Centre
2013	16°	C2	1^ World Cup	(Germany) Augsburg	Augsburg Eiskanal
2013	14°	C2	2^ World Cup	(Spain) La Seu d'Urgell	Segre Olympic Park
2013	4°	C2	4^ World Cup	(Slovenia) Tacen	Tacen Whitewater Course
2013	11°	C2	5^ World Cup	(Slovakia) Bratislava	Cunovo Water Sports Centre
2014	Heats	C2	World Championships	(United States) McHenry, Maryland	Adventure Sports Center International
2014	15°	C2	1^ World Cup	(United Kingdom) London	Lee Valley White Water Centre
2014	10°	C2	2^ World Cup	(Slovenia) Tacen	Tacen Whitewater Course
2014	10°	C2	3^ World Cup	(Czech Republic) Prague	Prague-Troja Canoeing Centre
2015	Semifinal	C2	World Championships	(United Kingdom) London	Lee Valley White Water Centre
2015	28°	C2	1^ World Cup	(Czech Republic) Prague	Prague-Troja Canoeing Centre
2015	6°	C2	2^ World Cup	(Poland) Kraków	Kraków-Kolna Canoe Slalom Course
2015	10°	C2	3^ World Cup	(Slovakia) Liptovský Mikuláš	Ondrej Cibak Whitewater Slalom Course
2015	22°	C2	4^ World Cup	(France) Pau	Pau-Pyrénées Whitewater Stadium
