= Canoeing at the 2008 Summer Olympics – Men's slalom C-2 =

The men's C-2 slalom competition in canoeing at the 2008 Summer Olympics took place between August 13 and 15, 2008 at the Shunyi Olympic Rowing-Canoeing Park in Beijing. The C-2 (canoe single) event is raced by two-man canoes through a whitewater course. The finals were rescheduled from the 14th to the 15th due to persistent lightning at the Park.

There were three rounds of competitions: the heats, the semifinal, and the final. In the heats, each canoeist completed two runs of the course. The time, in seconds, of each run was added to the number of penalty points assessed. Touching any of the 21 slalom gates resulted in a 2-second penalty for each gate touched, while skipping any of the gates resulted in a 50-second penalty. The total times for the two preliminary runs were summed to give a score for the heats. The top 12 boats advanced to the semifinals.

The semifinals consisted of a single run. The field was narrowed to the top 8 scores from that run; those 8 boats advanced to the final. The times from the final were added to the semifinal score to give an overall total.

== Medalists ==
Gold	Silver	Bronze
Pavol Hochschorner and Peter Hochschorner (SVK)	Ondřej Štěpánek and Jaroslav Volf (CZE)	Mikhail Kuznetsov and Dmitry Larionov (RUS)

=== Schedule ===
All times are China Standard Time (UTC+8)

Date	Time	Round
Wednesday, August 13, 2008	15:00-15:40	Heats 1st Run
Wednesday, August 13, 2008	16:42-17:22	Heats 2nd Run
Thursday, August 14, 2008	15:00-15:35	Semifinal
Friday, August 15, 2008	16:47-17:12	Final

=== Results ===
Rank	Name	Country	Preliminary Round				Semifinal		Final	
Rank	Name	Country	Run 1	Run 2	Total	Rank	Time	Rank	Time	Total
1st place, gold medalist(s)	Pavol Hochschorner & Peter Hochschorner	Slovakia	93.69	93.04	186.73	1	94.88	2	95.94	190.82
2nd place, silver medalist(s)	Jaroslav Volf & Ondřej Štěpánek	Czech Republic	93.78	97.16	190.94	4	95.33	3	97.56	192.89
3rd place, bronze medalist(s)	Mikhail Kuznetsov & Dmitry Larionov	Russia	98.43	97.65	196.08	6	98.57	4	98.80	197.37
4	Cédric Forgit & Martin Braud	France	96.17	92.39	188.56	2	102.76	5	95.43	198.19
5	Andrea Benetti & Erik Masoero	Italy	100.08	102.20	202.28	8	103.64	6	100.48	204.12
6	Felix Michel & Sebastian Piersig	Germany	96.04	96.33	192.37	5	94.38	1	110.05	204.43
7	Mark Bellofiore & Lachie Milne	Australia	104.61	98.21	202.82	9	104.17	7		
8	Paweł Sarna & Marcin Pochwała	Poland	98.38	100.37	198.75	7	105.32	8		
9	Masatoshi Sanma & Hiroyuki Nagao	Japan	99.47	113.09	212.56	10	110.10	9		
10	Hu Minghai & Shu Junrong	China	97.30	93.34	190.64	3	164.08	10		
11	Rick Powell & Casey Eichfeld	United States	101.69	151.65	253.34	11				
12	Cyprian Ngidi & Cameron McIntosh	South Africa	119.83	157.37	277.20	12				
