= Mikhail Kuznetsov (canoeist) =

Russian canoeist

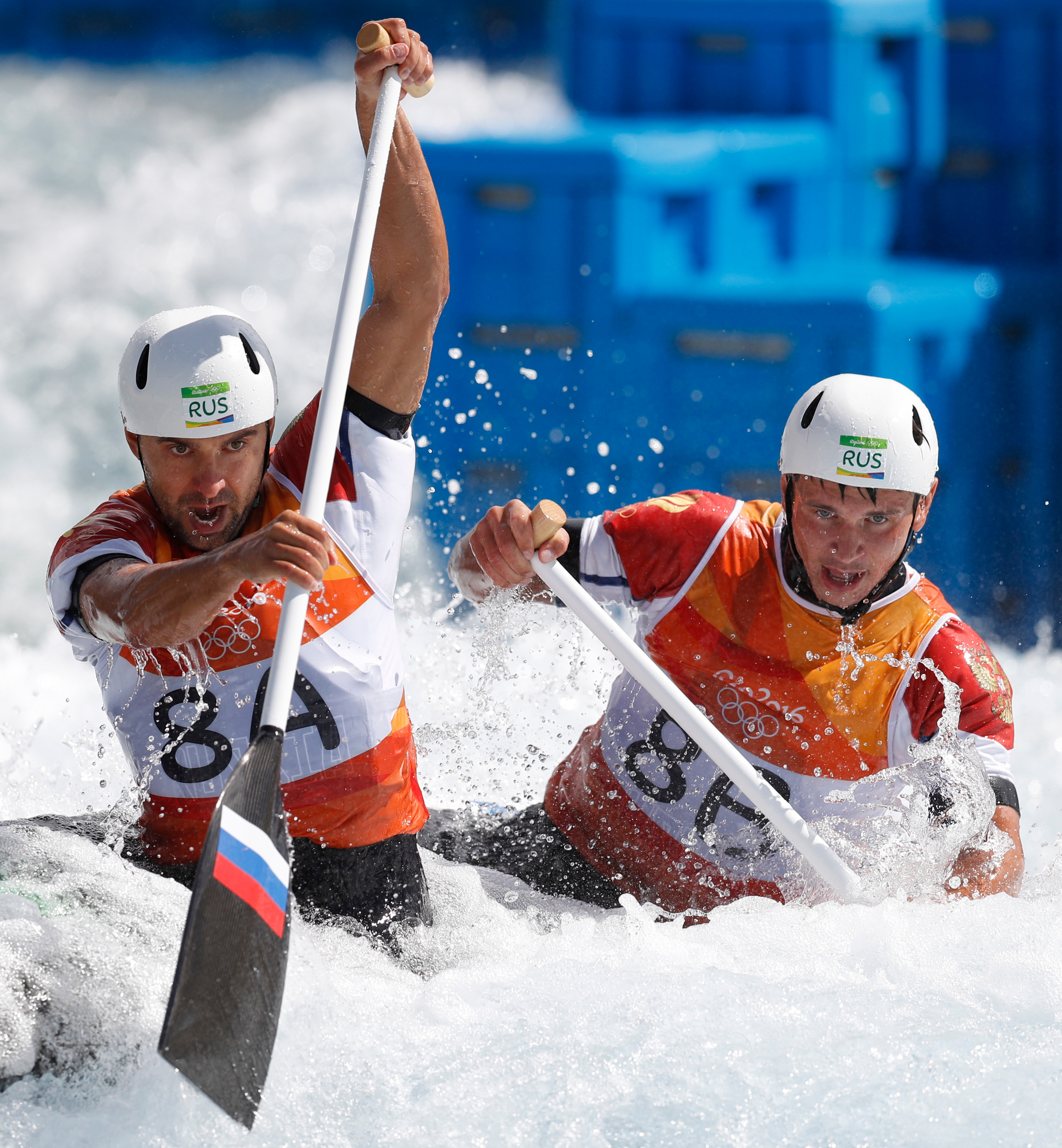
- Kuznetsov (left) and Larionov at the 2016 Olympics

Personal information
- Born: 14 May 1985 (age 41) Nizhny Tagil, Russian SFSR, Soviet Union
- Height: 171 cm (5 ft 7 in)
- Weight: 72 kg (159 lb)

Sport
- Sport: Canoe slalom
Medal record
Representing Russia
Olympic Games
Bronze medal – third place	2008 Beijing	C-2
European Championships
Bronze medal – third place	2015 Markkleeberg	C-2 team

Mikhail Nikolayevich Kuznetsov (Russian: Михаил Николаевич Кузнецов; born 14 May 1985) is a Russian slalom canoeist who has competed since the early 2000s in the C2 class together with his partner Dmitry Larionov.

He won a bronze medal in the C2 event at the 2008 Summer Olympics in Beijing. He also finished 14th in 2012 and 6th in 2016 in the same event.

He won a bronze medal in the C2 team event at the 2015 European Championships.
