= Niccolò Ferrari =

Italian canoeist (born 1987)

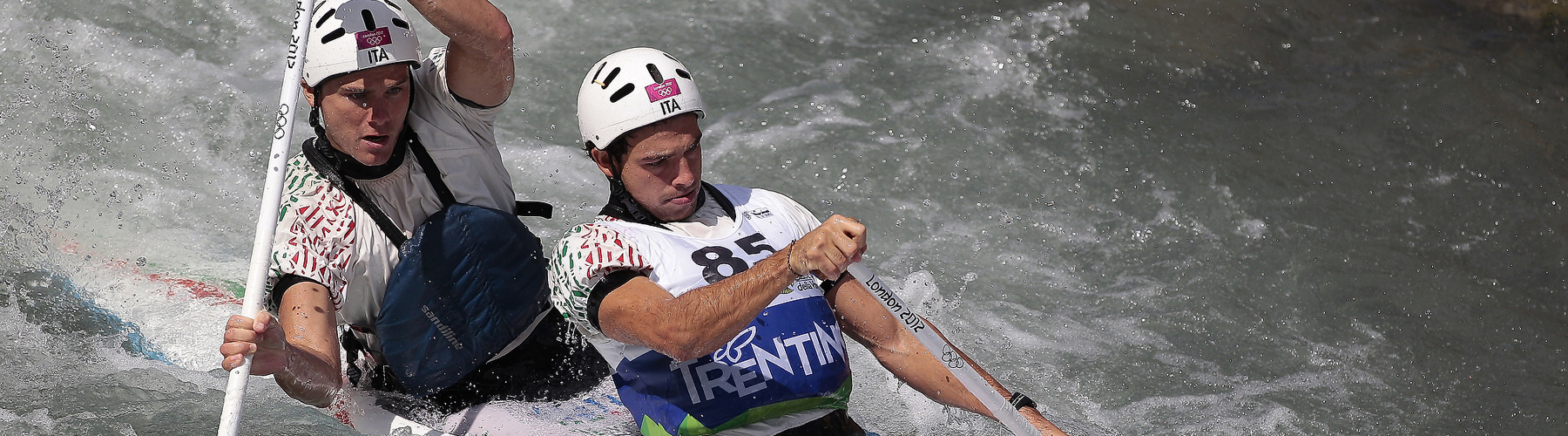
- C2 Camporesi/Ferrari in action at the 2013 Italian Championships in Mezzana

Medal record

Men's canoe slalom

Representing Italy

World Championships
Silver medal – second place	2017 Pau	Mixed C2

Niccolò Ferrari (born 24 August 1987, in Padua) is an Italian slalom canoeist who has competed at the international level since 2007.

Ferrari won a silver medal in the Mixed C2 event at the 2017 ICF Canoe Slalom World Championships in Pau together with Stefanie Horn. At the 2012 Summer Olympics he competed in the C2 event together with Pietro Camporesi. They did not advance to the semifinals after finishing 13th in the qualifying round.

== Results ==
Year	Position	Category	Event	Place	Course/River
2007	2	C2	International	(Italy) Merano	Passer
2007	10	C2	European Junior U23 Championships	(Poland) Kraków	Kraków-Kolna Canoe Slalom Course
2008	21	C2	World Cup 2	(Slovenia) Tacen	Tacen Whitewater Course
2008	21	C2	World Cup 3	(Germany) Augsburg	Augsburg Eiskanal
2008	5	C2	European Junior U23 Championships	(Slovenia) Solkan	Soča
2009	2	C2	International	(Slovenia) Tacen	Tacen Whitewater Course
2009	13	C2	International	(Slovakia) Liptovský Mikuláš	Ondrej Cibak Whitewater Slalom Course
2009	24	C2	World Cup 2	(Slovakia) Bratislava	Cunovo Water Sports Centre
2009	18	C2	World Cup 3	(Germany) Augsburg	Augsburg Eiskanal
2009	8	C2	European Junior U23 Championships	(Slovakia) Liptovský Mikuláš	Ondrej Cibak Whitewater Slalom Course
2009	8	C2	International	(Slovakia) Bratislava	Cunovo Water Sports Centre
2009	40	C2	ICF Canoe Slalom World Championships	(Spain) La Seu d'Urgell	Segre Olympic Park
2009	17	C2	International	(Slovenia) Tacen	Tacen Whitewater Course
2010	17	C2	World Cup 1	(Czech Republic) Prague	Prague-Troja Canoeing Centre
2010	24	C2	European Championships	(Slovakia) Bratislava	Cunovo Water Sports Centre
2010	12	C2	World Championships	(Slovenia) Tacen	Tacen Whitewater Course
2010	18	C2	European Junior U23 Championships	(Germany) Markkleeberg	Kanupark Markkleeberg
2011	5	C2	European Championships	(Spain) La Seu d'Urgell	Segre Olympic Park
2011	9	C2	World Cup 3	(Germany) Markkleeberg	Kanupark Markkleeberg
2012	9	C2	European Championships	(Germany) Augsburg	Augsburg Eiskanal
2012	17	C2	World Cup 1	(United Kingdom) Cardiff	Cardiff International White Water
2012	15	C2	World Cup 2	(France) Pau	Pau-Pyrénées Whitewater Stadium
2012	8	C2	World Cup 3	(Spain) La Seu d'Urgell	Segre Olympic Park
2012	13	C2	XXX Summer Olympics	(United Kingdom) London	Lee Valley White Water Centre
2013	20	C2	World Championships	(Czech Republic) Prague	Prague-Troja Canoeing Centre
2013	16	C2	World Cup 1	(Germany) Augsburg	Augsburg Eiskanal
2013	14	C2	World Cup 2	(Spain) La Seu d'Urgell	Segre Olympic Park
2013	4	C2	World Cup 4	(Slovenia) Tacen	Tacen Whitewater Course
2013	11	C2	World Cup 5	(Slovakia) Bratislava	Cunovo Water Sports Centre
2014	Heats	C2	World Championships	(United States) McHenry, Maryland	Adventure Sports Center International
2014	15	C2	World Cup 1	(United Kingdom) London	Lee Valley White Water Centre
2014	10	C2	World Cup 2	(Slovenia) Tacen	Tacen Whitewater Course
2014	10	C2	World Cup 3	(Czech Republic) Prague	Prague-Troja Canoeing Centre
2015	Semifinal	C2	World Championships	(United Kingdom) London	Lee Valley White Water Centre
2015	28	C2	World Cup 1	(Czech Republic) Prague	Prague-Troja Canoeing Centre
2015	6	C2	World Cup 2	(Poland) Kraków	Kraków-Kolna Canoe Slalom Course
2015	10	C2	World Cup 3	(Slovakia) Liptovský Mikuláš	Ondrej Cibak Whitewater Slalom Course
2015	22	C2	World Cup 4	(France) Pau	Pau-Pyrénées Whitewater Stadium
