= 2020 Oceania Canoe Slalom Championships =

The 2020 Oceania Canoe Slalom Championships took place in Auckland, New Zealand from 1 to 3 February 2020 under the auspices of International Canoe Federation (ICF). The event was hosted at Vector Wero Whitewater Park for the 3rd time.

There were 128 entries from 11 nations.

== Olympic Qualification ==
This event also served as the Oceanian qualification for the postponed 2020 Summer Olympics in Tokyo. The only available quota was for the men's C1 event, after Australia and New Zealand earned quotas for the other Olympic disciplines at the 2019 World Championships in La Seu d'Urgell.

Daniel Watkins secured the final quota for Australia by winning the C1 event.

== Medal summary ==
=== Men ===
Event	Gold		Silver		Bronze	
C1	Daniel Watkins; Australia	101.57	Zachary Lokken; United States	103.34	Ian Borrows; Australia	106.12
K1	Lucien Delfour; Australia	85.76	Michal Smolen; United States	91.33	Finn Butcher; New Zealand	92.07

=== Women ===
Event	Gold		Silver		Bronze	
C1	Jessica Fox; Australia	107.52	Monica Doria Vilarrubla; Andorra	112.60	Luuka Jones; New Zealand	114.23
K1	Jessica Fox; Australia	102.14	Luuka Jones; New Zealand	102.63	Camille Prigent; France	106.88

== Medals Table ==
* Host nation (New Zealand)

Rank	Nation	Gold	Silver	Bronze	Total
1	Australia (AUS)	4	0	1	5
2	United States (USA)	0	2	0	2
3	New Zealand (NZL)*	0	1	2	3
4	Andorra (AND)	0	1	0	1
5	France (FRA)	0	0	1	1
Totals (5 entries)		4	4	4	12
