= 2017 Asian Canoe Slalom Championships =

Canoeing competition in Nakhon Nayok, Thailand

- Host city: Nakhon Nayok, Thailand
- Dates: 24–26 February 2017
- Main venue: Khun Dan Prakan Chon Dam

The 2017 Asian Canoe Slalom Championships were the 10th Asian Canoe Slalom Championships and took place from February 24–26, 2017 at the Khun Dan Prakan Chon Dam, Nakhon Nayok, Thailand.

== Medal summary ==
=== Individual ===
Event	Gold	Silver	Bronze
Men's C-1	Zhang Genyuan; China	Zheng Jiaxin; China	Kuanysh Yerengaipov; Kazakhstan
Men's C-2	China; Hu Minghai; Shu Junrong	China; Yu Hongmin; Chen Jin	Uzbekistan; Sirojiddin Kuchkorov; Abubakir Bukanov
Men's K-1	Djanibek Temirgaliev; Uzbekistan	Hermann Husslein; Thailand	Zhao Zhengchao; China
Women's C-1	Chen Shi; China	Lü Minzhen; China	Yu Cuishan; China
Women's K-1	Ren Ye; China	Li Tong; China	Xu Yanru; China
Women's C-2	Thailand; Ravisara Sangsuwan; Thatchaporn Pornchai	Thailand; Charuwan Naeemthong; Worada Chonsuk	Indonesia; Sumita Kurnia; Maryati
Mixed C-2	Uzbekistan; Sirojiddin Kuchkorov; Aleksandra Fomenkova	Uzbekistan; Alibek Temirgaliev; Irina Chuprigina	Kazakhstan; Kuanysh Yerengaipov; Elvira Galkina

=== Team ===
Event	Gold	Silver	Bronze
Men's C-1	China; Wang Sheng; Zhang Genyuan; Zheng Jiaxin	Chinese Taipei; Chang Yun-chuan; Chiu Huai-chun; Liu Chin-han	Iran; Amir Mohammad Fattahpour; Homayoun Mohammadpour; Mehdi Karimi
Men's C-2	China; Hu Minghai; Shu Junrong; Yu Hongmin; Chen Jin; Zheng Jiaxin; Zhang Genyuan	Uzbekistan; Sirojiddin Kuchkorov; Abubakir Bukanov; Djanibek Temirgaliev; Alibek Temirgaliev; Ismoilbek Abdumanapov; Azizali Sagindikov	Thailand; Hermann Husslein; Chatuphon Thimthong; Yutthakan Chaidet; Rattanajet Chooampai; Siripong Chuemchun; Korawit Sukjaeng
Men's K-1	Chinese Taipei; Wu Shao-hsuan; Lee Han-cheng; Hu Wen-yi	Kazakhstan; Pavel Zinovyev; Valeriy Shirokov; Pyotr Volkov	Thailand; Hermann Husslein; Korawit Sukjaeng; Paitas Ngamsaga
Women's C-1	China; Chen Shi; Yu Cuishan; Lü Minzhen	Chinese Taipei; Chen Wei-han; Chung Yu-han; Rao Chih-shuan	Thailand; Atcharaporn Duanglawa; Sirijit Onnom; Thatchaporn Pornchai
Women's K-1	China; Ren Ye; Xu Yanru; Li Tong	Chinese Taipei; Chang Chu-han; Liu Jen-yu; Chung Yu-han	Indonesia; Sumita Kurnia; Maryati; Ayu Azari

== Medal table ==
Rank	Nation	Gold	Silver	Bronze	Total
1	China	8	4	3	15
2	Uzbekistan	2	2	1	5
3	Chinese Taipei	1	3	0	4
4	Thailand	1	2	3	6
5	Kazakhstan	0	1	2	3
6	Indonesia	0	0	2	2
7	Iran	0	0	1	1
Totals (7 entries)		12	12	12	36
