= Kynan Maley =

Australian canoeist

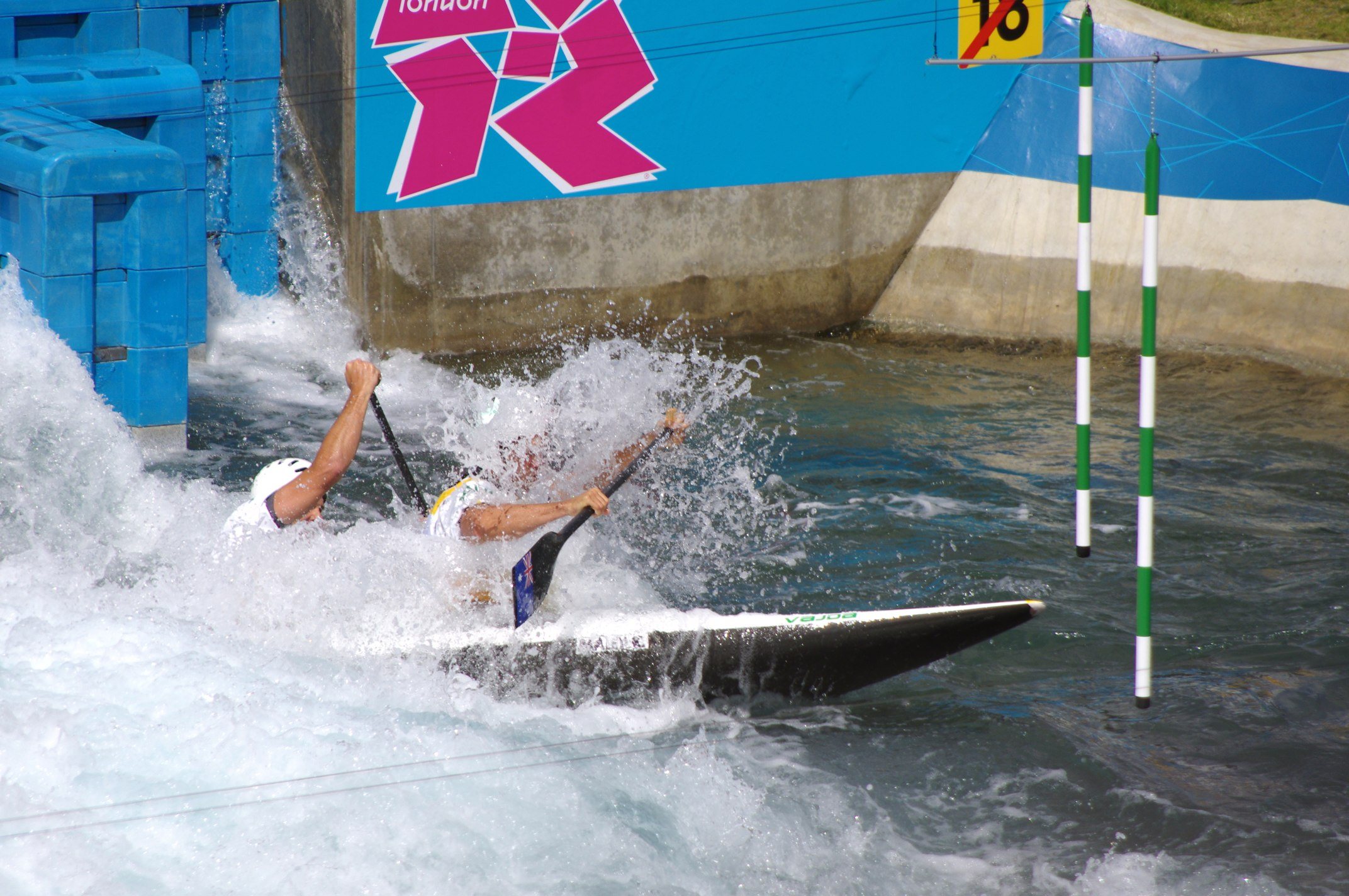
Kynan Maley (right) and Robin Jeffery at the 2012 Summer Olympics

Kynan Maley (born 13 October 1981 in Fremantle) is an Australian slalom canoeist. At the 2012 Summer Olympics he competed in the C-1 event as well as the C-2 event. In C-1 Maley reached the final where he finished in 6th place. He placed in 10th place in C-2 with Robin Jeffery after being eliminated in the semifinal.

Originally from Fremantle, Western Australia, but now based at Penrith, New South Wales, Maley has attempted to compete at the Olympics since 2000. However, Australia's only C-1 slalom canoe position was taken at each games by Robin Bell, who won the bronze medal at the Beijing Olympics.
