= Canoeing at the 2020 Summer Olympics – Qualification =

This article details the canoeing at the 2020 Summer Olympics qualifying phase. The 2020 Summer Olympics were postponed to 2021 due to the COVID-19 pandemic. Similar to 2012 and 2016 format, a qualification system has been set up for both slalom and sprint canoeing at these games. The quotas have already been set for each event by the International Canoe Federation in October 2018.

== Qualification summary ==
NOC	Slalom				Sprint												Total	
NOC	K1 M	C1 M	K1 W	C1 W	Men						Women						Boats	Athletes
NOC	K1 M	C1 M	K1 W	C1 W	K1 200	K1 1000	K2 1000	K4 500	C1 1000	C2 1000	K1 200	K1 500	K2 500	K4 500	C1 200	C2 500	Boats	Athletes
Algeria											Yes						1	1
Andorra			Yes														1	1
Argentina	Yes				Yes	Yes					Yes						4	4
Australia	Yes	Yes		Yes			Yes	Yes					Yes	Yes		Yes	8	16
Austria	Yes		Yes	Yes									Yes				4	5
Belarus						Yes		Yes				Yes		Yes	Yes	Yes	6	12
Belgium	Yes					Yes							Yes				3	4
Belize						Yes											1	1
Brazil	Yes			Yes		Yes			Yes	Yes							5	5
Bulgaria															Yes		1	1
Canada	Yes	Yes	Yes	Yes			Yes	Yes		Yes		Yes		Yes	Yes		10	18
Chile																Yes	1	2
China	Yes		Yes	Yes		Yes	Yes		Yes	Yes			Yes	Yes	Yes	Yes	11	18
Cook Islands			Yes			Yes					Yes						3	3
Croatia		Yes										Yes			Yes		3	3
Cuba									Yes	Yes						Yes	3	5
Czech Republic	Yes	Yes	Yes	Yes			Yes		Yes	Yes							7	9
Denmark												Yes		Yes			2	4
Egypt					Yes							Yes					2	2
France	Yes	Yes	Yes	Yes	Yes		Yes		Yes		Yes	Yes		Yes			10	13
Germany	Yes	Yes	Yes	Yes			Yes	Yes	Yes	Yes			Yes	Yes		Yes	11	21
Great Britain	Yes	Yes	Yes	Yes	Yes						Yes	Yes			Yes		8	8
Hungary				Yes			Yes	Yes		Yes	Yes	Yes		Yes	Yes	Yes	9	18
Iran						Yes											1	1
Ireland		Yes															1	1
Italy	Yes		Yes	Yes	Yes		Yes				Yes						6	7
Japan	Yes	Yes	Yes	Yes				Yes	Yes			Yes				Yes	8	12
Kazakhstan		Yes	Yes							Yes	Yes	Yes				Yes	6	7
Latvia					Yes												1	1
Lithuania					Yes												1	1
Mexico			Yes														1	1
Moldova									Yes							Yes	2	3
Morocco	Yes		Yes														2	2
Mozambique									Yes								1	1
Netherlands			Yes														1	1
New Zealand	Yes		Yes				Yes					Yes		Yes			5	8
Nigeria															Yes		1	1
Norway						Yes											1	1
Poland	Yes	Yes	Yes	Yes					Yes	Yes	Yes		Yes	Yes	Yes		10	13
Portugal	Yes					Yes		Yes			Yes	Yes					5	8
Refugee Olympic Team						Yes											1	1
Romania										Yes							1	2
ROC	Yes		Yes		Yes	Yes		Yes		Yes	Yes			Yes		Yes	9	17
Samoa					Yes				Yes			Yes					3	3
São Tomé and Príncipe										Yes							1	2
Senegal		Yes															1	1
Serbia					Yes	Yes						Yes					3	3
Slovakia	Yes	Yes	Yes	Yes		Yes		Yes									6	9
Slovenia	Yes	Yes	Yes	Yes									Yes				5	6
South Korea					Yes												1	1
Spain	Yes	Yes	Yes	Yes			Yes	Yes		Yes	Yes	Yes			Yes		10	15
Sweden	Yes				Yes							Yes					3	3
Switzerland	Yes	Yes	Yes														3	3
Chinese Taipei			Yes														1	1
Thailand															Yes		1	1
Tunisia						Yes			Yes				Yes				3	4
Ukraine			Yes						Yes	Yes			Yes	Yes		Yes	6	11
United States	Yes	Yes		Yes											Yes		4	4
Uzbekistan																Yes	1	2
Total: 59 NOCs	24	17	24	17	12	15	10	10	13	14	16	11	8	12	14	13	230	331

== Slalom ==
For the slalom events, the men and women competed for each in C-1 and K-1. Qualifications were allocated to NOCs, not to specific competitors. NOCs were limited to one boat per event. Qualification spots were earned as follows:

- World Championships: The top placed boats (considering only one boat per NOC) earned their NOCs a qualification. 18 qualification spots were available in the K-1 events, and 11 in the C-1.
- Continental Qualification Events: Only NOCs that did not earn qualification in a given event through the World Championships were eligible. For the K-1 and C-1 events, 1 qualification spot was available for each continent.
- Host country: Japan, as the host country, is guaranteed one entry in each event if not already qualified.
- Tripartite Commission: Canoeing (both slalom and sprint) has a total of 2 qualification spots that would be awarded through Tripartite Commission invitations.
- Reallocation: Unused quota spots were reallocated.

=== Timeline ===
Event	Date	Venue
2019 ICF Canoe Slalom World Championships	September 25–29, 2019	La Seu d'Urgell, Spain
2020 Oceania Canoe Slalom Championships	February 1–3, 2020	Auckland, New Zealand
2021 African Canoe Slalom Olympic Qualifiers	March 20–21, 2021	La Seu d'Urgell, Spain
2021 Asian Canoe Slalom Olympic Qualifiers	May 1–2, 2021	Pattaya, Thailand
2021 European Canoe Slalom Championships	May 7–9, 2021	Ivrea, Italy

=== Qualification table ===
Event	Men's K-1	Men's C-1	Women's K-1	Women's C-1
Host nation	Japan	Japan	Japan	Japan
2019 World Championships	Czech Republic; Great Britain; Portugal; ROC; Australia; Spain; Slovakia; France; Germany; Canada; Italy; Austria; Switzerland; Slovenia; United States; Brazil; Sweden; New Zealand	France; Poland; Slovenia; Slovakia; Switzerland; Ireland; Spain; Canada; Croatia; Czech Republic; Great Britain	Czech Republic; Slovakia; Austria; Ukraine; France; Great Britain; New Zealand; Poland; Netherlands; Germany; Andorra; Spain; Slovenia; Italy; ROC; Cook Islands; Canada; China	Spain; Australia; Germany; Czech Republic; Austria; Brazil; United States; Great Britain; Italy; France; Slovenia
2020 Oceania Championships	—*	Australia	—*	—*
2021 African Championships	Morocco	Senegal	Morocco	—*
Pan American Allocation	Argentina	United States	Mexico	Canada
2021 Asian Qualifier	China	Kazakhstan	Kazakhstan	China
2021 European Championships	Poland	Germany	Switzerland	Slovakia
Tripartite Invitation	—	—	—	—
Reallocation	Belgium*	—	Chinese Taipei*	Poland*; ~~Hungary~~; Switzerland*
Total	24	17	24	17

Italic: National federation has qualified a boat but the athlete that did this was already counted in another boat
* No continental qualifying race held as less than three nations are eligible.
** National federation is limited to two athlete quota places at a continental qualifying event.

== Sprint ==
NOCs are limited to one boat per event, and in kayaking to six men and six women positions. In Canoeing, the maximum is three men and three women. Meaning a country can enter up to 18 athletes overall. Qualification enables an NOC to participate, not necessarily in the person of the paddler who gained the place. Quotas given are for boats. Qualification spots were earned as follows:

- World Championships: The top placed boats (considering only one boat per NOC) earned their NOCs a qualification. 5 boat qualification spots were available in the K-1 events with an additional place reserved for the host country each in the men's 1000 m and women's 500 m, 6 in the K-2 events, 10 in the K-4 events, 6 in the C-1 events (1 of which was reserved for the host country in the 1000 metre event), and 8 in the C-2 event.
- World Cup 2: The top placed boat (considering only one boat per NOC) in each individual event earned their NOCs a qualification.
- Continental Qualification Events: Only NOCs that did not earn qualification in a given event through the World Championships were eligible. For the K-1 and C-1 events, 1 boat qualification spot was available for each continent (except that Europe received 2 spots). For the K-2 and C-2 events, Europe was guaranteed two boat qualification spots but only 6 total qualification spots were available for the remaining 4 continents; these were assigned to continents based on World Championship results: the best ranked non-qualifying NOCs from four different continents at the World Championships earned their continent one boat qualification place.
- Host country: Japan, as the host country, was guaranteed entries in certain events as listed in the World Championship section.
- Tripartite Commission: Canoeing (both slalom and sprint) had a total of 2 qualification spots that would be awarded through Tripartite Commission invitations.
- Reallocation: Unused quota spots were reallocated. In practice, this was used where some of an NOC's competitors in a larger boat category also competed in a smaller category, freeing up the athlete quota spot that NOC had earned in the smaller category.

=== Timeline ===
Event	Date	Venue
2019 ICF Canoe Sprint World Championships	August 21–25, 2019	Szeged, Hungary
2019 African Games	August 26–31, 2019	Rabat, Morocco
2020 Oceania Canoe Sprint Qualifier	February 14–16, 2020	Penrith, Australia
2021 Asian Canoe Sprint Olympic Qualifiers	May 5–7, 2021	Pattaya, Thailand
2021 European Canoe Sprint Qualifier	May 12–13, 2021	Szeged, Hungary
2021 ICF Canoe Sprint World Cup 2	May 19–23, 2021	Barnaul, Russia

=== Qualification table ===
The following boats and athletes qualified.

Event	2019 World Championships	Continental qualification					2021 World Cup 2	Total
Men Kayak	2019 World Championships	Europe	Americas	Asia	Africa	Oceania	2021 World Cup 2	Total
K-1 200 m	Great Britain; Serbia; France; Italy; Sweden	ROC; Latvia	Argentina	South Korea	~~South Africa~~; Egypt	Samoa	Lithuania	12
K-1 1000 m	Czech Republic; Portugal; Slovakia; ROC; Belarus; France; Argentina; Serbia	Belgium; Norway	Brazil; Belize^{TR}	Iran	Tunisia	Cook Islands	China; Refugee Olympic Team^{IP}	15
K-2 1000 m	Germany; Spain; France; Czech Republic; Australia; Italy	Hungary	Canada	China	—	New Zealand	—	10
K-4 500 m	Germany; Spain; Slovakia; ROC; Hungary; Portugal; Belarus; Australia; Japan; Canada	—	—	—	—	—	—	10
Event	2019 World Championships	Continental qualification					2021 World Cup 2	Total
Men Canoe	2019 World Championships	Europe	Americas	Asia	Africa	Oceania	2021 World Cup 2	Total
C-1 1000 m	Brazil; Poland; France; Germany; Czech Republicº; Japan*	Ukraine	Cuba	China	Tunisia; Mozambique^{TR}	~~Australia~~; Samoa	Moldova	13
C-2 1000 m	China; Cuba; Brazil; Germany; Romania; Poland; ROC; Ukraine; Czech Republicº	Spain; Hungary	Canada	Kazakhstan	São Tomé and Príncipe	—	—	14
Event	2019 World Championships	Continental qualification					2021 World Cup 2	Total
Women Kayak	2019 World Championships	Europe	Americas	Asia	Africa	Oceania	2021 World Cup 2	Total
K-1 200 m	New Zealand; Poland; Denmark; Spain; Ukraine; Hungary; Serbia; Portugal	Great Britain; Italy	Argentina	Japan	Algeria	Cook Islands	ROC	16
K-1 500 m	New Zealand; Belarus; Hungary; Serbia; Denmarkº; Sweden; Great Britain	Spain; Croatia	Canada	Kazakhstan	Egypt	Samoa	Portugal	11
K-2 500 m	Belarus; Poland; Slovenia; Belgium; France; Ukraine^{AQ} China	Germany	Austria**	—	~~South Africa~~; Tunisia	Australia	—	8
K-4 500 m	Hungary; Belarus; Poland; New Zealand; France; Germany; Australia; Ukraine; China; Canada; ROC; Denmarkº	—	—	—	—	—	—	12
Event	2019 World Championships	Continental qualification					2020 World Cup 2	Total
Women Canoe	2019 World Championships	Europe	Americas	Asia	Africa	Oceania	2020 World Cup 2	Total
C-1 200 m	United States; ~~ROC~~; Belarus; Chile; Canada; Poland; Ukraine; Hungary; Great Britain	Spain	Bulgaria**	Thailand	Nigeria	~~New Zealand~~; China	Croatia	14
C-2 500 m	China; Hungary; Belarus; Germany; Uzbekistan; Cuba; Ukraine; Chile	Moldova; ROC	Japan**	Kazakhstan	—	Australia	—	13

^* Host quota
- Italic: National federation has qualified a boat but the athlete that did this was already counted in another boat
- ^{AQ}: National federation has qualified a boat but one of two athletes that did this was already counted in another boat
- ^{IP}: Invitational place given by the IOC
- ^{TR}: National federation has received an invitation from the Tripartite Commission
- ^: ICF decided that some of the events in Africa and Oceania needed to be reattributed to the World Championships lists because the events seen as invalid due to lack of eligible competitors.
- º: ICF decided that two quota places were combined and reallocated to the next best ranked NOC not qualified in a larger boat category, should they be available from team boats in the same gender and category.
- South Africa declined all their quotas obtained in African Games 2019.
- ** Owing to the cancellation of the Americas qualifiers, ICF decides to allocate the quotas according to the results from the 2019 World Championships. Where insufficient athletes were available from the Americas, quotas were re-allocated.

In the men's kayak category, Spain had qualifying boats in the K-4 500m, K-2 1000m, and K-1 200m; because each NOC could earn a maximum of 6 athlete spots, the K-1 200m athlete quota spot was reallocated to Sweden. Hungary qualified boats in the K-4, K-2, and K-1 1000m, requiring reallocation of the K-1 1000m place. Josef Dostál of the Czech Republic qualified in the K-1 1000m and was also a part of a qualifying K-2 1000m boat. The athlete quota spot from the K-1 was reallocated. The two spots went to the next best in K-1 1000m, but could not be allocated to France (Étienne Hubert was France's K-1 1000m athlete, but had already earned a spot in K-2) or to Spain (which already had 6 athlete quotas), so went to Belarus and Argentina as the first two possible recipients. Japan earned a team spot in the K-4, so its host spot in the K-1 1000m also head to be reallocated; it could not go to Australia (which had 6 places already), so 11th-placed Serbia qualified.

In the men's canoe category, Isaquias Queiroz of Brazil qualified in both the C-1 and C-2 events; his C-1 athlete quota spot was reallocated. This spot went to the next-best NOC in C-2, the Czech Republic, as it could fill the C-2 boat because one the two athletes (Martin Fuksa) had already earned an athlete quota spot in C-1 and only 1 spot was needed to fill the boat.

In the women's kayak category, numerous quota spots were reallocated, in a two-step process. The first step was that athletes who qualified in both K-1 events were assigned the 500m place and the 200m place was reallocated to the next boat in the 200m. Lisa Carrington of New Zealand and Emma Jørgensen fit that criterion; they were treated as qualifying in the 500m and their 200m spots reallocated to Hungary and Serbia. Because the Serbia spot would have gone to Milica Starović, who (like Carrington and Jørgensen) had qualified in the 500m, that spot was further reallocated to Portugal.

The second step in women's kayak was for athletes qualifying in multiple boat sizes. Volha Khudzenka of Belarus was part of the K-4, K-2, and K-1 500m boats that qualified, requiring reallocation of her K-2 and K-1 quota places. Maryna Litvinchuk was also in both the K-4 and K-2 boats for Belarus, so her K-2 quota place had to reallocated. Karolina Naja and Anna Puławska were in Poland's K-4 and K-2 boats; both of their quota places from the K-2 were reallocated. The same was true of Sarah Guyot and Manon Hostens of France and Mariya Povkh of Ukraine. Mariia Kichasova-Skoryk, also of Ukraine, qualified in both the K-4 boat and the K-1 200m; her K-1 spot was reallocated. Finally, Carrington was part of New Zealand's K-4 boat, so her K-1 500m spot was reallocated. These 10 spots were allocated to fill K-4 boats (ROC received 4 and Denmark netted 3, adding to Jørgensen's K-1 500m spot). The remaining 3 places were not enough to qualify Great Britain in the K-4, so the next step was allocating them to the K-2. The 3 remaining spots then went first to China in the K-2. This left 1 spot; Austria was next in the K-2 but neither athlete was qualified yet, so the spot would not fill the boat and therefore went to the K-1 500m. Sweden got the quota as next NOC in the K-1 500m.

In the women's canoe, María Mailliard of Chile qualified in both the C-2 and the C-1; her quota place was reallocated. The 1 reallocated spot was not enough to fill a C-2 boat (Japan did not have a qualifier in C-1), so went to the next C-1 competitor: Poland.
