= Hiroyuki Nagao =

Japanese canoeist

Hiroyuki Nagao (長尾寛征, Nagao Hiroyuki, born 28 August 1980 in Yokohama) is a Japanese slalom canoeist who competed at the international level from 2003 to 2011. He was eliminated in the semifinals of the C2 event at the 2008 Summer Olympics in Beijing, finishing in 9th place.

His partner in the C2 boat from 2007 to 2011 was Masatoshi Sanma.

== World Cup individual podiums ==
Season	Date	Venue	Position	Event
2008	18 May 2008	Nakhon Nayok	2nd	C2^{1}

^{1} Asia Canoe Slalom Championship counting for World Cup points
