= Shu Yong =

Chinese canoeist

Personal information
- Native name: 舒用
- Nationality: Chinese
- Born: Mayang, Hunan

Sport
- Country: China
- Sport: male slalom canoeist
Medal record
Men's canoe slalom
Representing China
Asian Championships
Gold medal – first place	2000 Changzhou	K1

Shu Yong
- Traditional Chinese: 舒用
- Simplified Chinese: 舒用
Transcriptions
Standard Mandarin
- Hanyu Pinyin: Shū Yòng

Shu Yong (Chinese: 舒用; pinyin: Shū Yòng; born in Mayang, Hunan) is a former canoeist. Shu was the gold medalist at slalom g-1 events in two national games and the gold medalist at the 2000 Asian Championships.
