= Masatoshi Sanma =

Japanese canoeist

Medal record

Men's canoe slalom

Representing Japan

Asian Championships
Gold medal – first place	2000 Changzhou	C2

Masatoshi Sanma (三馬正敏, Sanma Masatoshi; born 18 August 1977 in Naka, Tokushima) is a Japanese slalom canoeist who competed at the international level from 1997 to 2011. He was eliminated in the semifinals of the C2 event at the 2008 Summer Olympics in Beijing, finishing in 9th place.

His partner in the C2 boat was Hiroyuki Nagao.

== World Cup individual podiums ==
Season	Date	Venue	Position	Event
2008	18 May 2008	Nakhon Nayok	2nd	C2^{1}

^{1} Asia Canoe Slalom Championship counting for World Cup points
