= 2009 National Games of China =

Multi-sports competition

11th National Games of the People's Republic of China
- Host city: Shandong
- Country: China
- Motto: 和谐中国 全民全运
- Teams: 46
- Athletes: 10,991
- Events: 33 sports
- Opening: October 16, 2009
- Closing: October 28, 2009
- Opened by: Hu Jintao
- Closed by: Wen Jiabao
- Main venue: Jinan Olympic Sports Center Stadium
- Website: sport.gov.cn/n4/n65/

The 11th National Games of China were held in various cities in Shandong from October 16 to October 28, 2009. Represented were 33 sports, 43 disciplines and 362 events, including 4 winter sports which were held in Shenyang, Changchun and Qingdao between January and April 2009.

In all, a total of 1241 medals were awarded. The host province of Shandong came first on the medals table with 63 gold, 40 silver and 43 bronze. The games saw the triumphant return from injury for Olympic 110m hurdles champion Liu Xiang. Swimmer Liu Zige also broke the world record in the women's 200 metres butterfly, taking 2 seconds off from the previous record.

The 11th National Games was labelled by some as "China's Olympics", which is reflective of growing significance of the National Games in China.

== Background ==
Following the 9th National Games in 2001, officials decided to scrap the decades-old convention of rotating the host duties between Beijing, Shanghai and Guangdong. The State Council of China, decided that a bidding process would decide the host and any province, municipality and autonomous region was eligible to apply. In 2005, Shandong won the right to host the 11th National Games being the only applicant province with the permission of State Council and the State General Administration of Sports.

== Development and preparation ==
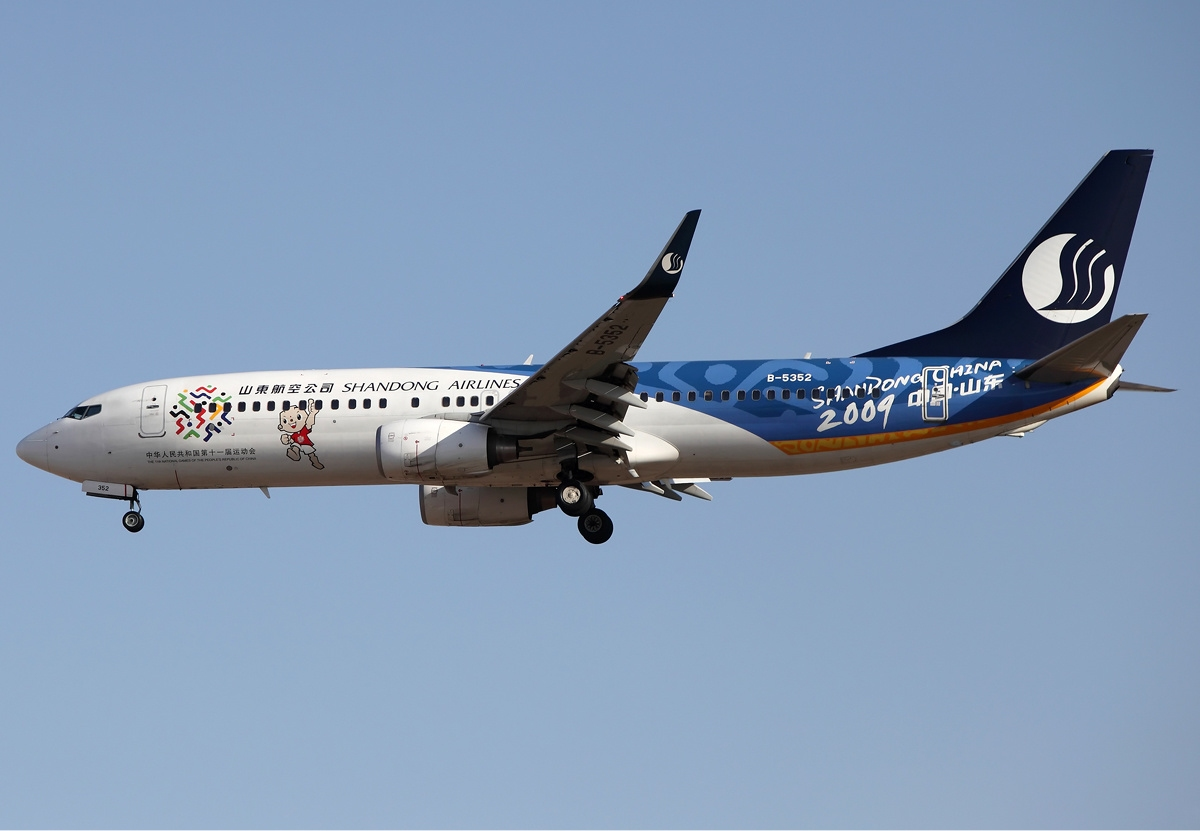
Shandong Airlines Boeing 737-800 in a livery promoting the Games.

=== Marketing ===
The logo for the games was designed to embody the concept of "Harmonious China, Energetic Shandong" (和谐中华, 活力山东). The logo is derived from the geometric patterns on artifacts of the Warring States period and the Western Han Dynasty unearthed in Jinan, Shandong. This represents the traditional folk culture of Shandong. The logo also depicts an abstract image of 11 athletes in motion which symbolises the 11th National Games. It is composed of the colours red, black, yellow, green and blue which are the colours of the Olympic rings and refer to the success of the 2008 Beijing Olympic Games. The final logo was selected from 3040 entries in a public competition launched in 2007 across mainland China, Hong Kong and Macau.

The mascot for the games was a cartoon character called "Taishan Boy" (泰山童子). It alludes the majestic stone of the Shandong's Mount Taishan. The mascot, dressed in a red shirt and white shorts, is an athletic figure giving the thumbs-up. According to the designer said, the character symbolizes "the spirit of life", "health and longevity" and "the enthusiasm and fighting spirit of the host".

=== Broadcasting ===
The 11th National Games were broadcast both on CCTV-1 and CCTV-5, as well as on the local Shandong Television station.

== Torch relay ==
The torch of the 12th National Games, first unveiled on April 28, 2009, is based on the concept of ruyi (如意), a traditional Chinese ceremonial scepter. The torch is 69 cm long. It is designed to resemble the ruyi with gold and silver being the colour theme. At the top, the golden willow pattern is combined with the grey ruyi stripes. The mouth of the torch is shaped like the lotus, which is the city flower of Jinan. Also, the main venue for the games, the Jinan Olympic Sports Center, is also known as Donghe Xiliu (East Willow, West Lotus) due to its distinctive architecture.

Mirroring the 2008 Olympic Games, a torch relay began on August 1, 2009, at Mount Taishan, a cultural site with a tradition of spiritual pilgrimages. The flame was lit in a sun ray ceremony by Beijing Olympics gold medalists archer Zhang Juanjuan and diver Wang Feng. On August 16, the Chairman of the Standing Committee of the National People's Congress Wu Bangguo received the torch at the Great Hall of the People which officially marked the start of the relay. The torch was then carried on a two-month relay around China, including through the major centres of Shandong.

The route of the torch relay was (in chronological order): Mount Taishan, Shandong → Beijing → Tianjin → Shijiazhuang, Hebei → Shenyang, Liaoning → Changchun, Jilin → Harbin, Heilongjiang → Hohhot, Inner Mongolia → Taiyuan, Shandong → Xi'an, Shaanxi → Lanzhou, Gansu → Xining, Qinghai → Ürümqi, Xinjiang → Lhasa, Tibet → Kunming, Yunnan → Chengdu, Sichuan → Chongqing → Guiyang, Guizhou → Nanning, Guangxi → Changsha, Hunan → Zhengzhou, Henan → Hefei, Anhui → Nanchang, Jiangxi → Guangzhou, Guangdong → Haikou, Hainan → Macau → Hong Kong → Fuzhou, Fujian → Hangzhou, Zhejiang → Shanghai → Nanjing, Jiangsu.

The Shandong leg included the following cities (in chronological order): Qingdao → Weihai → Yantai → Weifang → Rizhao → Linyi → Zaozhuang → Jining → Heze → Liaocheng → Dezhou → Binzhou → Dongying → Zibo → Laiwu → Tai'an → Jinan.

== The Games ==
=== Opening ceremony ===
The Chinese President, Hu Jintao, started the official opening ceremony on October 16, which featured an extensive firework display and a large scale music and dance performance at the Jinan Olympic Sports Center Stadium, nicknamed Xiliu (西柳), literally "West Willow", due to its resemblance to the city tree, the Chinese willow. IOC President Jacques Rogge and a dozen IOC members also attended the ceremony. Liu Peng, who had headed the organising committee for the 2008 Beijing Olympics, stressed the role the Games played in improving the standard of sport in China, and also its importance in promoting fitness as a whole. Following this, the torch was brought into the stadium and the cauldron was lit, signalling the climax of the opening ceremony.

Sequence of events:

- Shandong Governor Jiang Daming presides over the ceremony.
- Entry of the Chinese national flag, flag of the National Games of the People's Republic of China and flag of the 2009 National Games of China into the stadium.
- Entry of representatives of the 46 participating delegates.
- Raising of the Chinese national flag, to the Chinese national anthem, March of the Volunteers.
- Welcoming remarks by CPC Shandong Committee Secretaries, Jiang Yikang.
- Speech by the director of the 11th National Games Organizing Committee and the State General Administration of Sport Secretary, Liu Peng.
- Chinese President Hu Jintao announced the opening of the National Games.
- Fireworks display.
- Raising of the flag of the National Games of the People's Republic of China and the flag of the 2009 National Games of China, to the anthem of the 2009 National Games of China.
- Athletes Oath.
- Judges Oath.
- Wei Wei and Lei Yan sing the 11 Games theme song "Gong Yuan Jing Cai" (共圆精彩, roughly translated as "Truly Spectacular").
- Artist performance
  - Introduction
  - Section 1: Qilu Spirit
  - Section 2: Harmonious Wind
  - Section 3: Ode to the Motherland
- Lighting of the cauldron
  - Liu Chunhong
  - Wang Feng, Wang Dan and wife.
  - Xu Zhenchao, Li Denghai, Xu Honggang
  - Wang Hao, Wang Jinbao, Zhang Xiaoping, Lu Xiaolei, Zhou Yuxin
- Opening ceremony theme song
  - "Xiang Qin Xiang Ai" (相亲相爱, literally: "Love Each Other") sung by Sun Nan, Kelly Chen, Germano Guilherme and A-mei

=== Venues ===
The main venues for the games are located in Jinan. The Jinan Olympic Sports Center precinct is home to the main stadium, Jinan Olympic Sports Center Stadium as well as the indoor stadium, aquatic center and tennis center. Many secondary venues were located in regional centers scattered across Shandong, including in Qingdao, Yantai and Weihai.

=== Sports ===
- Aquatics
  - Diving
  - Swimming
  - Synchronized swimming
  - Water polo
- Archery
- Athletics
- Badminton
- Baseball
- Basketball
- Boxing
- Canoeing
- Cycling
- Equestrian
- Fencing
- Football
- Gymnastics
  - Artistic gymnastics
  - Rhythmic gymnastics
  - Trampoline gymnastics
- Handball
- Field hockey
- Judo
- Modern pentathlon
- Rowing
- Sailing
- Shooting
- Softball
- Table tennis
- Taekwondo
- Tennis
- Triathlon
- Volleyball
- Beach volleyball
- Weightlifting
- Wrestling
- Wushu

=== Closing ceremony ===
The closing ceremony was held on October 28, 2009, in the Jinan Olympic Sports Center Gymnasium. It was attended by Chinese Premier Wen Jiabao who officially closed the proceedings.

Events included:

- Government officials, including Wen Jiabao, and other dignitaries enter.
- Athletes enter.
- Song "You Peng Zi Yuan Fang Lai" (有朋自远方来, literally: "Friends from Afar"). Sung by Lian Hua and Wang Li
- Cui Dalin awards athlete Liu Song.
- Wen Jiabao closes the games.
- Artistic performances.
  - Section 1: Memory of Springwater.
  - Section 2: Passion of the Race Track.
- Cauldron is extinguished.
- Artistic performances continued.
  - Section 3: Starry Sky.

== Medal table ==
* Host nation (Shandong)

Rank	Delegation	Gold	Silver	Bronze	Total
1	Shandong*	63	44	46	153
2	PLA	49	39	41	129
3	Jiangsu	48.5	37	36	121.5
4	Guangdong	45	45.5	39.5	130
5	Shanghai	41	34	46.5	121.5
6	Beijing	30	20	29	79
7	Heilongjiang	23.5	23	18.5	65
8	Tianjin	23	14	15.5	52.5
9	Fujian	19	11	21	51
10	Hunan	18	10.5	6	34.5
11	Zhejiang	15.5	13.5	11	40
12	Sichuan	15.5	7	18.5	41
Totals (12 entries)		391	298.5	328.5	1,018

== Participation ==
With a total of 10,991 athletes from 46 delegations, the event was the largest in the Games' history. Among the 46 delegations were 4 municipalities, 22 provincial teams and 5 autonomous regions. Further to this, the People's Liberation Army sent a team, and fourteen sports association teams were entered (generally associations from specific industry groupings or large organisations).

- Anhui
- Beijing
- Chongqing
- Fujian
- Gansu
- Guangdong
- Guangxi
- Guizhou
- Hainan
- Hebei
- Heilongjiang
- Henan
- Hong Kong
- Hubei
- Hunan
- Jiangsu
- Jiangxi
- Jilin
- Liaoning
- Macau
- Inner Mongolia
- Ningxia
- Qinghai
- Shaanxi
- Shandong
- Shanghai
- Shanxi
- Sichuan
- Tianjin
- Tibet
- Xinjiang
- Yunnan
- Zhejiang
- Coal
- Communication
- Qianwei
- Locomotive
- People's Liberation Army
- Xinjiang Production and Construction Corps

== Concerns and controversies ==
=== Doping ===
In order to qualify for the Games, a random selection of 30–50% of the athletes in the track and field events had to pass an exam, which tested knowledge of anti-doping policy, the damage associated with drug use, and methods of self-protection from banned substances. The director of the Chinese Athletics Association, Du Zhaocai, noted that athletes who had previously been banned for failing drugs tests would not be allowed to compete at the Games. This measure was partly a reaction to the positive test of gold medallist Sun Yingjie at the 2005 Games, which had caused bad publicity for the event. Guo Linna, a rower from Henan, was the first athlete to be disqualified after testing positive for 19-norandrostenedione, and shooter Li Jie from Inner Mongolia tested positive for the banned drug propranolol a few days later. Women's 100 metres gold medallist Wang Jing tested positive for epitestosterone and was disqualified from the Games.

=== Alleged match fixing ===
Despite a number of new measures to prevent corruption or abuse of the judging system, one of the judges in the diving competition accused a fellow judge of pre-arranging results. However, an investigation by the State General Administration of Sports detected no signs of foul play.

== See also ==
- 2008 National Winter Games of China
- 2008 Summer Olympics
