= Canoeing at the 2012 Summer Olympics – Men's slalom C-2 =

Men's canoe slalom C-2 at the Games of the XXX Olympiad
- Venue: Lee Valley White Water Centre
- Date: 30 July – 2 August
- Competitors: 28 from 12 nations
- Winning time: 106.41

Medalists
1st place, gold medalist(s)		Tim Baillie; Etienne Stott	Great Britain
2nd place, silver medalist(s)		David Florence; Richard Hounslow	Great Britain
3rd place, bronze medalist(s)		Pavol Hochschorner; Peter Hochschorner	Slovakia

The men's canoe slalom C-2 competition at the 2012 Olympic Games in London took place between 30 July and 2 August at the Lee Valley White Water Centre. Twenty-eight canoeists from 12 countries competed.

Great Britain's Tim Baillie and Etienne Stott won the gold medal and David Florence and Richard Hounslow won silver. Twin brothers Pavol and Peter Hochschorner of Slovakia won the bronze.

== Competition format ==
In the heats, each competitor had two runs; the 10 teams with the best time qualified for the semi-finals. Each semi-final consisted of one run each and the best six qualified for the final. The final saw one run each where the team with the best time won the gold medal.

== Schedule ==
All times are British Summer Time (UTC+01:00)

Date	Time	Round
Monday 30 July 2012	13:30 & 15:42	Heats
Thursday 2 August 2012	13:30	Semi-final
Thursday 2 August 2012	15:18	Final

1st gate set, preliminary heats, July 29, 30.

2nd gate set, semi- & finals, July 31, August 1, 2.

== Results ==
Order	Name	Preliminary Heats						Semifinal			Final		
Order	Name	1st Ride	Pen.	2nd Ride	Pen.	Best	Order	Time	Pen.	Order	Time	Pen.	Order
1st place, gold medalist(s)	Tim Baillie & Etienne Stott (GBR)	100.44	0	102.79	4	100.44	4	110.78	0	6	106.41	0	1
2nd place, silver medalist(s)	David Florence & Richard Hounslow (GBR)	108.23	6	101.08	0	101.08	7	108.93	0	1	106.77	0	2
3rd place, bronze medalist(s)	Pavol Hochschorner & Peter Hochschorner (SVK)	97.52	0	98.60	2	97.52	2	109.04	2	2	108.28	2	3
4	Gauthier Klauss & Matthieu Péché (FRA)	96.98	2	151.03	50	96.98	1	109.27	0	3	109.17	2	4
5	Piotr Szczepański & Marcin Pochwała (POL)	105.58	6	101.00	2	101.00	5	109.81	0	4	110.51	2	5
6	Hu Minghai & Shu Junrong (CHN)	103.36	2	99.05	0	99.05	3	110.70	2	5	112.85	2	6
7	Jaroslav Volf & Ondřej Štěpánek (CZE)	104.00	2	150.87	52	104.00	8	112.22	2	7	did not advance		
8	Sašo Taljat & Luka Božič (SLO)	102.82	2	101.08	2	101.08	6	113.50	2	8	did not advance		
9	Vavřinec Hradilek & Stanislav Ježek (CZE)	106.91	2	DNS		106.91	9	115.50	2	9	did not advance		
10	Kynan Maley & Robin Jeffery (AUS)	113.96	6	107.47	4	107.47	10	162.14	52	10	did not advance		
11	David Schröder & Frank Henze (GER)	107.50	0	107.79	4	107.50	11	did not advance					
12	Eric Hurd & Jeff Larimer (USA)	112.91	6	109.78	6	109.78	12	did not advance					
13	Niccolò Ferrari & Pietro Camporesi (ITA)	120.64	10	111.55	0	111.55	13	did not advance					
14	Mikhail Kuznetsov & Dmitry Larionov (RUS)	112.36	8	155.59	50	112.36	14	did not advance					

== Gallery ==
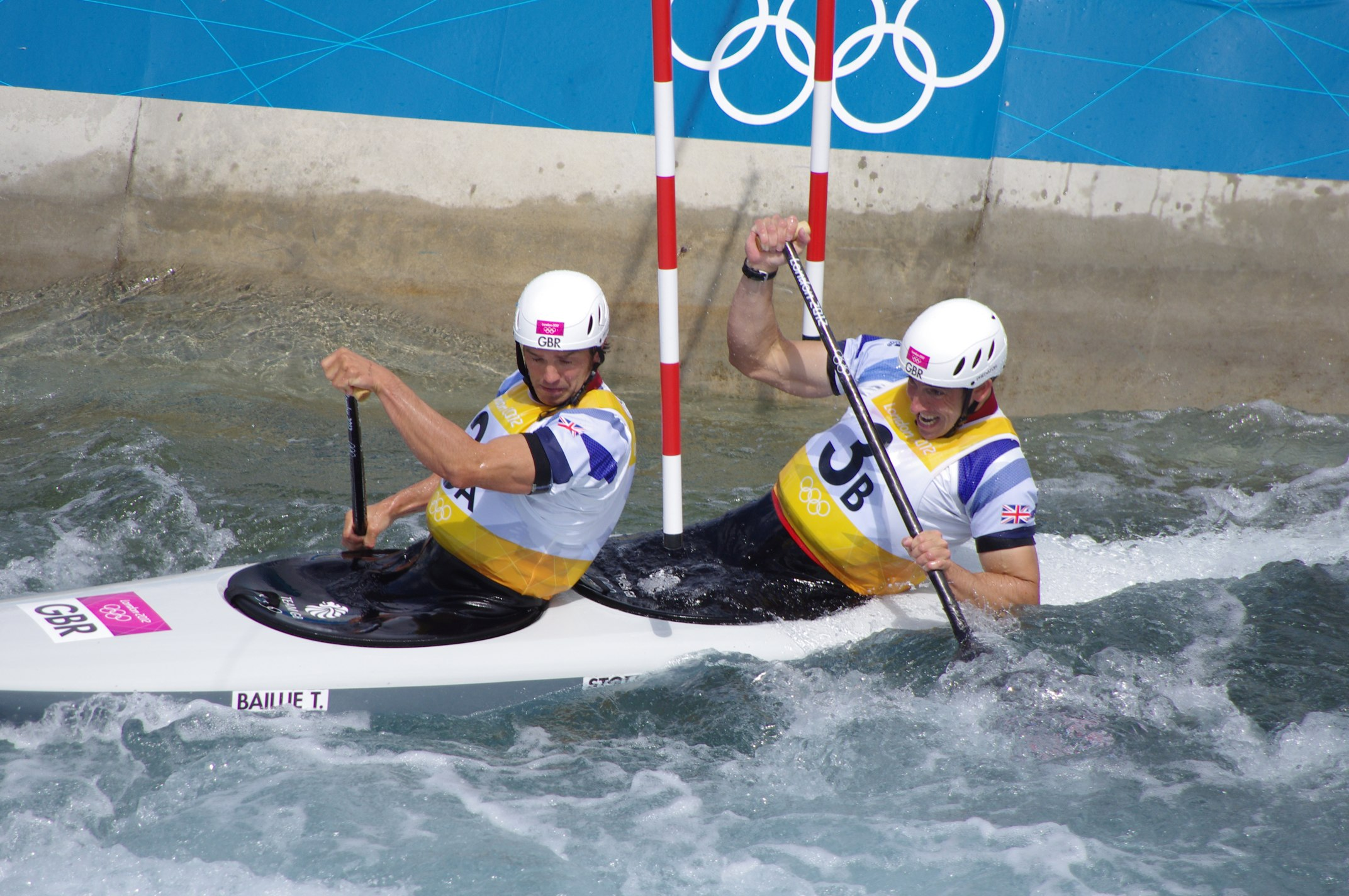
Tim Baillie & Etienne Stott

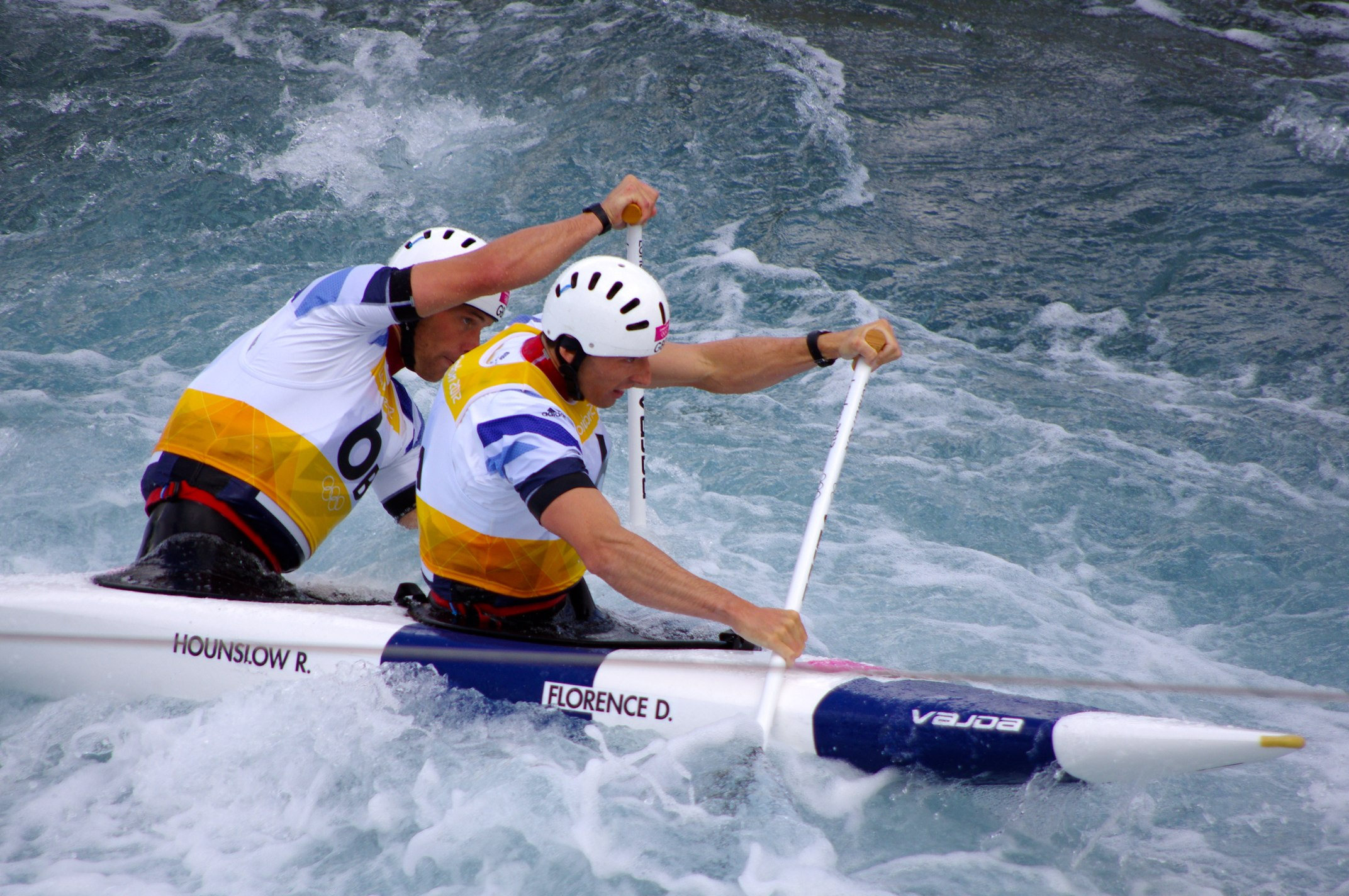
David Florence & Richard Hounslow

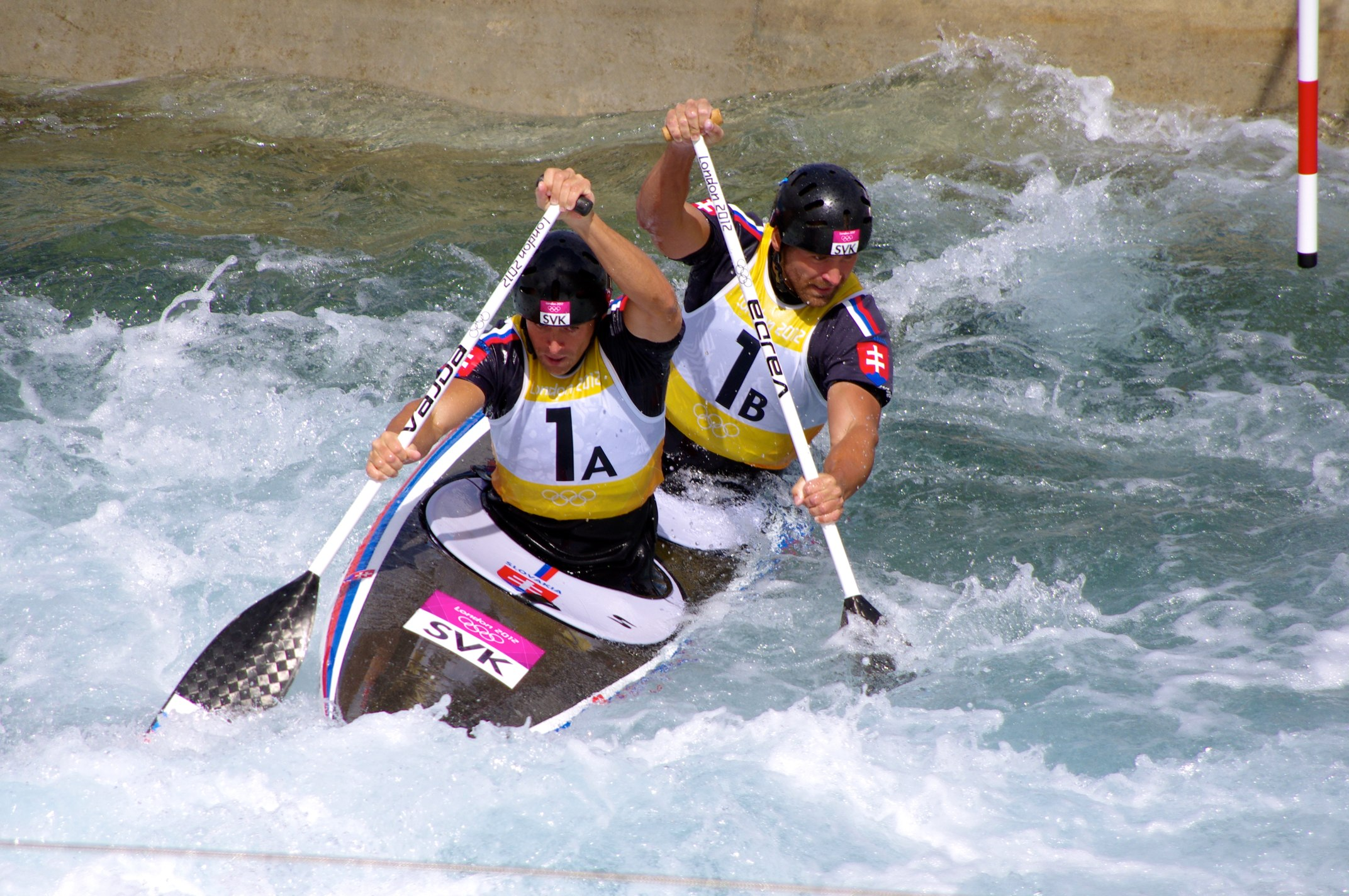
Pavol Hochschorner & Peter Hochschorner

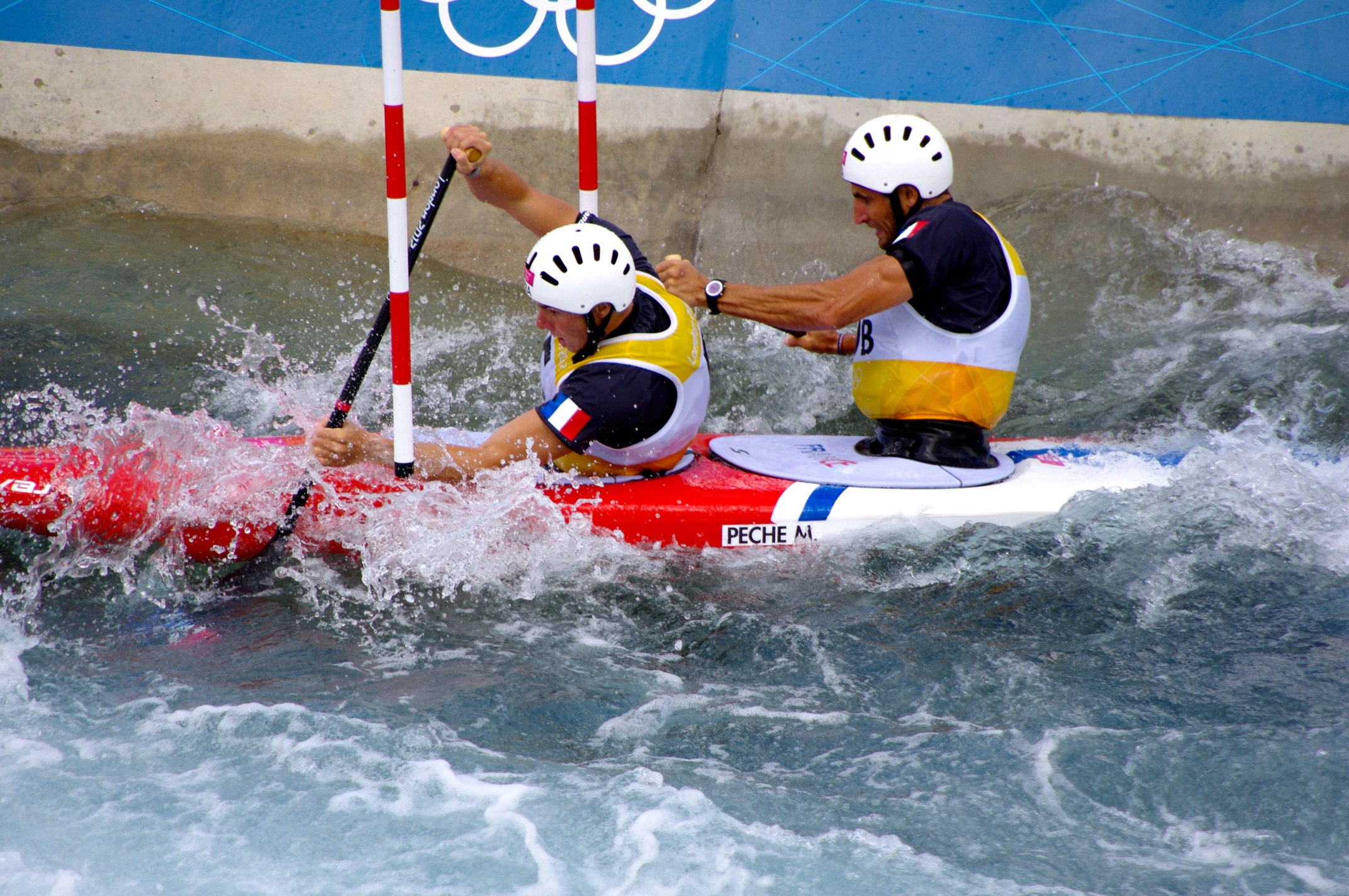
Gauthier Klauss & Matthieu Péché

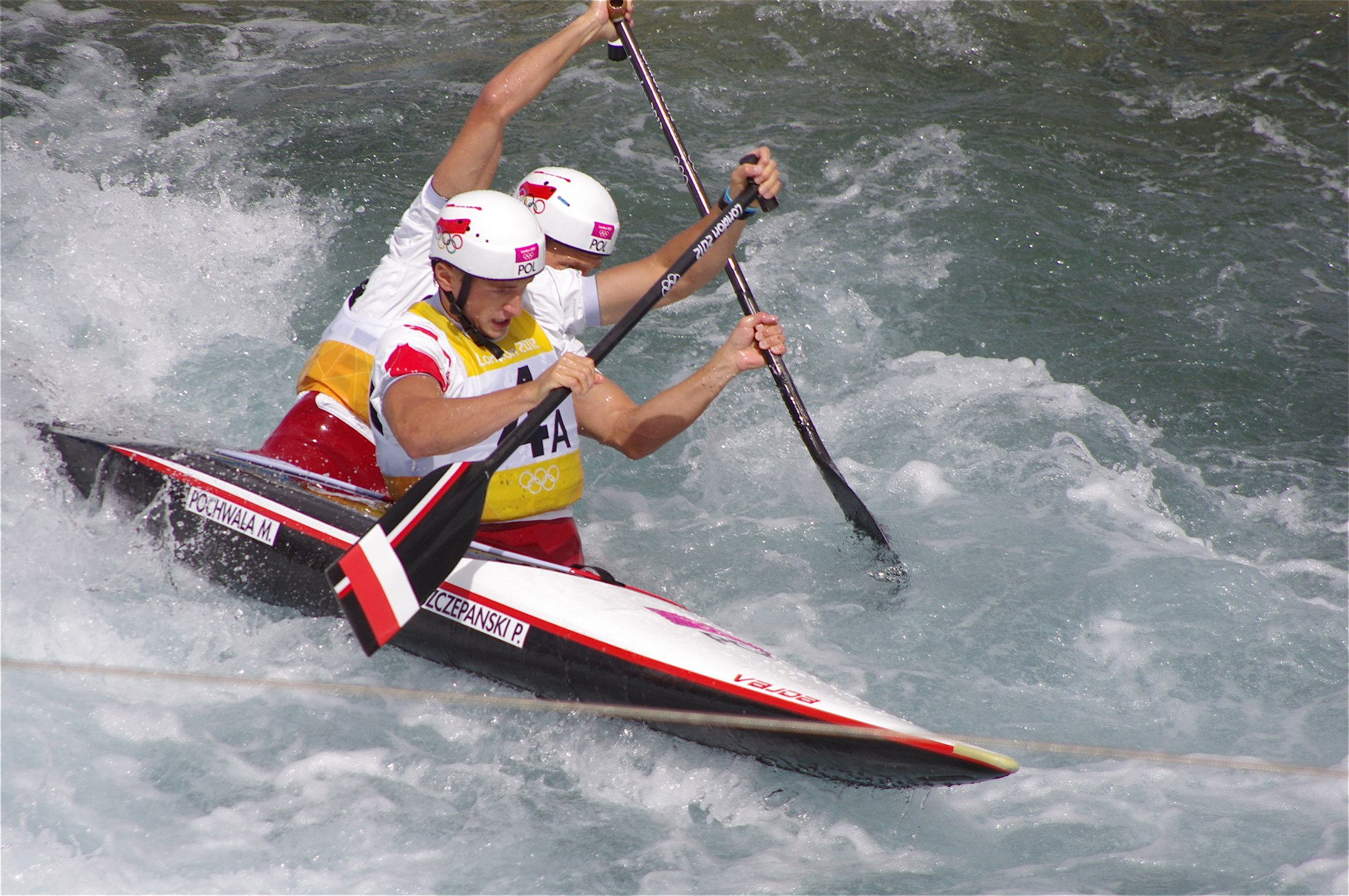
Piotr Szczepański & Marcin Pochwała

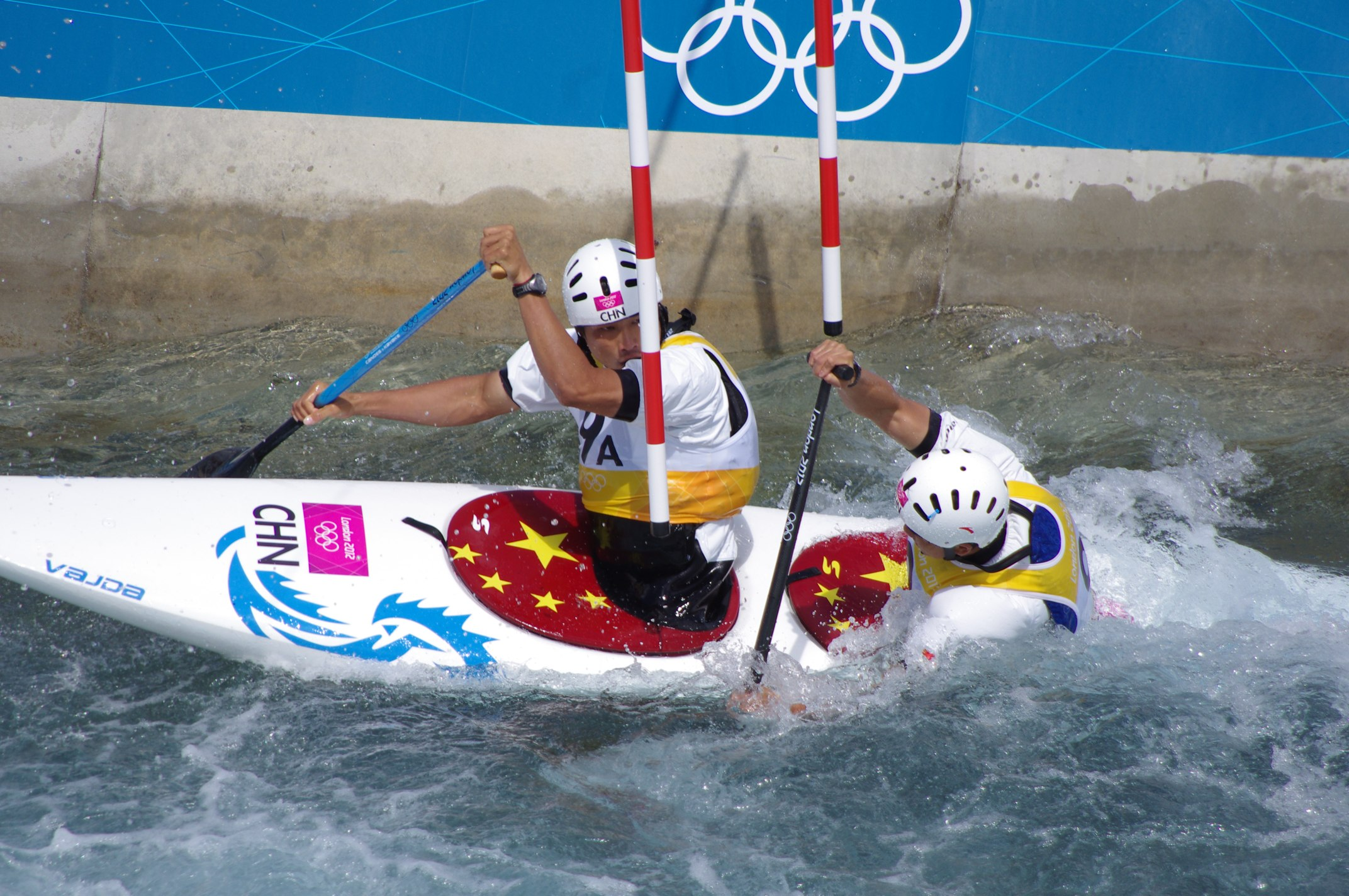
Hu Minghai & Shu Junrong

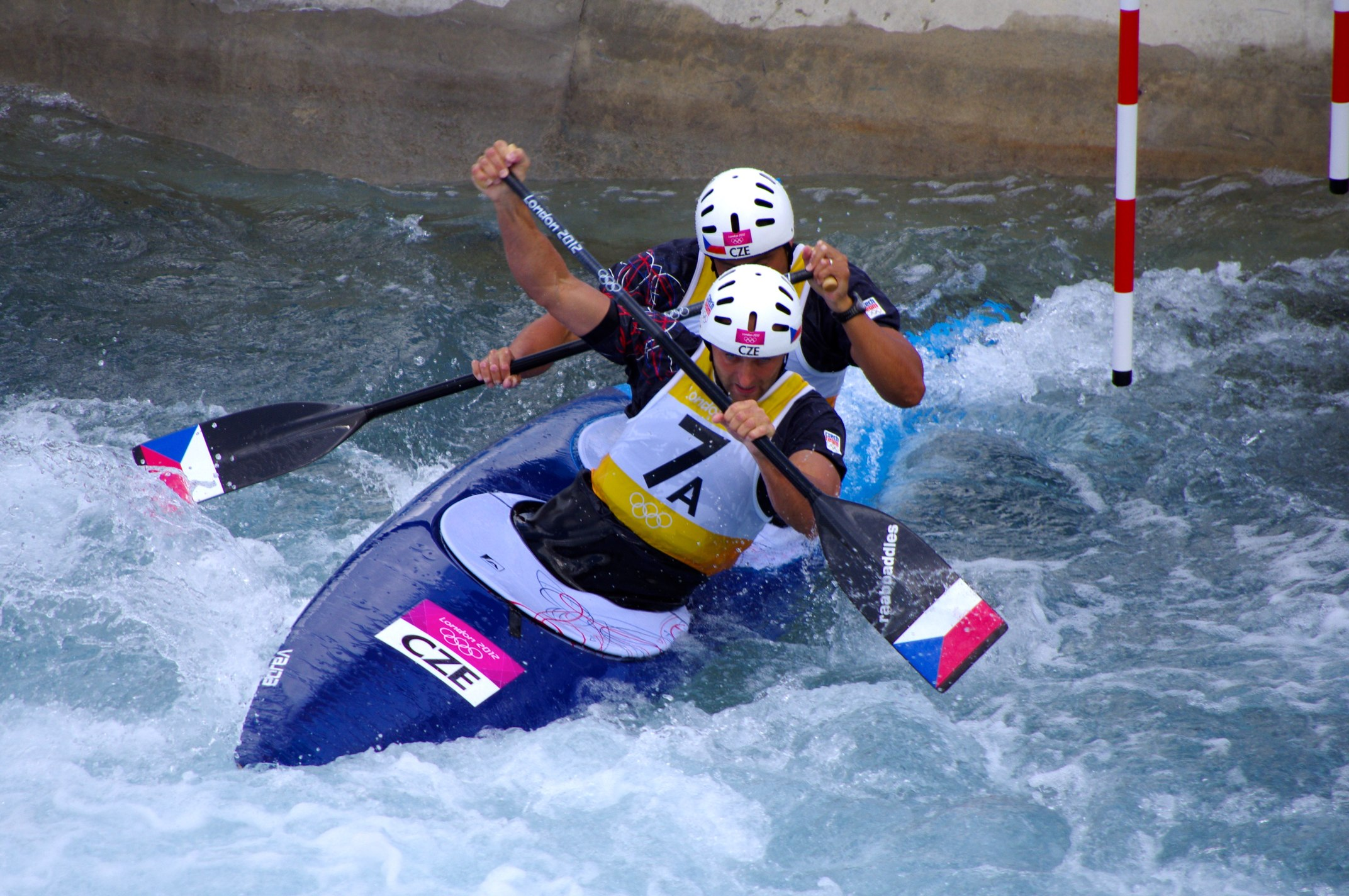
Jaroslav Volf & Ondřej Štěpánek

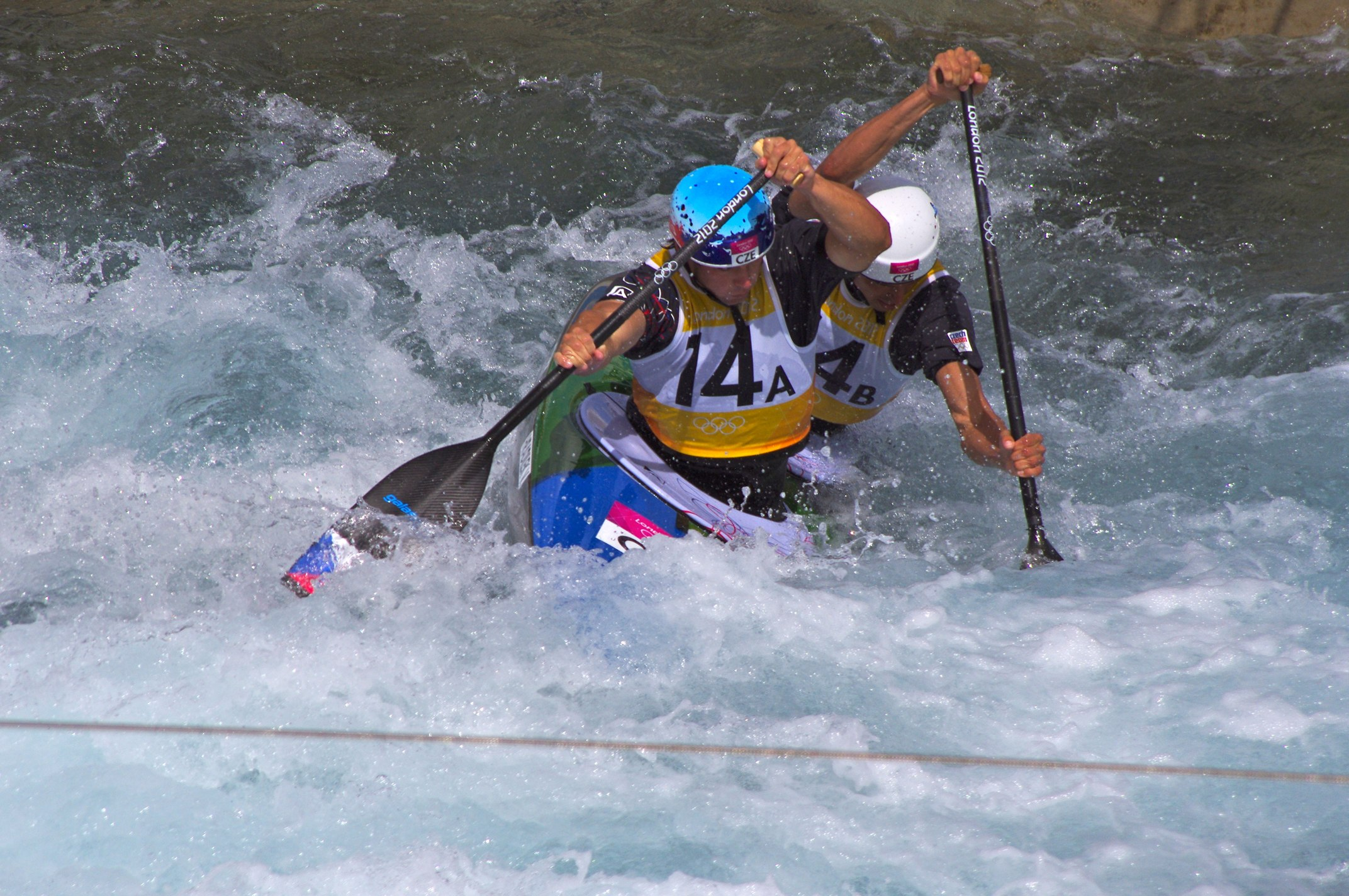
Vavřinec Hradilek & Stanislav Ježek

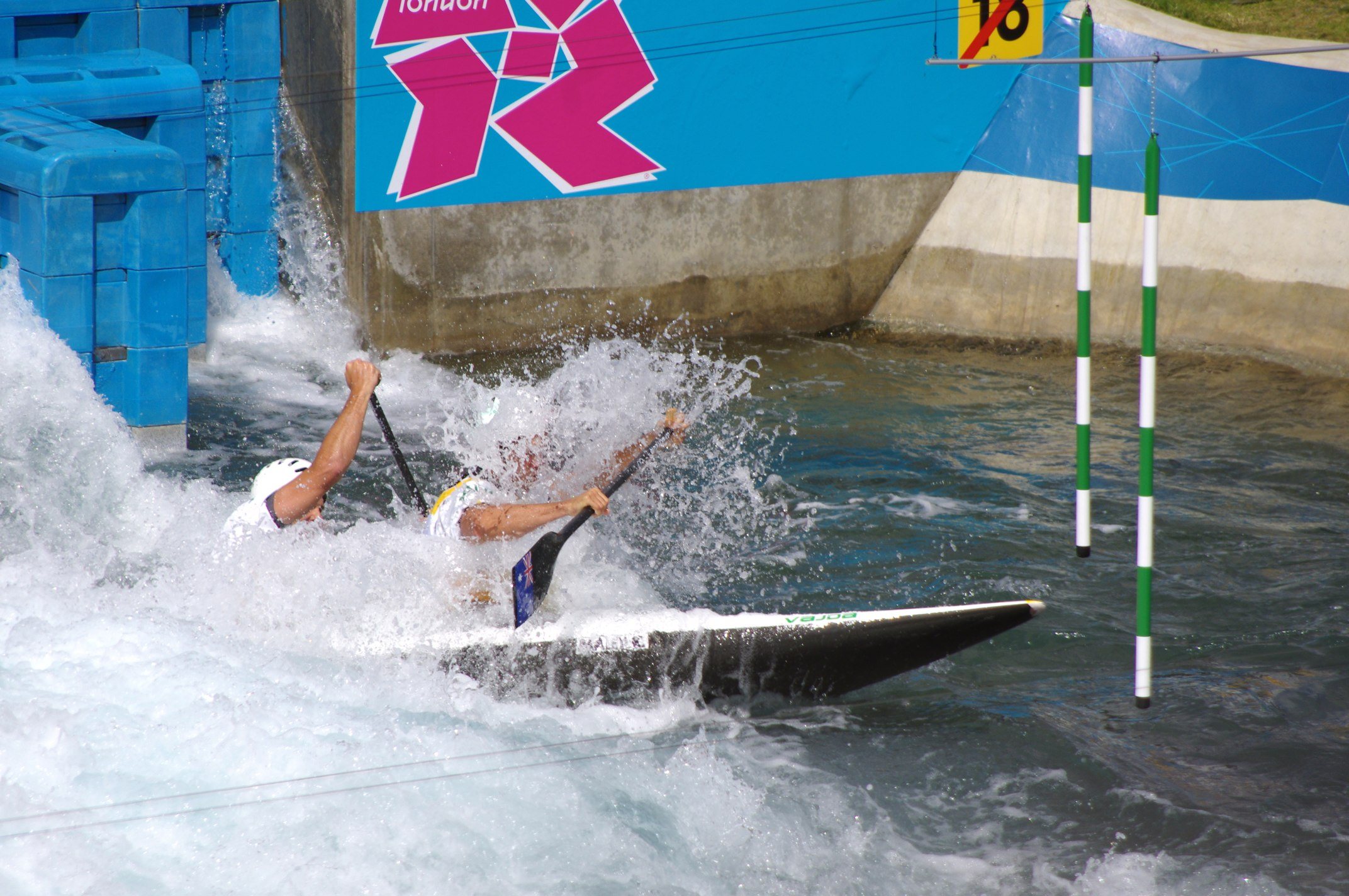
Kynan Maley & Robin Jeffery
