= Amir Mohammad Fattahpour =

Iranian slalom canoeist

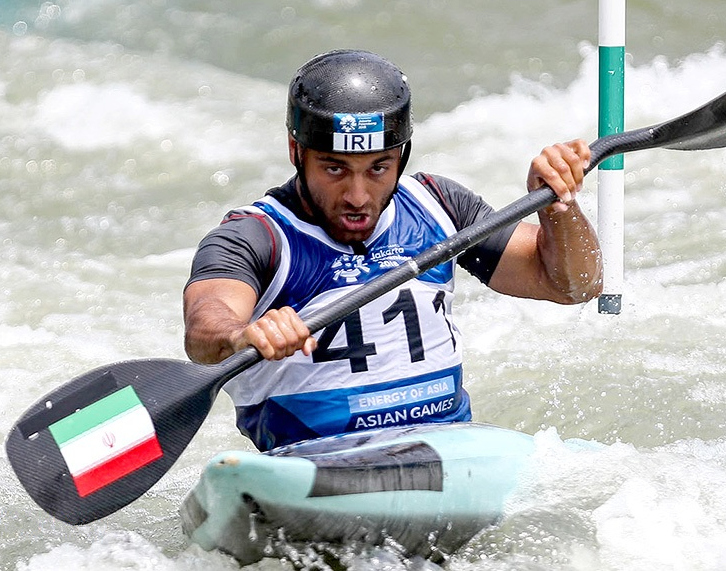
- Fattahpour at the 2018 Asian Games

Personal information
- Born: 14 May 1993 (age 33)
- Education: Razi University

Sport
- Sport: Canoe slalom
Medal record
Men's canoe slalom
Representing Iran
Asian Canoeing Championships
| Bronze medal – third place | 2010 Xiasi | C2 |
| Bronze medal – third place | 2017 Nakhon Nayok | C1 team |

Amir Mohammad Fattahpour (born 14 May 1993) is an Iranian slalom canoeist. He competed at the 2010, 2014 and 2018 Asian Games, with the best result of fifth place in the K-1 event in 2018, and won bronze medals at the 2010 and 2017 Asian Championships.
