= 2000 Asian Canoe Slalom Championships =

Canoeing competition in Changzhou, China

- Host city: Changzhou, China
- Dates: 4–7 November 2000

The 2000 Asian Canoe Slalom Championships were the 1st Asian Canoe Slalom Championships and took place from November 4–7, 2000 in China.

== Medal summary ==
Event	Gold	Silver	Bronze
Men's C-1	Han Jiaqiang; China	Zhi Xianzhi; China	Naoki Yagi; Japan
Men's C-2	China; Zhang Lei; Mo Bin	China; Yang Jieliang; Li Lei	Japan; Masatoshi Sanma; Daiki Ichiba
Men's K-1	Shu Yong; China	Lin Yanwen; China	Lin Xiongyi; China

== Medal table ==
Rank	Nation	Gold	Silver	Bronze	Total
1	China	3	3	1	7
2	Japan	0	0	2	2
Totals (2 entries)		3	3	3	9
