= Robin Jeffery =

Australian canoeist

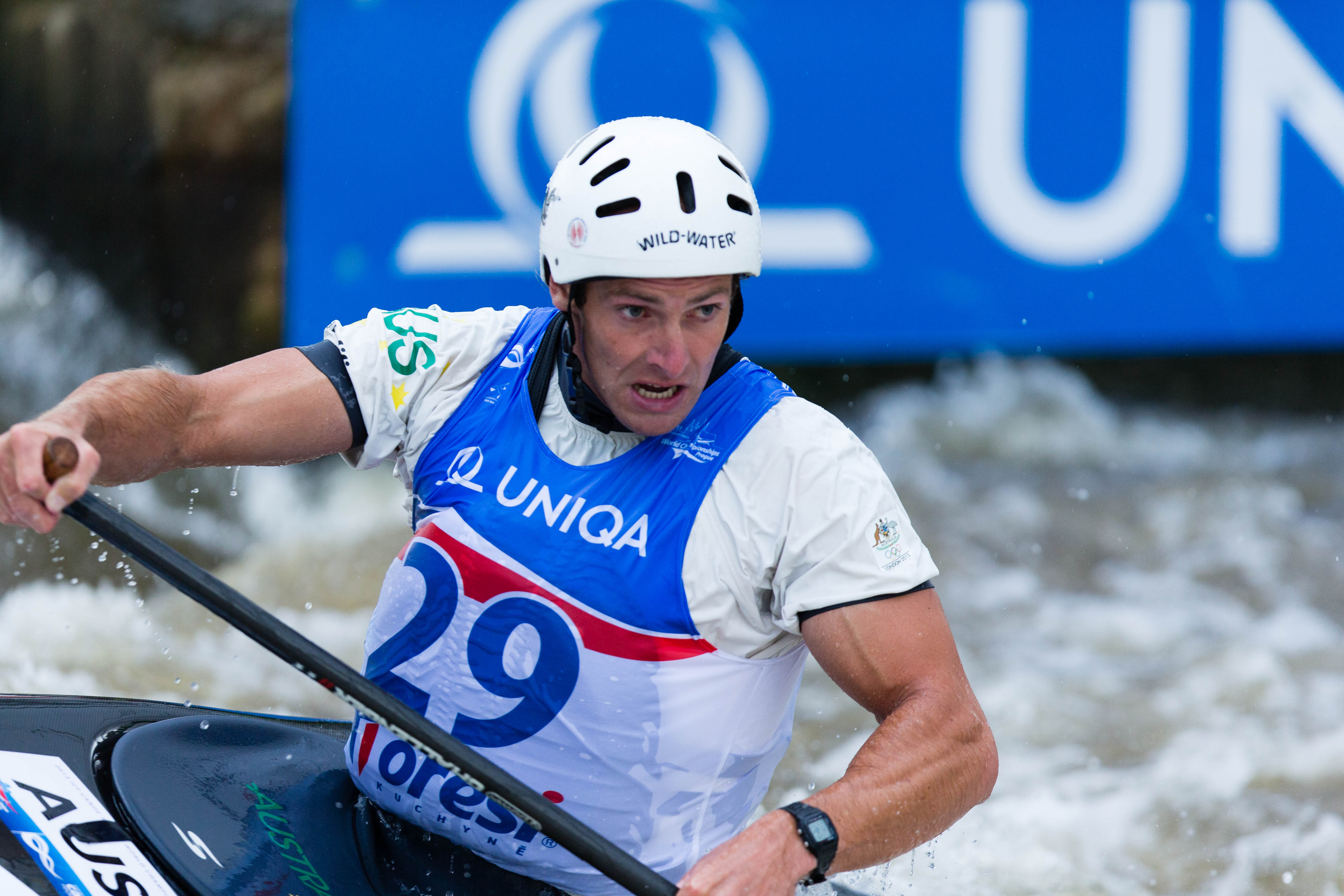

Robin Jeffery (born 25 August 1987 in Johannesburg, South Africa) is an Australian slalom canoeist. At the 2012 Summer Olympics he competed in the C-2 event. He partnered Kynan Maley, finishing in 10th place after being eliminated in the semifinals.

Now residing in New South Wales, Jeffery was the most consistent performer among his C1 peers. He reached the semi-finals at three of the four World Cups he raced at during 2016.
