= Chen Shi (canoeist) =

Chinese kayaker (born 1988)

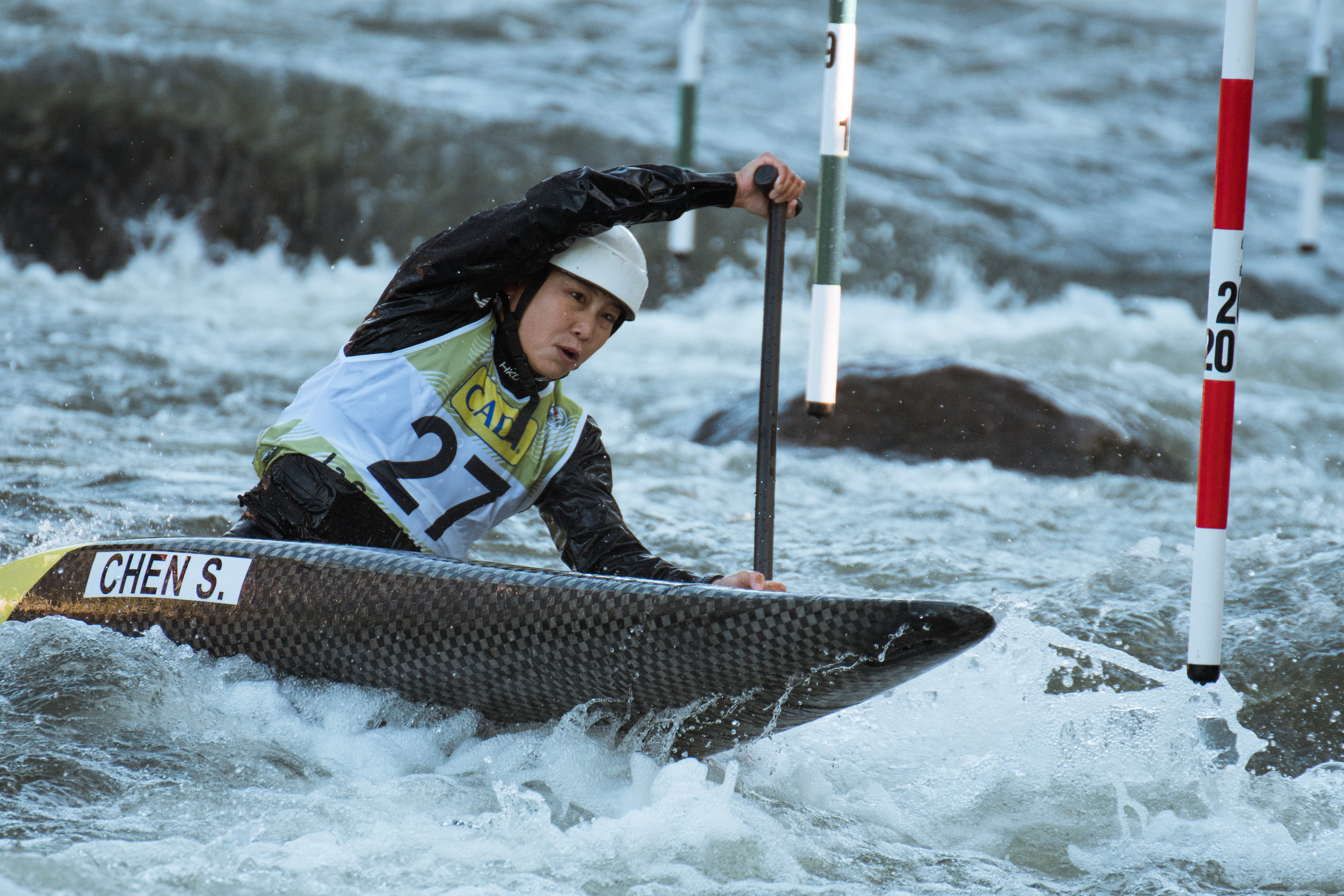
- Chen at the 2019 ICF Canoe Slalom World Championships

Personal information
- Nationality: Chinese
- Born: 6 July 1993
- Height: 163 cm (5 ft 4 in)
- Weight: 58 kg (128 lb)

Sport
- Country: China
- Sport: Canoe slalom
- Event: C1, K1, Mixed C2
- Coached by: Zhang Bo & Peng Chun
Medal record
Women's canoe slalom
Representing China
Asian Games
Gold medal – first place	2018 Jakarta	C1
Asian Canoeing Championships
Gold medal – first place	2017 Nakhon Nayok	C1
Gold medal – first place	2017 Nakhon Nayok	C1 team

Chen Shi (Chinese: 陈诗; pinyin: Chén Shī; born 6 July 1993) is a Chinese slalom canoeist who has competed at the international level since 2009. She is from Liaoning in north-east China. Shi mainly competes in C1, but has also competed in mixed C2 with Shu Jianming.

She won a gold medal in the C1 event at the 2018 Asian Games near Jakarta, and two gold medals at the 2017 Asian Canoe Slalom Championships in Nakhon Nayok. Shi's best senior world championship results are 19th (C1: 2018), 45th (K1: 2009) and 7th (Mixed C2: 2017).

Chen competed in the C1 event at the 2020 Summer Olympics in Tokyo, after China secured a quota place at the 2021 Asian Canoe Slalom Olympic Qualifiers in Pattaya. She finished in 17th place after being eliminated in the semifinal.
