= 2005 National Games of China =

Sporting event

10th National Games of the People's Republic of China
- Host city: Nanjing, Jiangsu
- Country: China
- Teams: 42
- Athletes: 9986 (5483 men, 4503 women)
- Events: 46
- Opening: 12 October 2005
- Closing: 23 October 2005
- Opened by: Hu Jintao (CCP general secretary and Chinese president)
- Closed by: Wen Jiabao (Premier)
- Main venue: Nanjing Olympic Sports Center

The 10th National Games of the People's Republic of China was a multi-sport event that was held in Nanjing City, Jiangsu Province, from 12–23 October 2005. This was the first time the National Games was hosted by a province outside of Beijing, Shanghai, and Guangdong, which had hosted the games on a rotational basis.

As a premier national sporting event, the 10th National Games of the People's Republic of China aimed to identify and nurture athlete talents and build up the national teams for the 2008 Olympic Games in Beijing.

== Participation ==
The Games featured a total of 47 participating teams from: Chinese People's Liberation Army, Beijing Municipality, Tianjin City, Hebei Province, Shanxi Province, Inner Mongolia Autonomous Region, Liaoning Province, Jilin Province, Heilongjiang Province, Shanghai City, Jiangsu Province, Zhejiang Province, Anhui Province, Fujian Province, Jiangxi Province, Shandong Province, Henan Province, Hubei Province, Hunan Province, Guangdong Province, Zhuang Autonomous Region of Guangxi, Hainan Province, Chongqing City, Sichuan Province, Guizhou Province, Yunnan Province, Tibet Autonomous Region, Shaanxi Province, Gansu Province, Qinghai Province, Hui Autonomous Region of Ningxia, Uygur Autonomous Region of Xinjiang, Taiwan Province, the Macau Special Administrative Region, the Hong Kong Special Administrative Region and sports associations across the country.

== Sports ==
There were a total of 32 events at the 10th National Games.

- Aquatics
  - Diving
  - Swimming
  - Synchronized swimming
  - Water polo
- Archery
- Athletics
- Badminton
- Baseball
- Basketball
- Boxing
- Canoeing
- Cycling
- Equestrian
- Fencing
- Football
- Gymnastics
  - Artistic gymnastics
  - Rhythmic gymnastics
  - Trampoline gymnastics
- Handball
- Hockey
- Judo
- Modern pentathlon
- Rowing
- Shooting
- Skating
  - Figure skating
  - Short speed skating
  - Long speed skating
- Softball
- Table tennis
- Taekwondo
- Tennis
- Triathlon
- Volleyball
- Beach volleyball
- Weightlifting
- Wrestling
- Wushu
- Yachting

== Medal table ==
Rank	Delegation	Gold	Silver	Bronze	Total
1	Jiangsu	56	38	42	136
2	Guangdong	46	42.5	36.5	125
3	PLA*	44	39	32	115
4	Shandong	42	29	27	98
5	Beijing	32	23.5	26	81.5
6	Liaoning	31	35	33	99
7	Zhejiang	29	20	12	61
8	Shanghai	26	48	44.5	118.5
9	Fujian	17	12	14	43
10	Heilongjiang	16	17	8.5	41.5
11	Tianjin	15.5	13.5	11	40
12	Henan	15.5	7	18.5	41
13	Hebei	15	9	11	35
14	Hunan	13	12	8	33
15	Sichuan	12	17	19	48
16	Jiangxi	12	6	2	20
17	Jilin	10	17	11.5	38.5
18	Shanxi	10	5	5	20
19	Anhui	7	5	7	19
20	Hubei	7	4.5	8	19.5
21	Guangxi	6	8	8	22
22	Yunnan	5.5	8	8.5	22
23	Shaanxi	3	7.5	8.5	19
24	Gansu	2	4	1	7
25	Locomotive*	2	1	1	4
26	Xinjiang	1.5	2.5	6.5	10.5
27	Inner Mongolia	1	4.5	10	15.5
28	Chongqing	1	3	0.5	4.5
29	Individual*	1	2	2	5
30	Hainan	1	1	4	6
31	Guizhou	1	0.5	3.5	5
32	Hong Kong	1	0	3	4
33	Qianwei*	1	0	2	3
34	Xinjiang PCG*	0	1	0.5	1.5
35	Coal*	0	1	0	1
36	Ningxia	0	0.5	1.5	2
37	Qinghai	0	0	2	2
38	Communication*	0	0	1	1
Totals (38 entries)		483	444.5	440	1,367.5

Notes

1. Teams with * are not province teams but other trades & organizations.
2. Medals of athletes of every team received in 2004 Olympics and 2002 Winter Olympics are taken into the medal count of that team.
