= 2004 Canoe Slalom World Cup Race 1 – Men's K-1 =

The 2004 Canoe Slalom World Cup Race 1 - Men's K-1 was a Canoe Slalom race in Athens.

== Men’s K1 Kayak Single ==
=== Results List - Heats - 1st and 2nd Run ===
Rk	Athlete	1st Run				2nd Run				Total	
Rk	Athlete	Time	Pen. Sec.	Total Time	Rk	Time	Pen. Sec.	Total Time	Rk	Time	Behind
1	Benoît Peschier (FRA)	94.61	0	94.61	4	93.11	0	93.11	3	187.72	0.00
2	Campbell Walsh (GBR)	91.29	2	93.29	1	94.64	0	94.64	3	187.93	0.21
3	Helmut Oblinger (AUT)	95.81	0	95.81	10	92.76	0	92.76	1	188.57	0.85
4	Paul Ratcliffe (GBR)	94.25	0	94.25	2	94.45	0	94.45	6	188.70	0.98
5	Peter Cibák (SVK)	93.76	4	97.76	19	92.81	0	92.81	2	190.57	2.85
6	Carles Juanmartí (ESP)	96.02	0	96.02	11	95.08	0	95.08	8	191.10	3.38
7	Fedja Marušič (SLO)	95.69	2	97.69	18	91.42	4	93.42	8	191.11	3.39
8	Michael Kurt (SUI)	95.61	0	95.61	7	96.40	0	96.40	15	192.01	4.29
9	Stefano Cipressi (ITA)	95.63	0	95.63	8	95.02	2	97.02	16	192.65	4.93
10	Dejan Kralj (SLO)	92.65	4	96.65	12	94.27	2	96.27	14	192.92	5.20
11	Ondřej Raab (CZE)	95.56	2	97.56	17	95.65	0	95.65	10	193.21	5.49
12	Julien Billaut (FRA)	95.75	0	95.75	9	96.37	2	98.37	26	194.12	6.40
13	David Backhouse (NED)	93.08	4	97.08	13	97.71	0	97.71	20	194.79	7.07
14	Brett Heyl (USA)	94.47	0	94.47	3	98.53	2	100.53	37	195.00	7.28
15	Warwick Draper (AUS)	95.74	4	99.74	31	95.36	0	95.36	9	195.10	7.38
16	Dinko Mulić (CRO)	97.39	0	97.39	15	97.91	0	97.91	23	195.30	7.58
17	Andrej Glucks (CRO)	97.96	0	97.96	25	97.66	0	97.66	18	195.62	7.90
18	Herwig Natmessnig (AUT)	95.26	0	95.26	6	99.03	2	101.03	40	196.29	8.57
19	Scott Parsons (USA)	96.90	4	100.90	37	92.17	4	96.17	13	197.07	9.35
20	Floris Braat (NED)	101.23	0	101.23	38	96.08	0	96.08	11	197.31	9.59
21	Thomas Schmidt (GER)	97.86	2	99.86	32	93.68	4	97.68	19	197.54	9.82
22	Fabien Lefèvre (FRA)	98.05	0	98.05	26	95.71	4	99.71	32	197.76	10.04
23	Luca Costa (ITA)	95.78	2	97.78	20	100.29	0	100.29	35	198.07	10.35
24	Dariusz Popiela (POL)	98.37	0	98.37	27	95.91	4	99.91	34	198.28	10.56
25	Uroš Kodelja (SLO)	94.63	0	94.63	5	103.80	0	103.80	57	198.43	10.71
26	Eoin Rheinisch (IRL)	100.41	4	104.41	52	94.08	0	94.08	5	198.49	10.77
27	Mathias Röthenmund (SUI)	98.54	0	98.54	28	100.31	0	100.31	36	198.85	11.13
28	Grzegorz Polaczyk (POL)	97.95	0	97.95	24	97.19	4	101.19	42	199.14	11.42
29	Benjamin Boukpeti (TOG)	101.54	0	101.54	40	95.74	2	97.74	21	199.28	11.56
30	Pablo McCandless (CHI)	93.11	4	97.11	14	100.30	2	102.30	49	199.41	11.69
31	Alexander Eplinger (AUT)	98.60	0	98.60	29	100.94	0	100.94	39	199.54	11.82
32	Aidan Rheinisch (IRL)	95.93	2	97.93	23	101.64	0	101.64	45	199.57	11.85
33	Shumpei Sato (JPN)	97.53	0	97.53	16	102.27	0	102.27	48	199.80	12.08
34	Thomas Mosimann (SUI)	101.88	0	101.88	43	98.02	0	98.02	24	199.90	12.18
35	John Wilkie (AUS)	100.72	0	100.72	35	99.43	0	99.43	30	200.15	12.43
36	Jens Ewald (GER)	101.39	0	101.39	39	97.64	2	99.64	31	201.03	13.31
37	Radoslav Orokocký (SVK)	99.99	2	101.99	44	99.08	0	99.08	28	201.07	13.35
38	David Ford (CAN)	102.22	2	104.22	50	95.30	2	97.30	17	201.52	13.80
39	Guillermo Díez-Canedo (ESP)	103.42	2	105.42	57	96.16	0	96.16	12	201.58	13.86
40	Neil Caffrey (IRL)	103.05	0	103.05	46	98.72	0	98.72	27	201.77	14.05
41	Stanislav Zhivodrov (RUS)	100.64	0	100.64	34	97.69	4	101.69	46	202.33	14.61
42	Jared Meehan (NZL)	97.92	0	97.92	22	102.82	2	104.82	59	202.74	15.02
43	Huw Swetnam (GBR)	100.05	0	100.05	33	96.75	6	102.75	52	202.80	15.08
44	Lukáš Kubričan (CZE)	96.83	4	100.83	36	100.23	2	102.23	47	203.06	15.34
45	Marten Hellberg (SWE)	99.98	4	103.98	49	93.11	6	99.11	29	203.09	15.37
46	Pierre Levesque (CAN)	99.16	4	103.16	47	100.90	0	100.90	38	204.06	16.34
47	Ivan Pišvejc (CZE)	97.76	4	101.76	41	102.04	2	104.04	58	205.80	18.08
48	Mikhail Ageenko (RUS)	101.02	4	105.02	54	99.08	2	101.08	41	206.10	18.38
49	Sam Oud (NED)	95.78	2	97.78	20	106.58	2	108.58	66	206.36	18.64
50	Tsubasa Sasaki (JPN)	99.78	2	101.78	42	99.82	6	105.82	63	207.60	19.88
51	Scott Shipley (USA)	100.22	4	104.22	50	97.49	6	103.49	55	207.71	19.99
52	Fabian Dörfler (GER)	97.18	2	99.18	30	105.96	4	109.96	70	209.14	21.42
53	Mendiola E. Arakama (ESP)	109.79	0	109.79	59	99.45	2	101.45	44	211.24	23.52
54	Shuji Yamanaka (JPN)	112.70	2	114.70	65	97.90	0	97.90	22	212.60	24.88
55	Emir Sarganović (BIH)	106.30	4	110.30	60	103.62	0	103.62	56	213.92	26.20
56	Boris Dujmić (CRO)	101.29	4	105.29	55	103.32	6	109.32	68	214.61	26.89
57	Alexandros Dimitriou (GRE)	102.77	0	102.77	45	107.90	4	111.90	73	214.67	26.95
58	Alexander Chigidin (RUS)	104.64	0	104.64	53	108.98	2	110.98	71	215.62	27.90
59	Lazar Popovski (MKD)	109.13	4	113.13	63	100.62	2	102.62	50	215.75	28.03
60	Atanas Nikolovski (MKD)	104.26	2	106.26	58	105.83	4	109.83	69	216.09	28.37
61	Miroslav Damborský (SVK)	103.40	2	105.40	56	110.15	2	112.15	74	217.55	29.83
62	Robert Parker (AUS)	114.94	2	116.94	69	102.71	0	102.71	51	219.65	31.93
63	Gustavo Selbach (BRA)	106.71	8	114.71	66	101.24	4	105.24	61	219.95	32.23
64	Hermann Husslein (THA)	105.90	6	111.90	62	108.33	0	108.33	65	220.23	32.51
65	Ben Walkley (NZL)	115.39	2	117.39	70	103.40	0	103.40	54	220.79	33.07
66	Erik Ahlmark (SWE)	112.75	6	118.75	71	99.15	4	103.15	53	221.90	34.18
67	Yanwen Lin (CHN)	111.82	2	113.82	64	104.12	4	108.12	64	221.94	34.22
68	Johann Roozenburg (NZL)	101.43	2	103.43	48	116.35	4	120.35	78	223.78	36.06
69	Daniele Molmenti (ITA)	120.40	4	124.40	74	95.90	4	99.90	33	224.30	36.58
70	Cameron McIntosh (RSA)	109.29	6	115.29	68	107.48	4	111.48	72	226.77	39.05
71	Roger Madrigal (CRC)	117.25	4	121.25	73	103.66	2	105.66	62	226.91	39.19
72	Ola Benemark (SWE)	105.05	10	115.05	67	111.32	4	115.32	76	230.37	42.65
73	Alexandros Nikolopoulos (GRE)	107.48	4	111.48	61	111.68	8	119.68	77	231.16	43.44
74	Nizar Samlal (MAR)	114.30	6	120.30	72	114.91	6	120.91	79	241.21	53.49
75	Oleksandr Malovanyy (UKR)	126.72	10	136.72	77	106.63	2	108.63	67	245.35	57.63
76	Mike Holroyd (CAN)	104.98	52	156.98	82	94.13	4	98.13	25	255.11	67.39
77	Zhixiang Chen (CHN)	137.11	4	141.11	80	112.67	2	114.67	75	255.78	68.06
78	Machado J. V. Martins (BRA)	128.89	4	132.89	76	121.37	4	125.37	80	258.26	70.54
79	Andres Sierra (MEX)	128.69	10	138.69	79	133.29	6	139.29	86	277.98	90.26
80	Giannopoulos Athanasios (GRE)	143.00	10	153.00	81	129.79	6	135.79	84	288.79	101.07
81	Igor Kuzmanović (BIH)	149.27	14	163.27	84	131.02	4	135.02	83	298.29	110.57
82	Olivier Machiels (BEL)	124.59	50	174.59	86	122.35	4	126.35	81	300.94	113.22
83	Ding Fuxue (CHN)	145.19	56	201.19	88	99.33	2	101.33	43	302.52	114.80
84	Dmytro Prokopenko (UKR)	126.96	10	136.96	78	114.27	52	166.27	91	303.23	115.51
85	Gaspar Goncz (HUN)	147.35	12	159.35	83	150.75	10	160.75	90	320.10	132.38
86	Tuminauskas Arunas (LTU)	153.37	10	163.37	85	147.92	10	157.92	87	321.29	133.57
87	Milan Pavlović (SCG)	137.97	60	197.97	87	131.35	6	137.35	85	335.32	147.60
88	Juan Antonio De Ugarte (PER)	117.97	10	127.97	75	158.24	58	216.24	95	344.21	156.49
89	Viseur Venceslas (BEL)	103.38	152	255.38	92	103.07	2	105.07	60	360.45	172.73
90	Chen Yaen-Ting (TPE)	145.11	60	205.11	90	150.47	8	158.47	88	363.58	175.86
91	Karim Ouazaa (TUN)	149.77	62	211.77	91	144.70	16	160.70	89	372.47	184.75
92	Christophe Putzeys (BEL)	144.04	58	202.04	89	119.99	60	179.99	92	382.03	194.31
93	Yavuz Aksakal (TUR)	153.44	112	265.44	93	144.84	66	210.84	94	476.28	288.56
94	Roman Zidrashco (MDA)	173.59	114	287.59	94	160.15	114	274.15	97	561.74	374.02
95	Aleksey Naumkin (UZB)	155.60	354	509.60	99	125.17	4	129.17	82	638.77	451.05
96	Yuriy Konarev (KAZ)	201.86	216	417.86	96	200.14	118	318.14	98	736.00	548.28
97	Chingbaohom Khomson (LAO)	206.84	306	512.84	100	172.32	60	232.32	96	745.16	557.44
98	Adrian Rossi (ARG)	171.34	264	435.34	97	148.04	206	354.04	99	789.38	601.66
99	Lucian Cioara (ROM)	194.13	266	460.13	98	211.18	262	473.18	103	933.31	745.59
100	Nikola Stanković (BIH)	179.33	408	587.33	101	211.12	218	429.12	100	1016.45	828.73
101	Kay Lau Kam (HKG)	200.07	410	610.07	102	188.02	460	648.02	104	1258.09	1070.37
102	Hap Leung Kwan (HKG)	175.93	462	637.93	103	224.36	454	678.36	102	1316.29	1128.57
103	Palacios F. A. Alvarez (COL)			DNF		171.44	14	185.44	93		
104	Dan Ardelean (ROM)	188.18	114	302.18	95			DNF			
105	Toppo Karma (IND)			DNF		175.34	408	583.34	101		
106	Ali Dandach (LIB)			DNF		127.69	704	831.69	105		
	Felix Aguanta (BOL)			DNF				DNF			
	Alex Olguin (CHI)			DNS				DNS			
	Kong Keng Cheung (HKG)			DNF				DNF			
	Coblai Serghei (MDA)			DNF				DSQ-R			

=== Results List - Semi Final ===
Rk	Athlete	Time	Pen. Sec.	Total Time	Behind
1	Fabien Lefèvre (FRA)	93.89	0	93.89	0.00
2	Scott Parsons (USA)	94.57	0	94.57	0.68
3	Benoît Peschier (FRA)	95.57	0	95.57	1.68
4	Campbell Walsh (GBR)	95.66	0	95.66	1.77
5	Thomas Schmidt (GER)	95.76	0	95.76	1.87
6	Julien Billaut (FRA)	95.77	0	95.77	1.88
7	Dariusz Popiela (POL)	96.76	0	96.76	2.87
8	Helmut Oblinger (AUT)	96.79	0	96.79	2.90
9	Brett Heyl (USA)	96.89	0	96.89	3.00
10	Ondřej Raab (CZE)	97.28	0	97.28	3.39
11	Dejan Kralj (SLO)	99.00	0	99.00	5.11
12	Floris Braat (NED)	99.03	0	99.03	5.14
13	Uroš Kodelja (SLO)	98.39	2	100.39	6.50
14	Warwick Draper (AUS)	101.29	0	101.29	7.40
15	Carles Juanmartí (ESP)	99.30	2	101.30	7.41
16	Neil Caffrey (IRL)	99.47	2	101.47	7.58
17	Dinko Mulić (CRO)	101.74	0	101.74	7.85
18	David Backhouse (NED)	102.21	0	102.21	8.32
19	Fedja Marušič (SLO)	98.93	4	102.93	9.04
20	Eoin Rheinisch (IRL)	104.28	0	104.28	10.39
21	Michael Kurt (SUI)	104.34	0	104.34	10.45
22	Grzegorz Polaczyk (POL)	102.66	2	104.66	10.77
23	John Wilkie (AUS)	100.78	4	104.78	10.89
24	Stefano Cipressi (ITA)	102.82	2	104.82	10.93
25	Herwig Natmessnig (AUT)	105.30	0	105.30	11.41
26	Pablo Mccandless (CHI)	103.99	2	105.99	12.10
27	Jens Ewald (GER)	102.44	4	106.44	12.55
28	Benjamin Boukpeti (TOG)	107.68	0	107.68	13.79
29	Radoslav Orokocký (SVK)	103.74	6	109.74	15.85
30	David Ford (CAN)	113.06	0	113.06	19.17
31	Mathias Röthenmund (SUI)	111.45	2	113.45	19.56
32	Thomas Mosimann (SUI)	112.45	2	114.45	20.56
33	Aidan Rheinisch (IRL)	115.34	0	115.34	21.45
34	Guillermo Díez-Canedo (ESP)	116.49	0	116.49	22.60
35	Andrej Glucks (CRO)	116.78	0	116.78	22.89
36	Shumpei Sato (JPN)	113.69	6	119.69	25.80
37	Paul Ratcliffe (GBR)	96.69	52	148.69	54.80
38	Peter Cibák (SVK)	101.53	50	151.53	57.64
39	Alexander Eplinger (AUT)	106.61	52	158.61	64.72
40	Luca Costa (ITA)	118.55	100	218.55	124.66

=== Results List - SemiFinal and Final ===
Rk	Athlete	Semifinal				Final				Total	
Rk	Athlete	Time	Pen. Sec.	Total Time	Rk	Time	Pen. Sec.	Total Time	Rk	Time	Behind
1	Fabien Lefèvre (FRA)	93.89	0	93.89	1	93.08	0	93.08	1	186.97	0.00
2	Campbell Walsh (GBR)	95.66	0	95.66	4	94.40	0	94.40	2	190.06	3.09
3	Helmut Oblinger (AUT)	96.79	0	96.79	8	94.90	0	94.90	3	191.69	4.72
4	Benoît Peschier (FRA)	95.57	0	95.57	3	96.38	0	96.38	4	191.95	4.98
5	Scott Parsons (USA)	94.57	0	94.57	2	96.40	2	98.40	7	192.97	6.00
6	Julien Billaut (FRA)	95.77	0	95.77	6	95.21	2	97.21	6	192.98	6.01
7	Ondřej Raab (CZE)	97.28	0	97.28	10	96.45	0	96.45	5	193.73	6.76
8	Brett Heyl (USA)	96.89	0	96.89	9	96.54	2	98.54	8	195.43	8.46
9	Dariusz Popiela (POL)	96.76	0	96.76	7	96.97	2	98.97	9	195.73	8.76
10	Thomas Schmidt (GER)	95.76	0	95.76	5	104.63	0	104.63	10	200.39	13.42
