= Canoeing at the 2008 Summer Olympics =

Canoeing at the Games of the XXIX Olympiad
- Venue: Shunyi Olympic Rowing-Canoeing Park
- Dates: August 11–23, 2008
- Competitors: 128

Canoeing at the 2008 Summer Olympics in Beijing was held from August 11 to 23 at the Shunyi Olympic Rowing-Canoeing Park.

Peter Hochschorner and Pavol Hochschorner from Slovakia became the first slalom canoeists to win three Olympic gold medals.

== Medal summary ==
=== By event ===
==== Slalom ====
Games	Gold	Silver	Bronze
Men's C-1	Michal Martikán; Slovakia	David Florence; Great Britain	Robin Bell; Australia
Men's C-2	Pavol Hochschorner and Peter Hochschorner; Slovakia	Ondřej Štěpánek and Jaroslav Volf; Czech Republic	Mikhail Kuznetsov and Dmitry Larionov; Russia
Men's K-1	Alexander Grimm; Germany	Fabien Lefèvre; France	Benjamin Boukpeti; Togo
Women's K-1	Elena Kaliská; Slovakia	Jacqueline Lawrence; Australia	Violetta Oblinger-Peters; Austria

==== Sprint ====
Men

Games	Gold	Silver	Bronze
C-1 500 metres	Maxim Opalev; Russia	David Cal; Spain	Iurii Cheban; Ukraine
C-1 1000 metres	Attila Vajda; Hungary	David Cal; Spain	Thomas Hall; Canada
C-2 500 metres	Meng Guanliang and Yang Wenjun; China	Alexander Kostoglod and Sergey Ulegin; Russia	Christian Gille and Thomasz Wylenzek; Germany
C-2 1000 metres	Aliaksandr Bahdanovich and Andrei Bahdanovich; Belarus	Christian Gille and Tomasz Wylenzek; Germany	György Kozmann and Tamás Kiss; Hungary
K-1 500 metres	Ken Wallace; Australia	Adam van Koeverden; Canada	Tim Brabants; Great Britain
K-1 1000 metres	Tim Brabants; Great Britain	Eirik Verås Larsen; Norway	Ken Wallace; Australia
K-2 500 metres	Saúl Craviotto and Carlos Pérez; Spain	Ronald Rauhe and Tim Wieskötter; Germany	Raman Piatrushenka and Vadzim Makhneu; Belarus
K-2 1000 metres	Andreas Ihle and Martin Hollstein; Germany	Kim Wraae Knudsen and René Holten Poulsen; Denmark	Andrea Facchin and Antonio Scaduto; Italy
K-4 1000 metres	Belarus; Raman Piatrushenka; Aliaksei Abalmasau; Artur Litvinchuk; Vadzim Makhneu	Slovakia; Richard Riszdorfer; Michal Riszdorfer; Erik Vlček; Juraj Tarr	Germany; Lutz Altepost; Norman Bröckl; Torsten Eckbrett; Bjorn Hogel Goldschmidt

Women

Games	Gold	Silver	Bronze
K-1 500 metres	Inna Osypenko; Ukraine	Josefa Idem; Italy	Katrin Wagner-Augustin; Germany
K-2 500 metres	Katalin Kovács and Natasa Janics; Hungary	Beata Mikołajczyk and Aneta Konieczna; Poland	Marie Delattre and Anne-Laure Viard; France
K-4 500 metres	Germany; Fanny Fischer; Nicole Reinhardt; Katrin Wagner-Augustin; Conny Waßmuth	Hungary; Katalin Kovács; Gabriella Szabó; Danuta Kozák; Nataša Janić	Australia; Lisa Oldenhof; Hannah Davis; Chantal Meek; Lyndsie Fogarty

=== By nation ===
Rank	Nation	Gold	Silver	Bronze	Total
1	Germany	3	2	3	8
2	Slovakia	3	1	0	4
3	Hungary	2	1	1	4
4	Belarus	2	0	1	3
5	Spain	1	2	0	3
6	Australia	1	1	3	5
7	Great Britain	1	1	1	3
7	Russia	1	1	1	3
9	Ukraine	1	0	1	2
10	China	1	0	0	1
11	Canada	0	1	1	2
11	France	0	1	1	2
11	Italy	0	1	1	2
14	Czech Republic	0	1	0	1
14	Denmark	0	1	0	1
14	Norway	0	1	0	1
14	Poland	0	1	0	1
18	Austria	0	0	1	1
18	Togo	0	0	1	1
Totals (19 entries)		16	16	16	48
