= Slovakia at the 2008 Summer Olympics =

- IOC code: SVK
- NOC: Slovak Olympic and Sports Committee
- Website: www.olympic.sk (in Slovak)

in Beijing
- Competitors: 58 in 14 sports
- Flag bearers: Elena Kaliská (opening); Michal Riszdorfer (closing)
- Medals Ranked 26th: Gold 3 Silver 3 Bronze 0 Total 6

Summer Olympics appearances (overview)
- 1996; 2000; 2004; 2008; 2012; 2016; 2020; 2024

Other related appearances
- Hungary (1896–1912); Czechoslovakia (1924–1992)

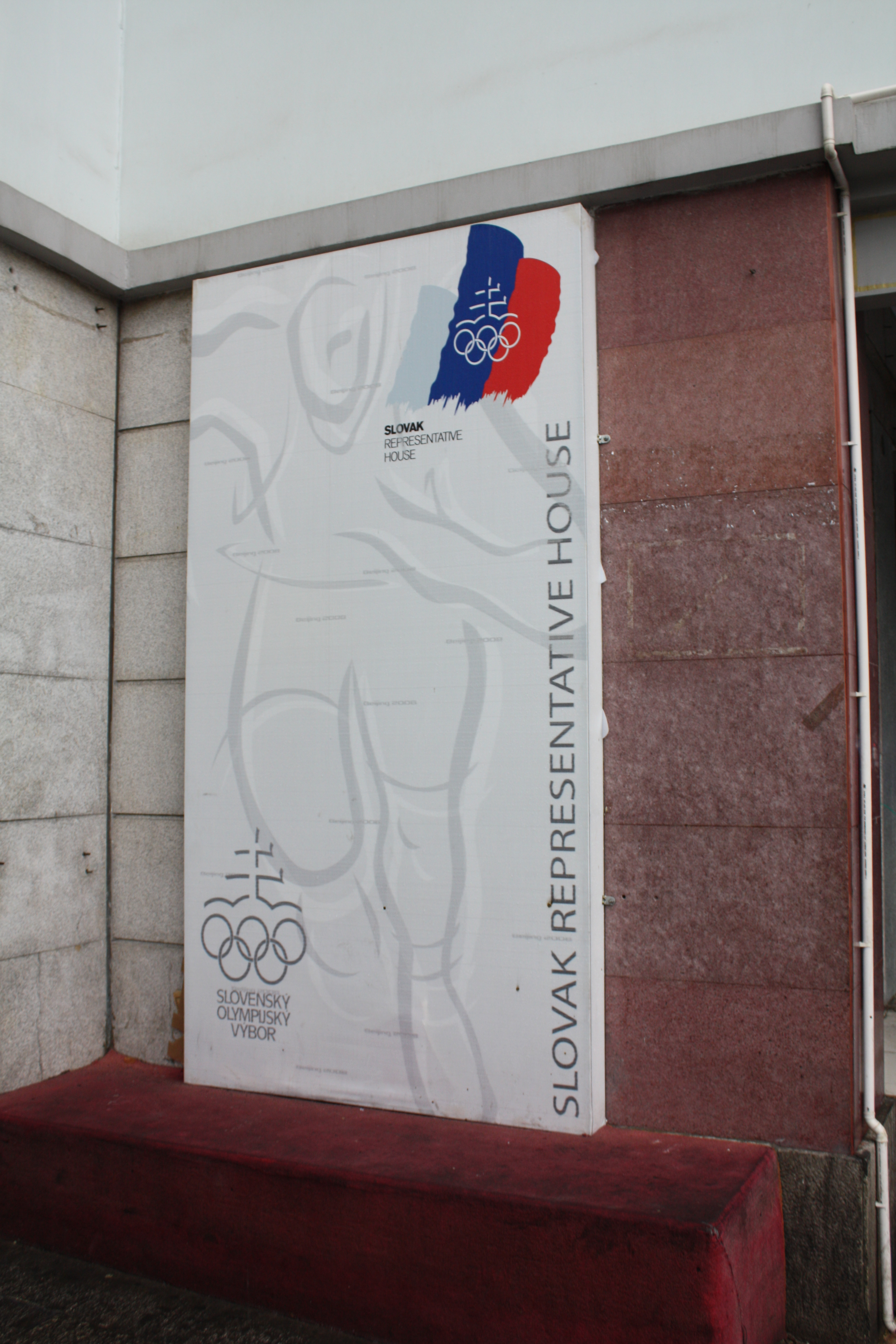
Slovak representative house in Beijing

Slovakia competed at the 2008 Summer Olympics in Beijing, People's Republic of China. The team includes 57 athletes in several sports.

== Medalists ==
Medal	Name	Sport	Event
Gold	Michal Martikán	Canoeing	Men's C-1
Gold	Elena Kaliská	Canoeing	Women's K-1
Gold	Pavol Hochschorner; Peter Hochschorner	Canoeing	Men's C-2
Silver	Zuzana Štefečeková	Shooting	Women's trap
Silver	Michal Riszdorfer; Richard Riszdorfer; Juraj Tarr; Erik Vlček	Canoeing	Men's K-4 1000 m
Silver	David Musuľbes	Wrestling	Men's freestyle 120 kg

== Athletics ==
Key

- Note–Ranks given for track events are within the athlete's heat only
- Q = Qualified for the next round
- q = Qualified for the next round as a fastest loser or, in field events, by position without achieving the qualifying target
- NR = National record
- N/A = Round not applicable for the event
- Bye = Athlete not required to compete in round

Men
Track & road events

Athlete	Event	Heat		Semifinal		Final	
Athlete	Event	Result	Rank	Result	Rank	Result	Rank
Miloš Bátovský	50 km walk	—				4:06:30	35
Peter Korčok	50 km walk	—				DNF	
Jozef Repčík	800 m	1:48.64	5	Did not advance			
Matej Tóth	20 km walk	—				1:23:17	26
Kazimír Verkin	50 km walk	—				4:21:26	47

Field events

Athlete	Event	Qualification		Final	
Athlete	Event	Distance	Position	Distance	Position
Libor Charfreitag	Hammer throw	76.61	10 q	78.65	8
Milan Haborák	Shot put	19.32	30	Did not advance	
Peter Horák	High jump	2.15	34	Did not advance	
Miloslav Konopka	Hammer throw	71.96	23	Did not advance	
Dmitrij Vaľukevič	Triple jump	17.08	14	Did not advance	

Combined events – Decathlon

Athlete	Event	100 m	LJ	SP	HJ	400 m	110H	DT	PV	JT	1500 m	Final	Rank
Slaven Dizdarevič	Result	11.16	7.02	13.97	1.96	52.02	15.61	39.86	4.00	43.58	4:51.42	7021	23
Slaven Dizdarevič	Points	825	818	727	767	724	777	662	617	494	610	7021	23

Women
Track & road events

Athlete	Event	Heat		Semifinal		Final	
Athlete	Event	Result	Rank	Result	Rank	Result	Rank
Miriam Bobková	100 m hurdles	13.65	8	Did not advance			
Lucia Klocová	800 m	1:59.42	3 Q	1:58.80	3	Did not advance	
Zuzana Malíková	20 km walk	—				1:34:33 SB	32
Zuzana Tomas	Marathon	—				2:49:39	67

Field events

Athlete	Event	Qualification		Final	
Athlete	Event	Distance	Position	Distance	Position
Jana Velďáková	Long jump	NM	—	Did not advance	
Dana Velďáková	Triple jump	NM	—	Did not advance	
Martina Hrašnová	Hammer throw	72.87	4 Q	71.00	8

== Badminton ==
Athlete	Event	Round of 64	Round of 32	Round of 16	Quarterfinal	Semifinal	Final / BM	
Athlete	Event	Opposition Score	Opposition Score	Opposition Score	Opposition Score	Opposition Score	Opposition Score	Rank
Eva Sládeková	Women's singles	Bye	Wang C (HKG); L 7–21, 7–21	Did not advance				

== Canoeing ==
=== Slalom ===
Athlete	Event	Preliminary						Semifinal		Final			
Athlete	Event	Run 1	Rank	Run 2	Rank	Total	Rank	Time	Rank	Time	Rank	Total	Rank
Peter Cibák	Men's K-1	86.26	=11	86.69	11	172.95	11 Q	89.41	12	Did not advance			
Michal Martikán	Men's C-1	85.13	1	85.02	3	170.15	1 Q	88.92	1 Q	87.73	1	176.65	1st place, gold medalist(s)
Pavol Hochschorner; Peter Hochschorner	Men's C-2	93.69	1	93.04	2	186.73	1 Q	94.88	2 Q	95.94	2	190.82	1st place, gold medalist(s)
Elena Kaliská	Women's K-1	94.34	4	91.85	1	186.19	1 Q	97.13	1	95.51	1	192.64	1st place, gold medalist(s)

=== Sprint ===
Men

Athlete	Event	Heats		Semifinals		Final	
Athlete	Event	Time	Rank	Time	Rank	Time	Rank
Marián Ostrčil	C-1 500 m	1:55.911	6 QS	1:58.401	8	Did not advance	
Marián Ostrčil	C-1 1000 m	4:00.191	3 QS	4:03.696	5	Did not advance	
Michal Riszdorfer; Richard Riszdorfer; Juraj Tarr; Erik Vlček	K-4 1000 m	2:57.876	1 QF	Bye		2:56.593	2nd place, silver medalist(s)

Women

Athlete	Event	Heats		Semifinals		Final	
Athlete	Event	Time	Rank	Time	Rank	Time	Rank
Ivana Kmeťová; Martina Kohlová	K-2 500 m	1:47.284	7 QS	1:46.380	7	Did not advance	

Qualification Legend: QS = Qualify to semi-final; QF = Qualify directly to final

== Cycling ==
=== Road ===
Athlete	Event	Time	Rank
Roman Broniš	Men's road race	Did not finish	
Matej Jurčo	Men's road race	Did not finish	
Matej Jurčo	Men's time trial	1:07:52	29
Ján Valach	Men's road race	6:34:26	62

=== Mountain biking ===
Athlete	Event	Time	Rank
Janka Števková	Women's cross-country	LAP (2 laps)	24

== Gymnastics ==
=== Artistic ===
Women

Athlete	Event	Qualification						Final					
Athlete	Event	Apparatus				Total	Rank	Apparatus				Total	Rank
Athlete	Event	F	V	UB	BB	Total	Rank	F	V	UB	BB	Total	Rank
Ivana Kováčová	Uneven bars	—		12.500	—	12.500	79	Did not advance					
Ivana Kováčová	Balance beam	—			12.350	12.350	81	Did not advance					

== Judo ==
Athlete	Event	Round of 32	Round of 16	Quarterfinals	Semifinals	Repechage 1	Repechage 2	Repechage 3	Final / BM	
Athlete	Event	Opposition Result	Opposition Result	Opposition Result	Opposition Result	Opposition Result	Opposition Result	Opposition Result	Opposition Result	Rank
Zoltán Pálkovács	Men's −100 kg	Costa (ARG); L 0100–0110	Did not advance							

== Sailing ==
Men

Athlete	Event	Race											Net points	Final rank
Athlete	Event	1	2	3	4	5	6	7	8	9	10	M*	Net points	Final rank
Patrik Pollák	RS:X	26	30	25	30	23	28	~~31~~	29	28	24	EL	243	30

M = Medal race; EL = Eliminated – did not advance into the medal race; CAN = Race cancelled

== Shooting ==
Men

Athlete	Event	Qualification		Final	
Athlete	Event	Points	Rank	Points	Rank
Mário Filipovič	Trap	115	14	Did not advance	
Jozef Gönci	50 m rifle prone	593	16	Did not advance	
Jozef Gönci	50 m rifle 3 positions	394	30	Did not advance	
Pavol Kopp	10 m air pistol	575	28	Did not advance	
Pavol Kopp	50 m pistol	563	4 Q	657.6	5*
Erik Varga	Trap	117	9	Did not advance	

* Kim Jong Su of North Korea originally won the silver medal in the 50 m pistol event, but was disqualified after he tested positive for propranolol. Therefore, Pavol Kopp moved up a position.

Women

Athlete	Event	Qualification		Final	
Athlete	Event	Points	Rank	Points	Rank
Danka Barteková	Skeet	67	8	Did not advance	
Daniela Pešková	10 m air rifle	396	9	Did not advance	
Daniela Pešková	50 m rifle 3 positions	577	22	Did not advance	
Zuzana Štefečeková	Trap	70	1 Q	89	2nd place, silver medalist(s)

== Swimming ==
Men

Athlete	Event	Heat		Semifinal		Final	
Athlete	Event	Time	Rank	Time	Rank	Time	Rank
Ľuboš Križko	100 m backstroke	54.07	8 Q	54.38	13	Did not advance	

Women

Athlete	Event	Heat		Semifinal		Final	
Athlete	Event	Time	Rank	Time	Rank	Time	Rank
Martina Moravcová	50 m freestyle	25.47	27	Did not advance			
Martina Moravcová	100 m freestyle	55.20	23	Did not advance			
Martina Moravcová	100 m butterfly	59.03	25	Did not advance			
Denisa Smolenová	200 m butterfly	2:13.81	31	Did not advance			

== Table tennis ==
Athlete	Event	Preliminary round	Round 1	Round 2	Round 3	Round 4	Quarterfinals	Semifinals	Final / BM	
Athlete	Event	Opposition Result	Opposition Result	Opposition Result	Opposition Result	Opposition Result	Opposition Result	Opposition Result	Opposition Result	Rank
Eva Ódorová	Women's singles	Tommy (VAN); W 4–0	Lovas (HUN); W 4–2	Gao (USA); L 2–4	Did not advance					

== Tennis ==
Athlete	Event	Round of 64	Round of 32	Round of 16	Quarterfinals	Semifinals	Final / BM	
Athlete	Event	Opposition Score	Opposition Score	Opposition Score	Opposition Score	Opposition Score	Opposition Score	Rank
Dominik Hrbatý	Men's singles	Bellucci (BRA); W 2–6, 6–4, 6–2	Blake (USA); L 6–7, 6–4, 3–6	Did not advance				
Dominika Cibulková	Women's singles	Parmentier (FRA); W 6–1, 7–5	Pironkova (BUL); W 6–2, 6–2	Janković (SRB); L 5–7, 1–6	Did not advance			
Daniela Hantuchová	Women's singles	Sugiyama (JPN); W 6–2, 7–5	Wozniacki (DEN); L 1–6, 3–6	Did not advance				
Daniela Hantuchová; Janette Husárová	Women's doubles	—	Yan Z / Zheng J (CHN); L 1–6, 6–7^{(9–11)}	Did not advance				

== Triathlon ==
Athlete	Event	Swim (1.5 km)	Trans 1	Bike (40 km)	Trans 2	Run (10 km)	Total Time	Rank
Pavel Šimko	Men's	Did not finish						

== Weightlifting ==
Athlete	Event	Snatch		Clean & Jerk		Total	Rank
Athlete	Event	Result	Rank	Result	Rank	Total	Rank
Ondrej Kutlík	Men's −85 kg	150	15	193	12	343	12
Martin Tešovič	Men's −105 kg	Did not start					

== Wrestling ==
Key:

- VT - Victory by Fall.
- PP - Decision by Points - the loser with technical points.
- PO - Decision by Points - the loser without technical points.

Men's freestyle

Athlete	Event	Qualification	Round of 16	Quarterfinal	Semifinal	Repechage 1	Repechage 2	Final / BM	
Athlete	Event	Opposition Result	Opposition Result	Opposition Result	Opposition Result	Opposition Result	Opposition Result	Opposition Result	Rank
David Musuľbes	−120 kg	Bye	Siewari (NGR); W 3–0 ^{PO}	Aubéli (HUN); W 3–1 ^{PP}	Taymazov (UZB); L 0–3 ^{PO}	Bye		Rodríguez (CUB); W 3–1 ^{PP}	2nd place, silver medalist(s)

Men's Greco-Roman

Athlete	Event	Qualification	Round of 16	Quarterfinal	Semifinal	Repechage 1	Repechage 2	Final / BM	
Athlete	Event	Opposition Result	Opposition Result	Opposition Result	Opposition Result	Opposition Result	Opposition Result	Opposition Result	Rank
Attila Bátky	−84 kg	Estrada (CUB); L 0–3 ^{PO}	Did not advance						19

== See also ==
- Slovakia at the 2008 Summer Paralympics
