= Norman Bröckl =

German sprint canoeist

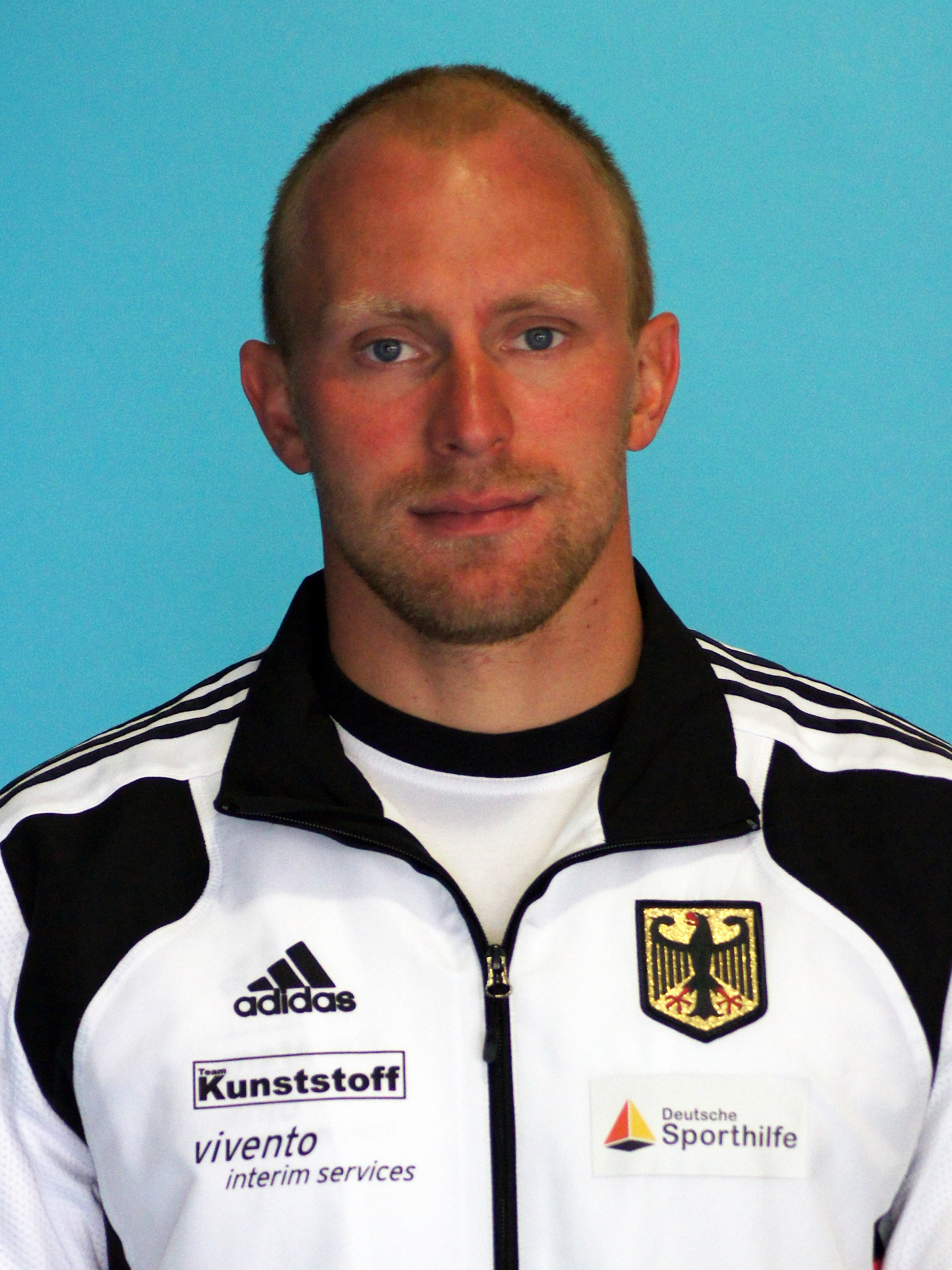
- Bröckl in 2008

Medal record

Men's canoe sprint

Representing Germany

Olympic Games
Bronze medal – third place	2008 Beijing	K-4 1000 m

World Championships
Gold medal – first place	2005 Zagreb	K-4 1000 m
Gold medal – first place	2007 Duisburg	K-4 1000 m
Gold medal – first place	2011 Szeged	K-4 1000 m
Silver medal – second place	2005 Zagreb	K-4 200 m
Silver medal – second place	2009 Dartmouth	K-1 4 x 200 m

European Championships
Silver medal – second place	2011 Belgrade	K-4 1000 m

Norman Bröckl (born 22 August 1986 in Berlin) is a German sprint canoer who has competed since 2003. He won a bronze medal in the K-4 1000 m event on his 22nd birthday at the 2008 Summer Olympics in Beijing (with Lutz Altepost, Torsten Eckbrett and Björn Goldschmidt).

== Career ==
Bröckl enjoyed great success as a junior. At the 2003 Junior World Championships in Komatsu, Japan he won a K-2 1000 m gold medal Lieven Spur partnering and the K-1 500 m silver medal, behind Portugal's Emanuel Silva. In 2004 he dominated the Junior European Championships, winning three gold medals (K-1 500 m, K-1 1000 m and K-4 500 m).

He was promoted to Germany's senior K-4 crew in 2005. His senior debut, at the European championships in Poznań, went badly - Bröckl has admitted that he "froze" - and the German crew finished outside the medals in both the 500 m and 1000 m races. They did take the 200 m bronze medal on the last day of the championships, but the German coaches decided that Bröckl was not yet ready for the responsibility of leading the crew from the bow-seat in the (more tactical) longer distance races. He therefore switched seats with the more experienced Lutz Altepost for the 1000 m races at the world championships in Zagreb, Croatia. This time there were no nerves and Germany won the K-4 1000 m gold medal. In the 200 m final, with Bröckl leading, they picked up a silver medal.

2006 proved a disappointing season for Bröckl and his teammates. They took the 1000 m bronze medal at the European Championships in Račice, Czech Republic in July. However at the World Championships in Szeged, Hungary, the German K4 "Flagschiff" finished outside the medals in all three distances. It was the first time since 1977 that no men's German boat reached the podium. Bröckl and his teammates redeemed themselves the following year at Duisburg with a gold in the K-4 1000 m event. He would also win a silver in the K-1 4 x 200 m event at the 2009 championships.

Bröckl is a member of the Pro Sport Berlin club.
