= Mordarski =

Mordarski is a Polish surname. Notable people with the surname include:

- Ryszard Mordarski (born 1976), Polish slalom canoeist
- Sławomir Mordarski (born 1979), Polish slalom canoeist, brother of Ryszard
- Zdzisław Mordarski (1922–1991), Polish footballer
