= Canoeing at the 2008 Summer Olympics – Men's slalom K-1 =

The men's K-1 slalom competition in canoeing at the 2008 Summer Olympics took place between August 11 and 12 2008 at the Shunyi Olympic Rowing-Canoeing Park in Beijing. The K-1 (single kayak) event was raced by one-man kayaks through a whitewater course.

There were three rounds of competitions: the heats, the semifinal, and the final. In the heats, each canoeist completed two runs of the course. The time, in seconds, of each run was added to the number of penalty points assessed. Touching any of the 21 slalom gates resulted in a 2-second penalty for each gate touched, while skipping any of the gates resulted in a 50-second penalty. The total times for the two preliminary runs were summed to give a score for the heats. The top 15 boats advanced to the semifinals.

The semifinals consisted of a single run. The field was narrowed to the top 10 scores from that run; those 10 boats advanced to the final. The times from the final were added to the semifinal score to give an overall total.

== Schedule ==
All times are China Standard Time (UTC+8)

Date	Time	Round
Monday, August 11, 2008	15:50-16:50	Heats 1st Run
Monday, August 11, 2008	17:42-18:40	Heats 2nd Run
Tuesday, August 12, 2008	15:40-16:40	Semifinal
Tuesday, August 12, 2008	17:17-18:00	Final

== Medalists ==
Gold	Silver	Bronze
Alexander Grimm (GER)	Fabien Lefèvre (FRA)	Benjamin Boukpeti (TOG)

== Results ==
=== Heats ===
Rank	Name	Country	Preliminary runs		
Rank	Name	Country	Run 1	Run 2	Total
1	Peter Kauzer	Slovenia	81.79	84.70	166.49
2	Fabien Lefèvre	France	85.66	82.40	168.06
3	Daniele Molmenti	Italy	85.13	83.46	168.59
4	Alexander Grimm	Germany	84.90	84.36	169.26
5	Dariusz Popiela	Poland	85.51	85.51	171.02
6	Helmut Oblinger	Austria	86.21	85.54	171.75
7	Vavřinec Hradilek	Czech Republic	85.61	86.41	172.02
8	Benjamin Boukpeti	Togo	90.17	82.09	172.26
9	Campbell Walsh	Great Britain	86.72	85.72	172.44
10	Warwick Draper	Australia	86.28	86.30	172.58
11	Peter Cibák	Slovakia	86.26	86.69	172.95
12	Guillermo Díez-Canedo	Spain	84.95	88.07	173.02
13	David Ford	Canada	85.35	89.49	174.84
14	Robert Bouten	Netherlands	86.26	88.90	175.16
15	Eoin Rheinisch	Ireland	88.52	87.81	176.33
16	Pablo McCandless	Chile	88.24	88.40	176.64
17	Michael Kurt	Switzerland	87.58	91.08	178.66
18	Kazuki Yazawa	Japan	89.82	90.05	179.87
19	Atanas Nikolovski	Macedonia	92.63	88.56	181.19
20	Scott Parsons	United States	84.91	135.63	220.54
21	Ding Fuxue	China	87.47	140.92	228.39

Qualified for semifinals

=== Semifinal ===
Rank	Name	Country	Semifinal run	
Rank	Name	Country	Penalty seconds	Time
1	Benjamin Boukpeti	Togo	0	86.08
2	Warwick Draper	Australia	0	86.09
3	Fabien Lefèvre	France	0	87.21
4	Alexander Grimm	Germany	0	87.31
5	Robert Bouten	Netherlands	0	88.40
6	David Ford	Canada	0	88.46
7	Dariusz Popiela	Poland	0	88.49
8	Daniele Molmenti	Italy	2	88.56
9	Helmut Oblinger	Austria	0	88.69
10	Eoin Rheinisch	Ireland	0	88.85
11	Vavřinec Hradilek	Czech Republic	0	88.97
12	Peter Cibák	Slovakia	2	89.41
13	Peter Kauzer	Slovenia	4	89.42
14	Guillermo Díez-Canedo	Spain	2	90.06
15	Campbell Walsh	Great Britain	2	95.74

Qualified for final

=== Final ===
Rank	Name	Country	Semifinal run		Final run		Total
Rank	Name	Country	Penalty seconds	Time	Penalty seconds	Time	Total
1st place, gold medalist(s)	Alexander Grimm	Germany	0	87.31	0	84.39	171.70
2nd place, silver medalist(s)	Fabien Lefèvre	France	0	87.21	0	86.09	173.30
3rd place, bronze medalist(s)	Benjamin Boukpeti	Togo	0	86.08	0	87.37	173.45
4	Eoin Rheinisch	Ireland	0	88.85	0	88.06	176.91
5	Warwick Draper	Australia	0	86.09	0	91,76	177,85
6	David Ford	Canada	0	88.46	2	87,89	178,35
7	Helmut Oblinger	Austria	0	88.69	2	88,14	178,83
8	Dariusz Popiela	Poland	0	88.49	0	91,19	179,68
9	Robert Bouten	Netherlands	0	88.40	50	89,59	227,99
10	Daniele Molmenti	Italy	2	88.56	52	90,37	230,93
