= 1994 World Junior Canoe Slalom Championships =

The 1994 ICF World Junior Canoe Slalom Championships were the 5th edition of the ICF World Junior Canoe Slalom Championships. The event took place in Wausau, Wisconsin, United States from 28 to 31 July 1994 under the auspices of the International Canoe Federation (ICF).

Seven medal events took place. No medals were awarded for the C2 team event.

== Medal summary ==
=== Men ===
==== Canoe ====
Event	Gold		Silver		Bronze	
C1	Michal Martikán (SVK)	179.36	Mariusz Wieczorek (POL)	183.97	Dejan Stevanovič (SLO)	186.19
C1 team	Czech Republic; Pavel Janda; Stanislav Ježek; Tomáš Indruch	208.91	France; Cedric Legal; Tony Estanguet; Luc Lalubie	219.42	Germany; Andreas Krohn; Steffen Conradt; Gerit Hönicke	225.99
C2	Štěpán Chromovský/Jan Jireš (CZE)	198.76	Chris Ennis/John Grumbine (USA)	201.64	Jaroslav Volf/Ondřej Štěpánek (CZE)	203.95
C2 team (non-medal event)	Czech Republic; Jan Jireš/Štěpán Chromovský; Václav Šmíd/Vladimír Buchnar; Jaroslav Volf/Ondřej Štěpánek	225.49	Slovakia; Milan Kubáň/Marián Olejník; Ľuboš Šoška/Peter Šoška; Peter Kvašňovský/Martin Kostek	237.40	Germany; Manuel Dosal/Eduardo Nieto; Johannes Lienemann/Tim Wallraff; Switzerland; Raoul Brodmann/Markus Zürcher	240.39

==== Kayak ====
Event	Gold		Silver		Bronze	
K1	Pavol Hric (SVK)	174.36	Ralf Schaberg (GER)	174.42	Dejan Kralj (SLO)	174.59
K1 team	Slovenia; Aleš Kuder; Rok Kodelja; Dejan Kralj	192.15	United States; Kyle Elliott; Josh Russell; Scott Parsons	196.41	Germany; Ralf Schaberg; Thomas Schmidt; Christoph Erber	198.97

=== Women ===
==== Kayak ====
Event	Gold		Silver		Bronze	
K1	Stanislava Kováčová (SVK)	192.46	Diane Woods (GBR)	197.70	Veronika Řihošková (CZE)	197.97
K1 team	Czech Republic; Michala Říhová; Vanda Semerádová; Veronika Řihošková	231.80	Germany; Phillis Ahlfaenger; Diana Hildebrandt; Hella Pannewig	241.72	France; Anais Tharaud; Chantal Gerbet; Annaig Pedrono	254.65

== Medal table ==
Rank	Nation	Gold	Silver	Bronze	Total
1	Czech Republic (CZE)	3	0	2	5
2	Slovakia (SVK)	3	0	0	3
3	Slovenia (SLO)	1	0	2	3
4	Germany (GER)	0	2	2	4
5	United States (USA)	0	2	0	2
6	France (FRA)	0	1	1	2
7	Great Britain (GBR)	0	1	0	1
7	Poland (POL)	0	1	0	1
Totals (8 entries)		7	7	7	21
