= Canoeing at the 2004 Summer Olympics – Men's slalom K-1 =

These are the results of the men's K-1 slalom competition in canoeing at the 2004 Summer Olympics. The K-1 (kayak single) event is raced by one-man kayaks through a whitewater course. The venue for the 2004 Olympic competition was the Olympic Canoe/Kayak Slalom Centre at the Helliniko Olympic Complex.

== Medalists ==
Gold	Silver	Bronze
Benoît Peschier (FRA)	Campbell Walsh (GBR)	Fabien Lefèvre (FRA)

== Results ==
The 25 competitors each took two preliminary runs through the whitewater slalom course. The top 20 kayakers by combined time from the two runs advanced to the semifinal. The top 10 times from the single semifinal run determined the finalists. Ranking and medals are based on the combined time of the semifinal run and the final run. The preliminary runs were raced on August 19 and the semifinal and final runs were on August 20.

Rank	Name	Country	Preliminary Round				Semifinal		Final	
Rank	Name	Country	Run 1	Run 2	Total	Rank	Time	Rank	Time	Total
Gold	Benoît Peschier	France	99.33	95.04	194.37	8	93.93	2	94.03	187.96
Silver	Campbell Walsh	Great Britain	91.25	97.73	188.98	2	93.68	1	96.49	190.17
Bronze	Fabien Lefèvre	France	95.00	95.80	190.80	4	95.13	6	95.86	190.99
4	David Ford	Canada	101.30	98.57	199.87	16	95.83	7	96.75	192.58
5	Thomas Schmidt	Germany	93.28	97.36	190.64	3	95.11	5	97.82	192.93
6	Scott Parsons	United States	98.15	100.06	198.21	14	96.82	9	97.94	194.76
7	Grzegorz Polaczyk	Poland	97.97	97.49	195.46	12	94.74	4	101.83	196.57
8	Sam Oud	Netherlands	107.27	95.41	202.68	20	94.46	3	102.82	197.28
9	Warwick Draper	Australia	99.69	101.41	201.10	18	97.03	10	100.40	197.43
10	Uroš Kodelja	Slovenia	102.24	97.99	200.23	17	96.68	8	104.93	201.61
11	Carles Juanmartí	Spain	99.47	96.61	196.08	13	97.73	11		
12	Ján Šajbidor	Slovakia	95.13	99.76	194.89	10	97.77	12		
13	Helmut Oblinger	Austria	94.25	98.94	193.19	7	98.02	13		
14	Ondřej Raab	Czech Republic	98.54	95.96	194.50	9	98.13	14		
15	Brett Heyl	United States	95.68	96.61	192.29	5	100.28	15		
16	Lazar Popovski	Macedonia	96.92	96.14	193.06	6	100.80	16		
17	Floris Braat	Netherlands	97.96	97.18	195.14	11	101.39	17		
18	Benjamin Boukpeti	Togo	96.99	101.93	198.92	15	102.42	18		
19	Pierpaolo Ferrazzi	Italy	99.70	102.23	201.93	19	103.07	19		
20	Michael Kurt	Switzerland	94.30	92.49	186.79	1	103.20	20		
21	Eoin Rheinisch	Ireland	105.25	98.81	204.06	21				
22	Dinko Mulić	Croatia	102.71	108.05	210.76	22				
23	Emir Šarganović	Bosnia and Herzegovina	111.26	105.04	216.30	23				
24	Alexandros Dimitriou	Greece	122.87	113.34	236.21	24				
25	Jens Ewald	Germany	150.69	99.40	250.09	25				
