= Mulić =

Mulić (Serbian Cyrillic: Мулић, pronounced [mulitɕ]) is a Bosnian family name which is more common among Bosniaks than Croats and Serbs.

Notable people with this name include:

- Dinko Mulić (born 1983), Bosnian-born Croatian slalom canoer
- Fejsal Mulić (born 1994), Serbian footballer
- Demir Mulić (born 1993), Montenegrin cyclist
- Hamdija Mulić (1881–1944), Bosnian educator and journalist
- Malik Mulić (1917–1980), Bosnian publicist, translator, editor and academic lecturer
