= Canoeing at the 2008 Summer Olympics – Men's K-4 1000 metres =

The men's K-4 1000 metres competition in canoeing at the 2008 Summer Olympics took place at the Shunyi Olympic Rowing-Canoeing Park in Beijing between August 18 and 22. The K-4 event is raced in four-person kayaks.

Competition consists of three rounds: the heats, the semifinals, and the final. All boats compete in the heats. The top three finishers in each of the two heats advance directly to the final, while the remaining four finishers in each heat move on to the semifinal. The top three finishers in the semifinal join the top heat finishers in the final.

Heats took place on August 18, semifinal on August 20, and the final on August 22.

== Schedule ==
All times are China Standard Time (UTC+8)

Date	Time	Round
Monday, August 18, 2008	17:30-17:50	Heats
Wednesday, August 20, 2008	16:40-16:50	Semifinal
Friday, August 22, 2008	17:20-17:35	Final

== Medalists ==
Gold	Silver	Bronze
Belarus; Raman Piatrushenka; Aliaksei Abalmasau; Artur Litvinchuk; Vadzim Makhneu	Slovakia; Richard Riszdorfer; Michal Riszdorfer; Erik Vlček; Juraj Tarr	Germany; Lutz Altepost; Norman Bröckl; Torsten Eckbrett; Björn Goldschmidt

== Results ==
=== Heats ===
Qualification Rules: 1..3->Final, 4..7->Semifinal + 8th best time, Rest Out

==== Heat 1 ====
Rank	Athletes	Country	Time	Notes
1	Lutz Altepost, Norman Bröckl, Torsten Eckbrett, Björn Goldschmidt	Germany	2:57.148	QF
2	Márton Sík, István Beé, Ákos Vereckei, Gábor Bozsik	Hungary	2:57.242	QF
3	Raman Piatrushenka, Aliaksei Abalmasau, Artur Litvinchuk, Vadzim Makhneu	Belarus	2:58.825	QF
4	Li Zhen, Liu Haitao, Zhou Peng, Lin Miao	China	2:59.271	QS
5	David Smith, Tony Schumacher, Tate Smith, Clint Robinson	Australia	3:00.920	QS

==== Heat 2 ====
Rank	Athletes	Country	Time	Notes
1	Richard Riszdorfer, Michal Riszdorfer, Erik Vlček, Juraj Tarr	Slovakia	2:57.876	QF
2	Franco Benedini, Antonio Rossi, Alberto Ricchetti, Luca Piemonte	Italy	2:58.627	QF
3	Marek Twardowski, Tomasz Mendelski, Paweł Baumann, Adam Wysocki	Poland	2:59.290	QF
4	Ilya Medvedev, Evgeny Salakhov, Anton Vasilev, Konstantin Vishnyakov	Russia	2:59.518	QS
5	Brady Reardon, Angus Mortimer, Chris Pellini, Rhys Hill	Canada	3:06.811	QS

=== Semifinal ===
Qualification Rules: 1..3->Final, Rest Out

Rank	Athletes	Country	Time	Notes
1	Ilya Medvedev, Evgeny Salakhov, Anton Vasilev, Konstantin Vishnyakov	Russia	3:00.459	QF
2	Li Zhen, Liu Haitao, Zhou Peng, Lin Miao	China	3:01.787	QF
3	Brady Reardon, Angus Mortimer, Chris Pellini, Rhys Hill	Canada	3:02.572	QF
4	David Smith, Tony Schumacher, Tate Smith, Clint Robinson	Australia	3:02.743	

=== Final ===
Rank	Athletes	Country	Time	Notes
Gold medal	Raman Piatrushenka, Aliaksei Abalmasau, Artur Litvinchuk, Vadzim Makhneu	Belarus	2:55.714	
Silver medal	Richard Riszdorfer, Michal Riszdorfer, Erik Vlček, Juraj Tarr	Slovakia	2:56.593	
Bronze medal	Lutz Altepost, Norman Bröckl, Torsten Eckbrett, Björn Goldschmidt	Germany	2:56.676	
4	Franco Benedini, Antonio Rossi, Alberto Ricchetti, Luca Piemonte	Italy	2:57.626	
5	Márton Sík, István Beé, Ákos Vereckei, Gábor Bozsik	Hungary	2:59.009	
6	Marek Twardowski, Tomasz Mendelski, Paweł Baumann, Adam Wysocki	Poland	2:59.505	
7	Li Zhen, Liu Haitao, Zhou Peng, Lin Miao	China	3:00.078	
8	Ilya Medvedev, Evgeny Salakhov, Anton Vasilev, Konstantin Vishnyakov	Russia	3:00.654	
9	Brady Reardon, Angus Mortimer, Chris Pellini, Rhys Hill	Canada	3:01.630	
