= Emir Šarganović =

Bosnian slalom canoer (born 1983)

Emir Šarganović (born 23 September 1983) is a Bosnian slalom canoer who competed from the late 1990s to the mid-2000s. Competing at the 2004 Summer Olympics in Athens in the K-1 event, he finished twenty-third in the qualification round, failing to progress to the semifinals.
