= Claus Suchanek =

German slalom canoeist (born 1979)

Medal record

Men's canoe slalom

Representing Germany

World Championships
Gold medal – first place	2002 Bourg St.-Maurice	K1 team
Bronze medal – third place	2003 Augsburg	K1 team

European Championships
Gold medal – first place	2002 Bratislava	K1 team

Junior World Championships
Silver medal – second place	1996 Lipno	K1 team

Junior European Championships
Silver medal – second place	1995 Liptovský Mikuláš	K1 team
Silver medal – second place	1997 Nowy Sącz	K1

Claus Suchanek (born 1979) is a German slalom canoeist who competed at the international level from 1995 to 2003.

He won two medals in the K1 team event at the ICF Canoe Slalom World Championships with a gold in 2002 and a bronze in 2003. He also won a gold medal in the same event at the 2002 European Championships in Bratislava.

== World Cup individual podiums ==
Season	Date	Venue	Position	Event
2002	20 Jul 2002	Augsburg	3rd	K1
