= 1996 World Junior Canoe Slalom Championships =

The 1996 ICF World Junior Canoe Slalom Championships were the 6th edition of the ICF World Junior Canoe Slalom Championships. The event took place in Lipno nad Vltavou, Czech Republic from 11 to 14 July 1996 under the auspices of the International Canoe Federation (ICF).

A total of eight medal events took place.

== Medal summary ==
=== Men ===
==== Canoe ====
Event	Gold		Silver		Bronze	
C1	Jan Mašek (CZE)	129.73	Michal Martikán (SVK)	132.56	Stanislav Gejdoš (SVK)	137.01
C1 team	Czech Republic; Jan Mašek; Jan Pytelka; Martin Vlk	156.79	Slovakia; Stanislav Gejdoš; Michal Martikán; Dušan Ovčarík	170.78	France; Ronan Betrom; Tony Estanguet; Eric Labarelle	175.15
C2	Jaroslav Volf/Ondřej Štěpánek (CZE)	133.59	Kay Simon/Robby Simon (GER)	136.53	Konrad Korzeniewski/Jarosław Nawrocki (POL)	138.34
C2 team	Czech Republic; Martin Rasner/Jan Hošek; Jan Rieger/Tomáš Buchnar; Jaroslav Volf/Ondřej Štěpánek	177.68	Poland; Konrad Korzeniewski/Jarosław Nawrocki; Krzysztof Nosal/Marek Kowalczyk; Andrzej Wójs/Sławomir Mordarski	206.90	France; Anthony Colin/Mickaël Sabelle; Gauthier Gonseth/Maxime Vallin; Sebastien Paolacci/Alexandre Martins	212.72

==== Kayak ====
Event	Gold		Silver		Bronze	
K1	Sam Oud (NED)	120.44	Floris Braat (NED)	121.15	Ivan Pišvejc (CZE)	121.24
K1 team	Czech Republic; Tomáš Kobes; Jan Kratochvíl; Ivan Pišvejc	136.10	Germany; Fabian Bär; Christoph Erber; Claus Suchanek	138.14	Slovenia; Miha Brezigar; Vasja Kavs; Miha Terdič	145.25

=== Women ===
==== Kayak ====
Event	Gold		Silver		Bronze	
K1	Helen Reeves (GBR)	140.09	Vanda Semerádová (CZE)	140.33	Gabriela Stacherová (SVK)	142.47
K1 team	Czech Republic; Barbora Jirková; Hana Pešková; Vanda Semerádová	164.88	Slovakia; Blanka Lejsalová; Kristýna Mrázová; Gabriela Stacherová	178.36	France; Marie Gaspard; Stephanie Kaczmarek; Anne-Line Poncet	182.60

== Medal table ==
Rank	Nation	Gold	Silver	Bronze	Total
1	Czech Republic (CZE)	6	1	1	8
2	Netherlands (NED)	1	1	0	2
3	Great Britain (GBR)	1	0	0	1
4	Slovakia (SVK)	0	3	2	5
5	Germany (GER)	0	2	0	2
6	Poland (POL)	0	1	1	2
7	France (FRA)	0	0	3	3
8	Slovenia (SLO)	0	0	1	1
Totals (8 entries)		8	8	8	24
