= Konstantin Vishnyakov =

Russian canoeist

Medal record

Men's canoe sprint

World Championships
Bronze medal – third place	2006 Szeged	K-4 200 m
Bronze medal – third place	2007 Dusiburg	K-4 200 m

Konstantin Vishnyakov (born March 6, 1982) is a Russian sprint canoer who has competed since the late 2000s. He won two bronze medals in the K-4 200 m event at the ICF Canoe Sprint World Championships, earning them in 2006 and 2007.

Vishnyakov also finished eighth in the K-4 1000 m event at the 2008 Summer Olympics in Beijing. The last showing in a World Championship was in 2011, where he placed seventh in the Men's K-2 500m kayak double.
