= Rhys Hill =

Canadian sprint kayaker (born 1986)

Rhys Hill (born February 8, 1986 in Ottawa) is a Canadian sprint kayaker who competed in the late 2000s. At the 2008 Summer Olympics in Beijing, he finished ninth in the K-4 1000 m event.
