= Luca Piemonte =

Italian canoeist

Medal record

Men's canoe sprint

World Championships
Bronze medal – third place	2005 Zagreb	K-4 500 m2002 Szeged

Luca Piemonte (born 11 November 1978) is an Italian sprint canoer who has competed since the mid-2000s.

He won a bronze medal in the K -4 500 m at the 2002 European Championships in Szeged, and another bronze medal in the K-4 500 m at the 2005 ICF Canoe Sprint World Championships in Zagreb. He won another bronze in the 2008 in the K-2 1000 m event at the Mediterranean Games in Pescara. Piemonte finished fourth in the K-4 1000 m event at the 2008 Summer Olympics in Beijing.
