= 1995 European Junior Canoe Slalom Championships =

- Location: Liptovský Mikuláš, Slovakia

The 1995 European Junior Canoe Slalom Championships were the inaugural edition of the European Junior Canoe Slalom Championships. The event took place in Liptovský Mikuláš, Slovakia from 13 to 16 July 1995 under the auspices of the European Canoe Association (ECA) at the Ondrej Cibak Whitewater Slalom Course. A total of 8 medal events took place.

== Medal summary ==
=== Men ===
==== Canoe ====
Event	Gold		Silver		Bronze	
C1	Michal Martikán (SVK)	145.91	Tony Estanguet (FRA)	151.64	Juraj Minčík (SVK)	157.91
C1 team	Slovakia; Michal Martikán; Juraj Minčík; Dušan Ovčarík	177.51	Germany; Andreas Krohn; Jan Heinecke; Steffen Conradt	192.44	France; Tony Estanguet; Guillaume Wattez; Ugo Richard	198.73
C2	Sławomir Mordarski/Andrzej Wójs (POL)	164.66	Robby Simon/Kay Simon (GER)	175.08	Frank Henze/Sebastian Brendel (GER)	179.08
C2 team	France; Mathieu Faure/Nicolas Soubiran; Anthony Colin/Mickaël Sabelle; Laurent Bouvard/Sébastien Bouvard	216.30	Poland; Andrzej Wójs/Sławomir Mordarski; Konrad Korzeniewski/Jarosław Nawrocki; Krzysztof Nosal/Marek Kowalczyk	235.22	Czech Republic; Aleš Daněk/Jindřich Štencl; Lukáš Přinda/Jan Kolář; Jan Rieger/Tomáš Buchnar	266.85

==== Kayak ====
Event	Gold		Silver		Bronze	
K1	Ivan Pišvejc (CZE)	144.91	Julien Dekarczyk (FRA)	147.00	Tomáš Kobes (CZE)	147.11
K1 team	Czech Republic; Ivan Pišvejc; Tomáš Kobes; Radek Kratochvíl	172.37	Germany; Claus Suchanek; Ralf Schaberg; Matthias Urban	178.74	Slovenia; Aleš Kuder; Uroš Škander; Matej Gec	179.95

=== Women ===
==== Kayak ====
Event	Gold		Silver		Bronze	
K1	Vanda Semerádová (CZE)	165.46	Gabriela Stacherová (SVK)	167.73	Kristýna Mrázová (SVK)	169.01
K1 team	France; Lydia Faugeroux; Annaig Pedrono; Marie Gaspard	207.44	Czech Republic; Vanda Semerádová; Hana Pešková; Barbora Jirková	208.34	Slovakia; Kristýna Mrázová; Gabriela Stacherová; Blanka Lejsalová	211.18

== Medal table ==
Rank	Nation	Gold	Silver	Bronze	Total
1	Czech Republic (CZE)	3	1	2	6
2	France (FRA)	2	2	1	5
3	Slovakia (SVK)	2	1	3	6
4	Poland (POL)	1	1	0	2
5	Germany (GER)	0	3	1	4
6	Slovenia (SLO)	0	0	1	1
Totals (6 entries)		8	8	8	24
