= Andrzej Wójs =

Polish slalom canoeist (born 1979)

Medal record

Men's canoe slalom

Representing Poland

World Championships
| Bronze medal – third place | 2002 Bourg St.-Maurice | C2 team |
| Bronze medal – third place | 2003 Augsburg | C2 team |

European Championships
| Silver medal – second place | 1996 Augsburg | C2 team |

Junior World Championships
| Silver medal – second place | 1996 Lipno | C2 team |

Junior European Championships
| Gold medal – first place | 1995 Liptovský Mikuláš | C2 |
| Gold medal – first place | 1997 Nowy Sącz | C2 |
| Gold medal – first place | 1997 Nowy Sącz | C1 team |
| Silver medal – second place | 1995 Liptovský Mikuláš | C2 team |

Andrzej Wójs (born 5 December 1979 in Nowy Sącz) is a Polish slalom canoeist who competed at the international level from 1995 to 2005.

He won two bronze medals in the C2 team event at the ICF Canoe Slalom World Championships (2002, 2003). He also won a silver medal in the same event at the 1996 European Championships in Augsburg. Wójs also competed in two Summer Olympics, earning his best finish of sixth in the C2 event in Sydney in 2000.

His partner in the C2 boat for most of his active career was Sławomir Mordarski.

== World Cup individual podiums ==
| Season | Date | Venue | Position | Event |
|---|---|---|---|---|
| 2000 | 2 Jul 2000 | Saint-Pé-de-Bigorre | 2nd | C2 |
| 2001 | 10 Jun 2001 | Tacen | 1st | C2 |
| 2001 | 28 Jul 2001 | Augsburg | 1st | C2 |
| 2001 | 5 Aug 2001 | Prague | 1st | C2 |
