= Brady Reardon =

Canadian sprint kayaker

Personal information
- Born: 3 January 1986 (age 39); Burlington, Ontario, Canada

Sport
- Sport: Canoeing

Brady Reardon (born January 3, 1986) is a Canadian sprint kayaker. At the 2008 Summer Olympics in Beijing, he finished ninth the K-4 1000 m event. He won several World Cup and international medals.
