= Ralf Schaberg =

German slalom canoeist (born 1977)

Medal record

Men's canoe slalom

Representing Germany

World Championships
Gold medal – first place	1999 La Seu d'Urgell	K1 team

European Championships
Gold medal – first place	1998 Roudnice nad Labem	K1 team

Junior World Championships
Silver medal – second place	1994 Wausau	K1
Bronze medal – third place	1994 Wausau	K1 team

Junior European Championships
Silver medal – second place	1995 Liptovský Mikuláš	K1 team

Ralf Schaberg (born 1977) is a German slalom canoeist who competed at the international level from 1994 to 1999.

He won a gold medal in the K1 team event at the 1999 ICF Canoe Slalom World Championships in La Seu d'Urgell and also at the 1998 European Championships in Roudnice nad Labem.
