= Chris Ennis Jr. =

American slalom canoeist

Medal record

Men's canoe slalom

Representing United States

Junior World Championships
Silver medal – second place	1994 Wausau	C2

Chris Ennis Jr. (born July 13, 1976 in Raleigh, North Carolina) is an American slalom canoeist who competed at the international level from 1994 to 2004.

He was eliminated in the qualifying round of the C1 event at the 2004 Summer Olympics in Athens, finishing in 16th place. During his training, he was employed at the Nantahala Outdoor Center.
