= Vanda Semerádová =

Czech slalom canoeist (born 1978)

Medal record

Women's canoe slalom

Representing Czech Republic

World Championships
Gold medal – first place	2003 Augsburg	K1 team

Junior World Championships
Gold medal – first place	1994 Wausau	K1 team
Gold medal – first place	1996 Lipno	K1 team
Silver medal – second place	1996 Lipno	K1

Junior European Championships
Gold medal – first place	1995 Liptovský Mikuláš	K1
Silver medal – second place	1995 Liptovský Mikuláš	K1 team

Vanda Semerádová (born 1978) is a Czech slalom canoeist who competed at the international level from 1994 to 2004.

She won a gold medal in the K1 team event at the 2003 ICF Canoe Slalom World Championships in Augsburg.
