= Tomáš Kobes =

Czech slalom canoeist (born 1978)

Medal record

Men's canoe slalom

Representing Czech Republic

World Championships
Bronze medal – third place	1999 La Seu d'Urgell	K1 team

European Championships
Silver medal – second place	2002 Bratislava	K1 team
Bronze medal – third place	2004 Skopje	K1 team

Junior World Championships
Gold medal – first place	1996 Lipno	K1 team

Junior European Championships
Gold medal – first place	1995 Liptovský Mikuláš	K1 team
Bronze medal – third place	1995 Liptovský Mikuláš	K1

Tomáš Kobes (born 14 May 1978 in Český Krumlov) is a Czech slalom canoeist who competed at the international level from 1995 to 2007.

Kobes won a bronze medal in the K1 team event at the 1999 ICF Canoe Slalom World Championships in La Seu d'Urgell. He also won a silver and a bronze medal in the same event at the European Championships.

Kobes finished seventh in the K1 event at the 2000 Summer Olympics in Sydney.

== World Cup individual podiums ==
Season	Date	Venue	Position	Event
2001	27 May 2001	Goumois	3rd	K1
2001	5 Aug 2001	Prague	1st	K1
