= Tomáš Mráz =

Slovak slalom canoeist (born 1980)

Personal information
- Nationality: Slovak
- Born: 7 February 1980 (age 46) Liptovský Mikuláš, Czechoslovakia
- Years active: 1995 - 2012

Sport
- Country: Slovakia
- Sport: Canoe slalom
- Event: K1
Medal record
Men's canoe slalom
Representing Slovakia
European Championships
Bronze medal – third place	2002 Bratislava	K1 team
Junior European Championships
Silver medal – second place	1997 Nowy Sącz	K1 team

Tomáš Mráz (born 7 February 1980) is a former Slovak slalom canoeist who competed at the international level from 1995 to 2012, specializing in the K1 discipline.

Mráz won a bronze medal in the K1 team event at the 2002 European Championships in Bratislava. He finished 10th in the K1 overall World Cup standings in 2008.

He has coached several Slovak slalom canoeists including Jakub Grigar, Marko Mirgorodský and Monika Škáchová. His father Peter Mráz coached two-time Olympic Champion Elena Kaliská.

== Major championships results timeline ==
Event		1998	1999	2000	2001	2002	2003	2004	2005	2006	2007	2008	2009	2010
World Championships	K1	Not held	—	Not held		32	—	Not held	41	39	39	Not held	—	81
World Championships	K1 team	Not held	—	Not held		6	—	Not held	4	7	8	Not held	—	7
European Championships	K1	31	Not held	—	Not held	11	Not held	18	14	23	17	19	—	4
European Championships	K1 team	—	Not held	—	Not held	3	Not held	5	12	7	5	17	—	5
