= Gábor Bozsik =

Hungarian canoeist (born 1981)

Medal record

Men's canoe sprint

World Championships
Silver medal – second place	2006 Szeged	K-4 500 m
Bronze medal – third place	2007 Duisburg	K-4 500 m

Gábor Bozsik (born October 26, 1981) is a Hungarian sprint canoer who has competed since the mid-2000s. He won two medals in the K-4 500 m at the ICF Canoe Sprint World Championships with a silver in 2006 and a bronze in 2007.

Bozsik also finished fifth in the K-4 1000 m event at the 2008 Summer Olympics in Beijing.
