= Gabriela Stacherová =

Slovak slalom canoeist (born 1980)

Personal information
- Nationality: Slovak
- Born: 4 February 1980 (age 46) Zvolen, Czechoslovakia
- Height: 1.80 m (5 ft 11 in)
- Weight: 73 kg (161 lb)

Sport
- Country: Slovakia
- Sport: Canoe slalom
- Event: K1
Medal record
Women's canoe slalom
Representing Slovakia
World Championships
Silver medal – second place	2009 La Seu d'Urgell	K1 team
European Championships
Gold medal – first place	2000 Mezzana	K1 team
Gold medal – first place	2006 L'Argentière-la-Bessée	K1 team
Silver medal – second place	2002 Bratislava	K1 team
Silver medal – second place	2007 Liptovský Mikuláš	K1 team
Silver medal – second place	2008 Kraków	K1 team
Silver medal – second place	2009 Nottingham	K1 team
Bronze medal – third place	2010 Bratislava	K1 team
Junior World Championships
Silver medal – second place	1996 Lipno	K1 team
Bronze medal – third place	1996 Lipno	K1
Junior European Championships
Silver medal – second place	1995 Liptovský Mikuláš	K1
Bronze medal – third place	1995 Liptovský Mikuláš	K1 team

Gabriela Stacherová (born 4 February 1980 in Zvolen) is a Slovak slalom canoeist who competed at the international level from 1995 to 2010, specializing in the K1 event.

== Biography ==
Stacherová won a silver medal in the K1 team event at the 2009 ICF Canoe Slalom World Championships in La Seu d'Urgell. At the European Championships, she won a total of seven medals in the K1 team event (two gold, four assists, and one bronze).

Stacherová competed in two Summer Olympics. She finished 11th on her debut in the K1 event at the 2000 Summer Olympics in Sydney. Four years later at the 2004 Summer Olympics in Athens, she finished tenth place in the K1 event. Stacherová recorded six World Cup podiums during her career, including her only victory in Bratislava in 2003.

== Career statistics ==
=== Major championships results timeline ===
Event		1996	1997	1998	1999	2000	2001	2002	2003	2004	2005	2006	2007	2008	2009	2010
Olympic Games	K1	—	Not held			11	Not held			10	Not held			—	Not held	
World Championships	K1	Not held	24	Not held	12	Not held		4	10	Not held	—	18	37	Not held	27	40
World Championships	K1 team	Not held	5	Not held	4	Not held		4	6	Not held	—	4	4	Not held	2	6
European Championships	K1	20	Not held	22	Not held	7	Not held	4	Not held	6	—	13	11	20	11	15
European Championships	K1 team	—	Not held	4	Not held	1	Not held	2	Not held	2 (Note: Not a medal event due to low number of participating nations)	—	1	2	2	2	3

=== World Cup individual podiums ===
Season	Date	Venue	Position	Event
2001	29 Jul 2001	Augsburg	3rd	K1
2002	26 May 2002	Guangzhou	2nd	K1
2003	11 May 2003	Penrith	3rd	K1
2003	31 Jul 2003	Bratislava	1st	K1
2006	28 May 2006	Athens	2nd	K1
2008	29 Jun 2008	Tacen	3rd	K1
