= Peter Nagy (canoeist) =

Slovak slalom canoeist (1964–2021)

Personal information
- Nickname: Faťko
- Nationality: Slovak
- Born: December 17, 1964 Bratislava, Czechoslovakia
- Died: December 3, 2021 (aged 56) Bratislava, Slovakia
- Height: 1.85 m (6 ft 1 in)
- Weight: 85 kg (187 lb)

Sport
- Country: Slovakia
- Sport: Canoe slalom
- Event: K1
Medal record
Men's canoe slalom
Representing Czechoslovakia
World Championships
Bronze medal – third place	1991 Tacen	K1 team

Peter Nagy (17 December 1964 – 3 December 2021) was a Slovak slalom canoeist who competed at the international level from 1990 to 2001, specializing in the K1 discipline.

He won a bronze medal for Czechoslovakia in the K1 team event at the 1991 ICF Canoe Slalom World Championships in Tacen.

Nagy competed in two Summer Olympics for Slovakia. He finished 13th in his Olympic debut in the K1 event at the 1996 games in Atlanta. He finished 12th in the K1 event fours years later in Sydney.

Nicknamed "Faťko", Nagy died in Bratislava in 2021, at age 56.

== Major championships results timeline ==
Representing Czechoslovakia from 1991 to 1992 and Slovakia from 1993 to 2000.

Event		1991	1992	1993	1994	1995	1996	1997	1998	1999	2000
Olympic Games	K1	Not held	—	Not held			13	Not held			12
World Championships	K1	45	Not held	24	Not held	12	Not held	15	Not held	24	Not held
World Championships	K1 team	3	Not held	10	Not held	8	Not held	6	Not held	4	Not held
European Championships	K1	Not held					19	Not held	30	Not held	34
European Championships	K1 team	Not held					4	Not held	5	Not held	5
