= Anton Vasilev =

Russian canoeist

Medal record

Men's canoe sprint

Representing Russia

World Championships
Gold medal – first place	2013 Duisburg	K–4 1000 m
Bronze medal – third place	2007 Duisburg	K-4 200 m
Bronze medal – third place	2011 Szeged	K-4 1000 m

Anton Vasilev (sometimes listed as Anton Vasilyev, born 13 October 1983) is a Russian sprint canoeist who has competed since the late 2000s. He won a gold medal in the K-4 1000 m event at the 2013 ICF Canoe Sprint World Championships in Duisburg and two bronze medals in the K-4 200 m event at the 2007 ICF Canoe Sprint World Championships in Duisburg and in the K-4 1000 m event at the 2011 ICF Canoe Sprint World Championships in Szeged.

Vasilev also finished eighth in the K-4 1000 m event at the 2008 Summer Olympics in Beijing.
