= 1997 European Junior Canoe Slalom Championships =

- Location: Nowy Sącz, Poland

The 1997 European Junior Canoe Slalom Championships were the 2nd edition of the European Junior Canoe Slalom Championships. The event took place in Nowy Sącz, Poland from 29 to 31 August 1997 under the auspices of the European Canoe Association (ECA). A total of 7 medal events took place. No medals were awarded for the men's C2 team event due to low number of participating countries.

== Medal summary ==
=== Men ===
==== Canoe ====
Event	Gold		Silver		Bronze	
C1	Michal Martikán (SVK)	217.61	Konrad Korzeniewski (POL)	231.08	Stanislav Gejdoš (SVK)	231.59
C1 team	Poland; Konrad Korzeniewski; Sławomir Mordarski; Andrzej Wójs	132.11	Germany; Achim Heib; Sebastian Steinhäuser; Stefan Pfannmöller	132.52	Slovenia; Janez Korenjak; Aljaž Hamberger; Primož Gabrijelčič	133.07
C2	Andrzej Wójs/Sławomir Mordarski (POL)	249.94	Peter Hochschorner/Pavol Hochschorner (SVK)	259.24	Martin Rasner/Jan Hošek (CZE)	260.10
C2 team (non-medal event)	Germany; Marcel Schmidt/Martin Schütze; Marcus Becker/Stefan Henze; Oliver Muschner/Patric Muschner	154.61	Poland; Dariusz Wrzosek/Krzysztof Bogatek; Piotr Janik/Tomasz Morawski; Maciej Danek/Roman Cebula	156.63	Czech Republic; Jaroslav Volf/Ondřej Štěpánek; Martin Rasner/Jan Hošek; Václav Čvančara/Ivan Hammer	180.43

==== Kayak ====
Event	Gold		Silver		Bronze	
K1	Floris Braat (NED)	215.72	Claus Suchanek (GER)	219.74	Tomáš Turček (SVK)	221.46
K1 team	Great Britain; James Hounslow; Alan Cardy; Thomas Paterson	124.32	Slovakia; Tomáš Turček; Peter Cibák; Tomáš Mráz	126.21	Slovenia; Dejan Širme; Uroš Škander; Miha Terdič	128.09

=== Women ===
==== Kayak ====
Event	Gold		Silver		Bronze	
K1	Laura Blakeman (GBR)	253.71	Hana Pešková (CZE)	259.86	Beata Grzesik (POL)	260.70
K1 team	Poland; Beata Grzesik; Agnieszka Stanuch; Izabela Szadkowska	147.45	Germany; Doreen Böhnisch; Claudia Bär; Jasmin Pitsch	151.66	France; Anne-Line Poncet; Samuelle Arnaud; Stéphanie Sohy	154.76

== Medal table ==
Rank	Nation	Gold	Silver	Bronze	Total
1	Poland (POL)	3	1	1	5
2	Great Britain (GBR)	2	0	0	2
3	Slovakia (SVK)	1	2	2	5
4	Netherlands (NED)	1	0	0	1
5	Germany (GER)	0	3	0	3
6	Czech Republic (CZE)	0	1	1	2
7	Slovenia (SLO)	0	0	2	2
8	France (FRA)	0	0	1	1
Totals (8 entries)		7	7	7	21
