= Canoeing at the 2000 Summer Olympics – Men's slalom K-1 =

These are the results of the men's K-1 slalom competition in canoeing at the 2000 Summer Olympics. The K-1 (kayak single) event is raced by one-man kayaks through a whitewater course. The venue for the 2000 Olympic competition was in Penrith.

== Medalists ==
Gold	Silver	Bronze
Thomas Schmidt (GER)	Paul Ratcliffe (GBR)	Pierpaolo Ferrazzi (ITA)

== Results ==
=== Qualifying ===
The 23 competitors each took two runs through the whitewater slalom course on 19 September. The combined score of both runs counted for the event with the top 15 advancing to the final round the following day.

Rank	Name	Nation	Run 1			Run 2			Result
Rank	Name	Nation	Time	Points	Total	Time	Points	Total	Total
1	Mathias Röthenmund	Switzerland	127.45	0	127.45	125.57	0	125.57	253.02
2	Thomas Schmidt	Germany	127.07	2	129.07	122.10	2	124.10	253.17
3	Paul Ratcliffe	Great Britain	126.59	0	126.59	123.10	4	127.10	253.69
4	Helmut Oblinger	Austria	125.94	0	125.94	128.00	0	128.00	253.94
5	Scott Shipley	United States	126.80	2	128.80	126.02	0	126.02	254.82
6	Tomáš Kobes	Czech Republic	126.72	2	128.72	124.41	2	126.41	255.13
7	Manuel Köhler	Austria	128.34	0	128.34	127.45	0	127.45	255.79
8	Laurent Burtz	France	128.15	0	128.15	127.32	2	129.32	257.47
9	Fedja Marušič	Slovenia	126.81	2	128.81	129.29	0	129.29	258.10
10	Dejan Kralj	Slovenia	130.24	0	130.24	128.05	0	128.05	258.29
11	Pierpaolo Ferrazzi	Italy	125.59	2	127.59	131.60	2	133.60	261.19
12	Peter Nagy	Slovakia	129.48	0	129.48	132.68	0	132.68	262.16
13	Enrico Lazzarotto	Italy	135.18	0	135.18	125.04	2	127.04	262.22
14	Jiří Prskavec	Czech Republic	128.26	4	132.26	128.75	2	130.75	263.01
15	Andrej Glucks	Croatia	128.76	0	128.76	130.90	4	134.90	263.66
16	Ian Wiley	Ireland	133.66	2	135.66	128.76	2	130.76	266.42
17	Lazar Popovski	Macedonia	132.23	0	132.23	130.37	4	134.37	266.60
18	Esteban Aracama	Spain	131.33	2	133.33	132.42	2	134.42	267.75
19	Carles Juanmartí	Spain	131.80	2	133.80	134.08	8	142.08	275.88
20	Nizar Samlal	Morocco	148.02	6	154.02	145.20	0	145.20	299.22
21	John Wilkie	Australia	134.44	6	140.44	128.40	52	180.42	320.84
22	David Ford	Canada	143.02	4	147.02	126.56	50	176.56	323.58
23	Taro Ando	Japan	150.69	60	210.69	177.54	54	231.95	442.54

=== Final ===
15 competitors each took two runs through the whitewater slalom course on 20 September. The combined result of both runs counted for the event.

Rank	Name	Nation	Run 1			Run 2			Result
Rank	Name	Nation	Time	Points	Total	Time	Points	Total	Total
1st place, gold medalist(s)	Thomas Schmidt	Germany	108.64	0	108.64	108.61	0	108.61	217.25
2nd place, silver medalist(s)	Paul Ratcliffe	Great Britain	110.22	2	112.22	109.49	2	111.49	223.71
3rd place, bronze medalist(s)	Pierpaolo Ferrazzi	Italy	111.79	0	111.79	113.24	0	113.24	225.03
4	Helmut Oblinger	Austria	112.58	0	112.58	111.87	2	113.87	226.45
5	Scott Shipley	United States	110.99	2	112.99	113.68	0	113.68	226.67
6	Manuel Köhler	Austria	113.06	2	115.06	111.74	0	111.74	226.80
7	Tomáš Kobes	Czech Republic	112.23	2	114.23	112.76	0	112.76	226.99
8	Laurent Burtz	France	112.64	0	112.64	110.90	4	114.90	227.63
9	Mathias Röthenmund	Switzerland	114.92	0	114.92	113.04	0	113.04	227.92
10	Dejan Kralj	Slovenia	116.60	0	116.60	111.48	0	111.48	228.08
11	Andrej Glucks	Croatia	115.16	0	115.16	115.06	0	115.06	230.22
12	Peter Nagy	Slovakia	117.66	0	117.66	116.37	0	116.37	234.03
13	Jiří Prskavec	Czech Republic	121.82	0	121.82	112.84	0	112.84	234.66
14	Enrico Lazzarotto	Italy	118.89	2	120.89	115.03	0	115.03	235.92
15	Fedja Marušič	Slovenia	114.62	0	114.62	113.37	54	167.37	281.99
