= Robert Bouten =

Dutch slalom canoer (born 1984)

Robert Bouten (born 8 November 1984 in Oss) is a Dutch slalom canoer who has competed since the early 2000s. He finished ninth in the K-1 event at the 2008 Summer Olympics in Beijing.
