= Ding Fuxue =

Chinese slalom canoeist

Personal information
- Native name: 丁富学
- Nationality: Chinese
- Born: 23 May 1980 (age 46) Yuqing county, Guizhou
- Height: 1.76 m (5 ft 9 in)
- Weight: 73 kg (161 lb)

Sport
- Country: China
- Sport: Canoe slalom
- Event: K1

Ding Fuxue
- Traditional Chinese: 丁富學
- Simplified Chinese: 丁富学
Transcriptions
Standard Mandarin
- Hanyu Pinyin: Dīng Fù Xué

Ding Fuxue (born May 23, 1980 in Yuqing County) is a Chinese slalom canoeist who competed in the 2000s. He was eliminated in the qualifying round of the K1 event at the 2008 Summer Olympics in Beijing, finishing in 21st place.

== World Cup individual podiums ==
Season	Date	Venue	Position	Event
2006	27 Aug 2006	Zhangjiajie	1st	K1^{1}

^{1} Asia Canoe Slalom Championship counting for World Cup points
