= Artur Litvinchuk =

Belarusian canoeist

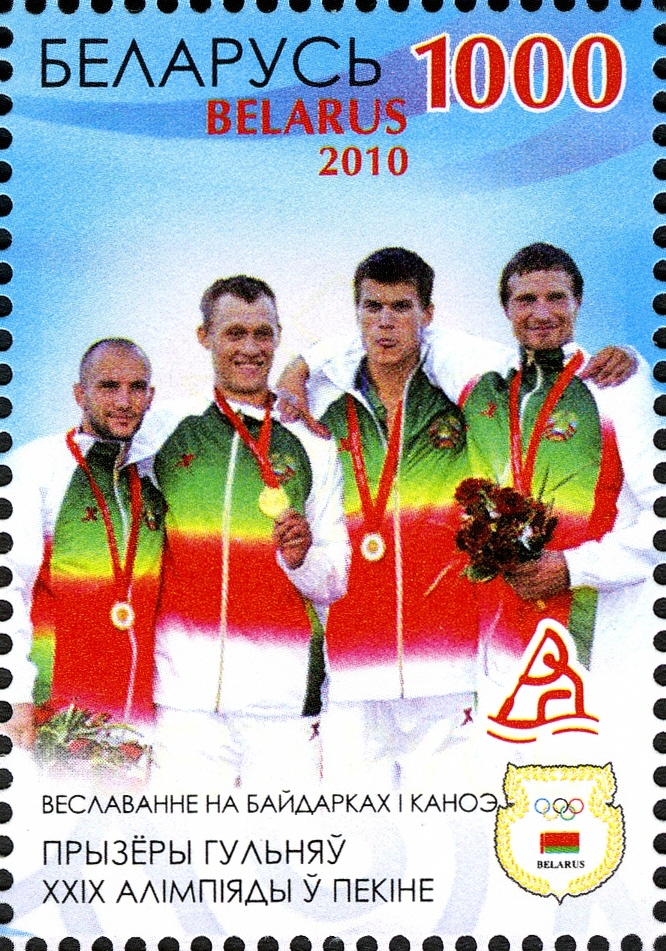
- Beijing K-4 1000 m team on a 2010 Belarusian stamp: Abalmasau, Piatrushenka, Litvinchuk and Makhneu

Personal information
- Born: 4 January 1988 (age 38) Mazyr, Belarus
- Height: 1.89 m (6 ft 2 in)
- Weight: 83 kg (183 lb)

Sport
- Sport: Canoe sprint
- Club: Dynamo Homel
Medal record
Representing Belarus
Olympic Games
Gold medal – first place	2008 Beijing	K-4 1000 m
World Championships
Gold medal – first place	2009 Dartmouth	K-4 1000 m
Silver medal – second place	2010 Poznań	K-4 1000 m

Artur Siarheyevich Litvinchuk (Belarusian: Артур Сяргеевiч Літвінчук; born 4 January 1988) is a Belarusian sprint canoeist who has competed since the late 2000s. He won the gold medal in the K-4 1000 m event at the 2008 Summer Olympics in Beijing.

Litvinchuck also won two medals in the K-4 1000 m event at the ICF Canoe Sprint World Championships with a gold in 2009 and a silver in 2010. He is married to the Belarusian canoeist Maryna Litvinchuk. They have a child born in January 2018.
