= Gary Crossan =

Irish long-distance runner

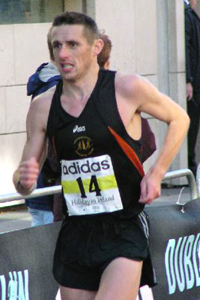

Personal information
- Born: 20 October 1971 (age 54) Donegal

Sport
- Country: Ireland
- Club: Letterkenny AC

Gary Crossan (born 20 October 1971) was a long-distance runner. He was born in Letterkenny, County Donegal, Ireland. He was educated at St Eunan's College, Letterkenny and finished college running career at Florida Southern College. He is also a member of the Letterkenny Athletic Club. Irish olympian Eoin Rheinisch is his cousin.

== Achievements ==
Crossan has been Irish National Marathon Champion for four consecutive years. In 2002 he was the top Irish finisher at the 2002 Dublin Marathon clocking up a time of 2:20:16 and the National Marathon Champion in Belfast with a time of 2:24:20. He was the top Irish finisher at the 2003 Dublin Marathon, finishing 6th overall in a time of 2:20:27 , and continued his championship tally with times of 2:24:07 in 2004 and 2:23:19 in 2005 . He has also been Irish National Half-Marathon Champion. He won the Newry Marathon in 2008. Gary Crossan won the Gael Force North challenge on 4 June 2011.Garry Crossan also helps with schools in Ireland to do athletics
