= Franco Benedini =

Italian sprint canoer

Medal record

Men's canoe sprint

World Championships
Bronze medal – third place	2005 Zagreb	K-4 500 m

Franco Benedini (born 7 June 1978) is an Italian sprint canoer who has competed since the mid-2000s. He won a bronze medal in the K-4 500 m at the 2005 ICF Canoe Sprint World Championships in Zagreb.

Benedini also finished fourth in the K-4 1000 m event at the 2008 Summer Olympics in Beijing.
