= Dušan Ovčarík =

Slovak slalom canoeist (born 1978)

Personal information
- Nationality: Slovak
- Born: 14 January 1978 (age 48) Liptovský Mikuláš, Czechoslovakia
- Years active: 1994 - 2004

Sport
- Country: Slovakia
- Sport: Canoe slalom
- Event: C1
Medal record
Men's canoe slalom
Representing Slovakia
European Championships
| Gold medal – first place | 2000 Mezzana | C1 team |
| Silver medal – second place | 2004 Skopje | C1 team |
Junior World Championships
| Silver medal – second place | 1996 Lipno | C1 team |
Junior European Championships
| Gold medal – first place | 1995 Liptovský Mikuláš | C1 team |

Dušan Ovčarík (born 14 January 1978) is a retired Slovak slalom canoeist who competed at the international level from 1994 to 2004, specializing in the C1 discipline.

He won two medals in the C1 team event at the European Championships, with a gold in 2000 in Mezzana and a silver in 2004 in Skopje. He competed in three World Championships, earning his best result of 5th in the C1 event in 2002 in Bourg Saint Maurice.

== Major championships results timeline ==
| Event | | 1997 | 1998 | 1999 | 2000 | 2001 | 2002 | 2003 | 2004 |
|---|---|---|---|---|---|---|---|---|---|
| World Championships | C1 | 18 | Not held | 54 | Not held | | 5 | — | Not held |
| World Championships | C1 team | — | Not held | 6 | Not held | | — | — | Not held |
| European Championships | C1 | Not held | — | Not held | 5 | Not held | 17 | Not held | 24 |
| European Championships | C1 team | Not held | — | Not held | 1 | Not held | 11 | Not held | 2 |
