= Beata Grzesik =

Polish canoeist

Medal record

Women's canoe slalom

Representing Poland

World Championships
Silver medal – second place	1999 La Seu d'Urgell	K1

Junior European Championships
Gold medal – first place	1997 Nowy Sącz	K1 team
Bronze medal – third place	1997 Nowy Sącz	K1

Beata Jolanta Grzesik (born 11 June 1979, in Nowy Sącz) is a Polish slalom canoeist who competed at the international level from 1995 to 2000.

She won a silver medal in the K1 event at the 1999 ICF Canoe Slalom World Championships in La Seu d'Urgell. Grzesik also competed in the K1 event at the 2000 Summer Olympics in Sydney where she finished in 19th place after being eliminated in the qualifying round.
