= Tony Schumacher (canoeist) =

Australian canoeist

Tony Schumacher (born 19 November 1976) is an Australian sprint kayaker who competed in the early 2000s. At the 2008 Summer Olympics in Beijing, he was surprisingly eliminated in the semifinals of the K-4 1000 m event after entering the event as gold medal favourites.
