= Marie Gaspard =

French canoeist

Medal record

Women's canoe slalom

Representing France

World Championships
Gold medal – first place	2006 Prague	K1 team

European Championships
Bronze medal – third place	2006 L'Argentière-la-Bessée	K1 team

Junior World Championships
Bronze medal – third place	1996 Lipno	K1 team

Junior European Championships
Gold medal – first place	1995 Liptovský Mikuláš	K1 team

Marie Gaspard (born 1978) is a French slalom canoeist who competed at the international level from 1995 to 2006.

== Career ==
Gaspard won a gold medal in the K1 team event at the 2006 ICF Canoe Slalom World Championships in Prague. She also won a bronze medal in the same event at the 2006 European Championships in L'Argentière-la-Bessée.
