= Letterkenny Athletic Club =

Irish athletic club to whom many Olympians belong

- Founded: 1972
- Ground: Aura Complex, Letterkenny, County Donegal, Ireland

Letterkenny Athletic Club (LAC) is an Irish athletic club, which has produced several Olympians. Based at Aura Sports Complex in Letterkenny, County Donegal, it has a Tartan 400m running track.

== History ==
Letterkenny Athletic Club was formed in 1972. It has evolved into one of the largest athletics clubs in the North-West with a current membership of over 150 juvenile and 100 senior athletes.

LAC takes part in cross-country, road running and track and field competitions. Over the years, the club has had successes at all levels of competition.

== Notable members ==
- Gary Crossan — marathon runner
- Mark English — middle-distance runner; Olympian
- Danny McDaid — marathon runner; Olympian
- Danny Mooney — middle-distance runner; competed at the 2014 Commonwealth Games
- Caolan Ward — Gaelic footballer
