= Thomas Mosimann =

Swiss canoeist

Medal record

Men's canoe slalom

Representing Switzerland

World Championships
Gold medal – first place	2003 Augsburg	K1 team

European Championships
Gold medal – first place	2004 Skopje	K1 team

Junior World Championships
Silver medal – second place	1998 Lofer	K1 team

Thomas Mosimann (born 1980) is a Swiss slalom canoeist who competed at the international level from 1998 to 2005.

He won a gold medal in the K1 team event at the 2003 ICF Canoe Slalom World Championships in Augsburg. He also won gold in the same event at the 2004 European Championships in Skopje.
