= John Wilkie (canoeist) =

Australian slalom canoeist (born 1977)

John Wilkie (born 24 March 1977 in Murwillumbah) is an Australian slalom canoeist who competed from the mid-1990s to the mid-2000s. He finished in 21st place in the K1 event at the 2000 Summer Olympics in Sydney after being eliminated in the qualifying round.

== World Cup individual podiums ==
Season	Date	Venue	Position	Event
2005	30 January 2005	Mangahao	2nd	K1^{1}

^{1} Continental Cup Oceania counting for World Cup points
