= Pablo McCandless =

Chilean canoeist (born 1982)

Pablo McCandless Elton (born March 2, 1982, in Washington, D.C.) is an American-born Chilean slalom canoer who competed in the 2000s. He was eliminated in the qualifying round of the K-1 event at the 2008 Summer Olympics in Beijing, finishing in 16th place.
