= Sławomir Mordarski =

Polish canoeist

Medal record

Men's canoe slalom

Representing Poland

World Championships
Gold medal – first place	1999 La Seu d'Urgell	C1 team
Bronze medal – third place	2002 Bourg St.-Maurice	C2 team
Bronze medal – third place	2003 Augsburg	C2 team

European Championships
Silver medal – second place	1996 Augsburg	C2 team

Junior World Championships
Silver medal – second place	1996 Lipno	C2 team

Junior European Championships
Gold medal – first place	1995 Liptovský Mikuláš	C2
Gold medal – first place	1997 Nowy Sącz	C2
Gold medal – first place	1997 Nowy Sącz	C1 team
Silver medal – second place	1995 Liptovský Mikuláš	C2 team

Sławomir Mordarski (born 4 January 1979 in Nowy Sącz) is a Polish slalom canoeist who competed at the international level from 1994 to 2006.

He won three medals at the ICF Canoe Slalom World Championships with a gold (C1 team: 1999) and two bronzes (C2 team: 2002, 2003). He also won a silver medal in the C2 team event at the 1996 European Championships in Augsburg. Mordaski also competed in two Summer Olympics, earning his best finish of sixth in the C2 event in Sydney in 2000.

His partner in the C2 boat for most of his active career was Andrzej Wójs (1995-2005). He was also partnered by Marcin Pochwała (2006).

His older brother Ryszard is also an Olympic slalom canoeist.

== World Cup individual podiums ==
Season	Date	Venue	Position	Event
2000	2 Jul 2000	Saint-Pé-de-Bigorre	2nd	C2
2001	10 Jun 2001	Tacen	1st	C2
2001	28 Jul 2001	Augsburg	1st	C2
2001	5 Aug 2001	Prague	1st	C2
