= David Backhouse =

Dutch slalom canoeist (born 1981)

Medal record

Men's canoe slalom

Representing Netherlands

World Championships
Silver medal – second place	2003 Augsburg	K-1 team

David Backhouse (born 23 October 1981) is a Dutch slalom canoeist who competed from the late 1990s to the late 2000s. He won a silver medal in the K-1 team event at the 2003 ICF Canoe Slalom World Championships in Augsburg.
