= Mathias Röthenmund =

Swiss slalom canoeist (born 1974)

Medal record

Men's canoe slalom

Representing Switzerland

World Championships
Gold medal – first place	2003 Augsburg	K1 team

European Championships
Gold medal – first place	2004 Skopje	K1 team
Silver medal – second place	2004 Skopje	K1
Bronze medal – third place	2000 Mezzana	K1 team
Bronze medal – third place	2008 Kraków	K1 team

Mathias Röthenmund (born 22 October 1974) is a Swiss slalom canoeist who competed in the 1990s and 2000s.

He won the gold medal in the K1 team event at the 2003 ICF Canoe Slalom World Championships in Augsburg. He also won 4 medals at the European Championships (1 gold, 1 silver and 2 bronzes). Röthenmund also finished ninth in the K1 event at the 2000 Summer Olympics in Sydney.

Former American slalom canoeist Cathy Hearn is his sister-in-law.

== World Cup individual podiums ==
Season	Date	Venue	Position	Event
2000	23 Jul 2000	Prague	3rd	K1
