= Ryszard Mordarski =

Polish canoeist

Ryszard Marek Mordarski (born 27 March 1976 in Nowy Sącz) is a Polish slalom canoeist who competed at the international level from 1993 to 1997.

He finished eighth in the C1 event at the 1996 Summer Olympics in Atlanta.

His younger brother Sławomir also represented Poland in canoe slalom.
