= Alexandros Dimitriou =

French-born, Greek slalom canoer (born 1980)

Alexandros Dimitriou (born 15 December 1980) is a French-born, Greek slalom canoer who competed in the 2000s. At the 2004 Summer Olympics in Athens, he finished twenty-fourth in the qualification round for the K-1 event. He did not progress to the semifinals.
