= Ivan Pišvejc =

Czech slalom canoeist (born 1978)

Medal record

Men's canoe slalom

Representing Czech Republic

World Championships
Gold medal – first place	2009 La Seu d'Urgell	K1 team
Bronze medal – third place	2002 Bourg St.-Maurice	K1
Bronze medal – third place	2007 Foz do Iguaçu	K1 team

European Championships
Silver medal – second place	2002 Bratislava	K1 team
Bronze medal – third place	2004 Skopje	K1 team

Junior World Championships
Gold medal – first place	1996 Lipno	K1 team
Bronze medal – third place	1996 Lipno	K1

Junior European Championships
Gold medal – first place	1995 Liptovský Mikuláš	K1
Gold medal – first place	1995 Liptovský Mikuláš	K1 team

Ivan Pišvejc (born 1978) is a Czech slalom canoeist who competed at the international level from 1994 to 2010.

He won three medals at the ICF Canoe Slalom World Championships with a gold (K1 team: 2009) and two bronzes (K1: 2002, K1 team: 2007). He also won a silver and a bronze in the K1 team event at the European Championships.

== World Cup individual podiums ==
Season	Date	Venue	Position	Event
2004	11 Jul 2004	Prague	3rd	K1
2004	17 Jul 2004	Augsburg	2nd	K1
2007	1 Jul 2007	Prague	3rd	K1
