= Uroš Kodelja =

Slovenian canoeist

Medal record

Men's canoe slalom

Representing Slovenia

European Championships
Bronze medal – third place	1998 Roudnice nad Labem	K1 team

Junior World Championships
Gold medal – first place	1992 Sjoa	K1 team

Uroš Kodelja (born 15 August 1974 in Nova Gorica) is a Slovenian slalom canoeist who competed at the international level from 1992 to 2007.

Kodelja won a bronze medal in the K1 team event at the 1998 European Championships in Roudnice nad Labem. He also finished tenth in the K1 event at the 2004 Summer Olympics in Athens.
