= Kyle Elliott =

Canadian scientist

Kyle Elliott is a Canadian ornithologist and an assistant professor in the Department of Natural Resource Sciences at McGill University in Montréal, Canada. He is the current Canada Research Chair in Arctic Ecology.

== Early life and education ==
Elliott completed two Bachelor of Science degrees, one in physics and mathematics and the other in conservation biology, at the University of British Columbia. This was followed by studies at the University of Manitoba, which lead to a Master of Science and finally a Doctor of Philosophy in 2014. He then completed a NSERC-funded post-doctoral research fellowship at the University of Western Ontario and the University of Guelph.

== Honours ==
Kyle was awarded the Ned K. Johnson Young Investigator Award from the American Ornithologists Union in 2015.
