= Guillermo Díez-Canedo =

Spanish canoeist

Medal record

Men's canoe slalom

Representing Spain

World Championships
Bronze medal – third place	2009 La Seu d'Urgell	K-1 team

Guillermo Díez-Canedo Fernández (born 11 November 1982 in Madrid) is a Spanish slalom canoeist who has competed since the late 1990s.

He won a bronze medal in the K-1 team event at the 2009 ICF Canoe Slalom World Championships in La Seu d'Urgell. At the 2008 Summer Olympics in Beijing, he was eliminated in the semifinals of the K-1 event.

== Bibliography ==
- Sports-Reference.com profile
- Overview of athlete's results at canoeslalom.net
