= Slaven Dizdarević =

Slovak decathlete

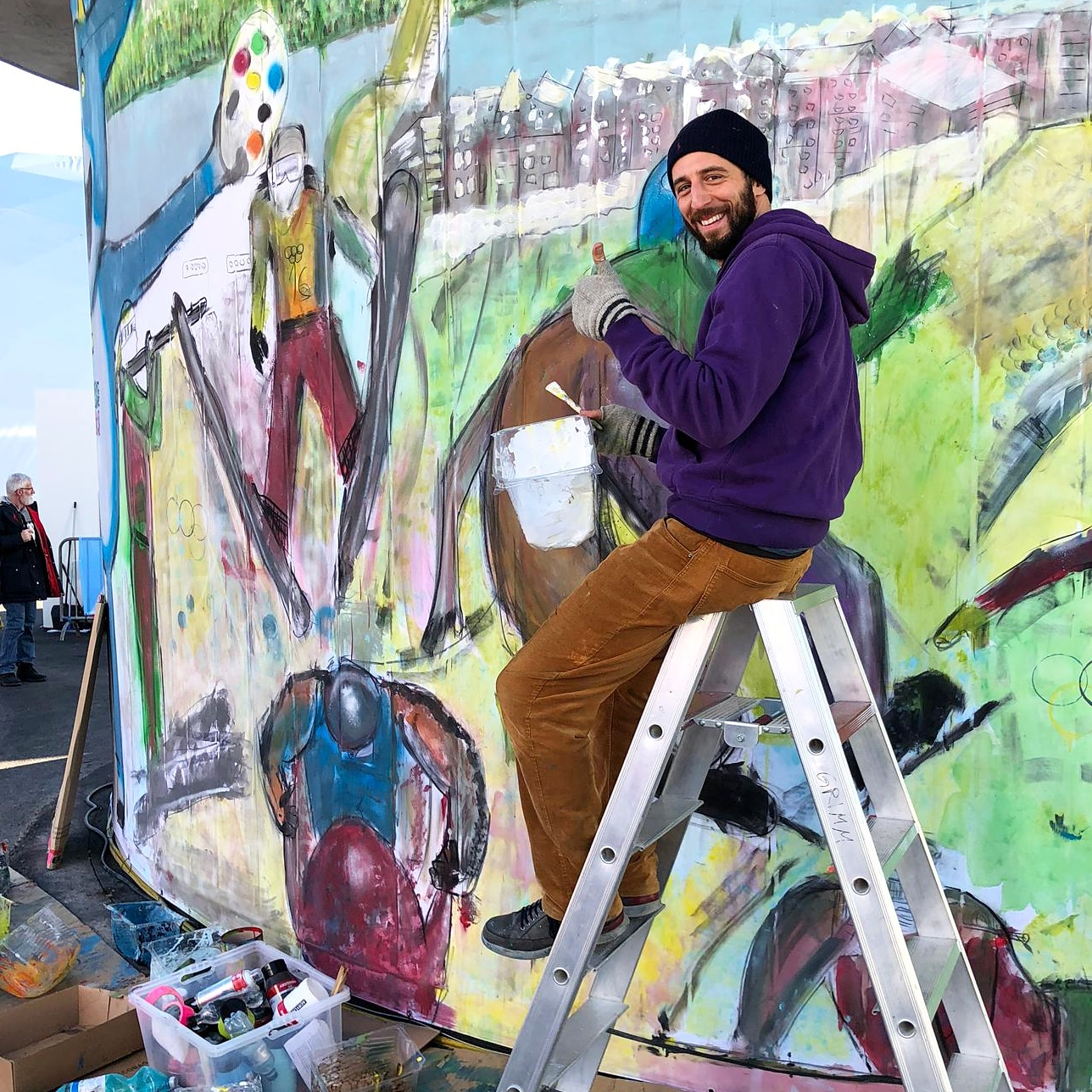
Project Painted "by" was first time introduced by Slaven during the Winter Youth Olympic Games in Lausanne 2020

Slaven Dizdarević (born 3 August 1981 Sarajevo, Yugoslavia) is a decathlete who has represented Slovakia at the 2008 Summer Olympics in Beijing. He holds the national record in the heptathlon. After the sports career Slaven found his passion in art as a painter and photographer.
