= Eoin Rheinisch =

Irish slalom canoeist

Personal information
- Nickname: Rhino
- Nationality: Irish
- Born: 21 February 1980 (age 45); Leixlip, Ireland

Sport
- Country: Ireland
- Sport: Canoe slalom
- Event: K1
- Retired: 2013

Achievements and titles
- Olympic finals: 2004 K1, 21st; 2008 K1, 4th; 2012 K1, 14th

Eoin Rheinisch (born 21 February 1980 in Dublin) is an Irish slalom canoeist and three-time Olympic competitor. He competed at the international level from 1996 to 2013.

He is from Leixlip, County Kildare.

== Olympic record ==
Rheinisch competed at the Summer Olympic Games in 2004, 2008 and 2012.

He competed in the 2004 Olympic K1 event where he finished 21st of 25 overall, exiting the competition after the heats.

He came fourth in the 2008 Olympics K1 event. His performance in the Olympic Final was the best ever achievement by an Irish competitor in this event. Previously Ian Wiley finished fifth in the same event at the Atlanta Olympics.

Rheinisch competed at the 2012 Summer Olympics in London and qualified for the semifinals of the K1 event, but failed to make it to the finals after incurring a 50-second penalty for missing an upstream gate. He finished in 14th place.

== World Cup individual podiums ==
Season	Date	Venue	Position	Event
2004	23 May 2004	La Seu d'Urgell	1st	K1

== Family ==
Irish marathon champion Gary Crossan is his cousin.

== Involvement in Gaelic games ==
During his short spell as senior Westmeath county football team manager, Brendan Hackett appointed Rheinisch as a member of his backroom team in 2009 to assist with "physical preparations".
