= Yuqing County =

Yuqing County 余庆县 Yuking; Yüking
- County
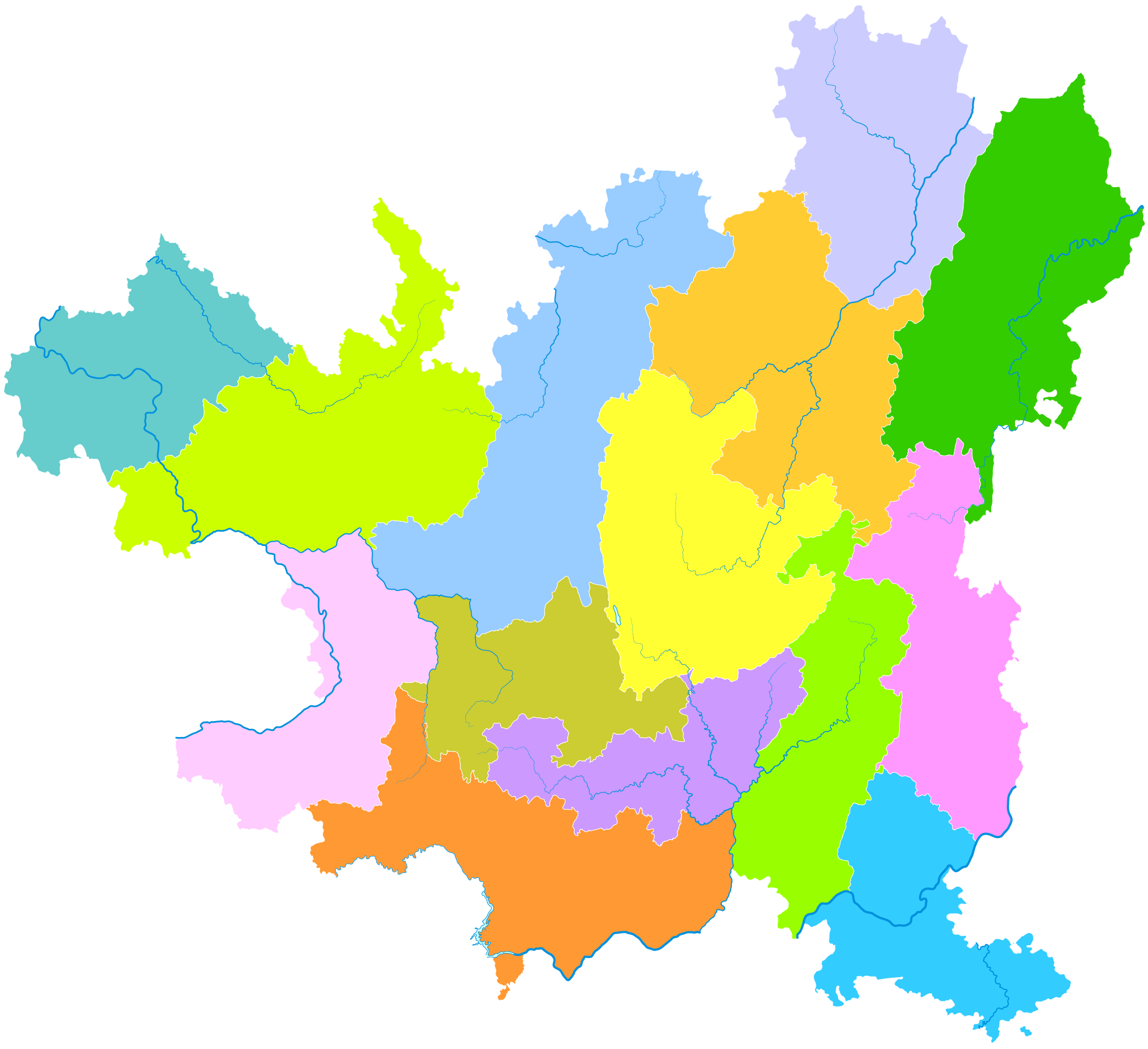
- Yuqing is the division at the southeastern corner of this map of Zunyi

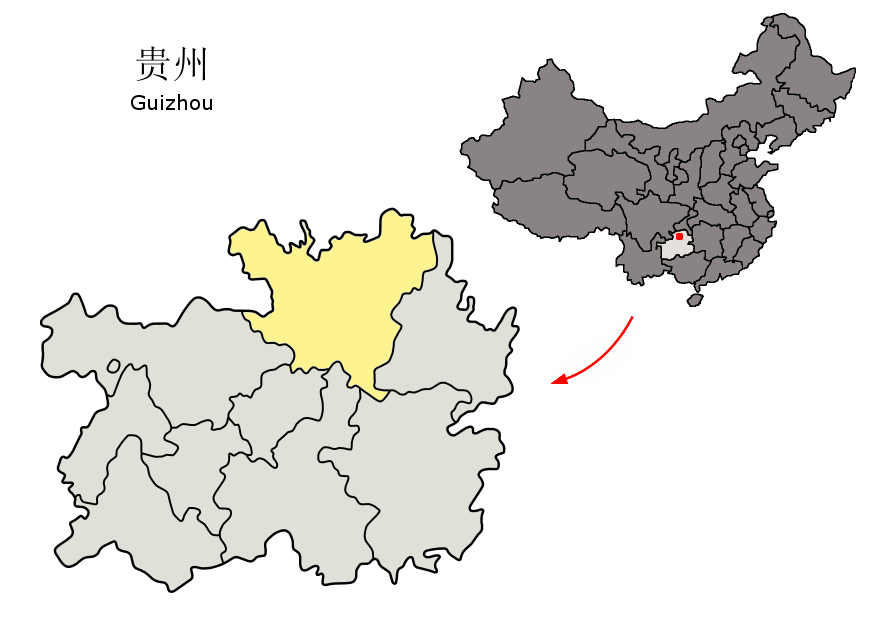
- Zunyi in Guizhou
- Coordinates: 27°12′54″N 107°54′22″E
- Country: China
- Province: Guizhou
- Prefecture-level city: Zunyi
- County seat: Ziying

Area
  - Total: 1,623.67 km^{2} (626.90 sq mi)

Population (2020)
  - Total: 223,952
  - Density: 137.930/km^{2} (357.236/sq mi)
- Time zone: UTC+8 (China Standard)

Yuqing County (simplified Chinese: 余庆县; traditional Chinese: 餘慶縣; pinyin: Yúqìng Xiàn) is a county in the northeast of Guizhou province, China. It is under the administration of the prefecture-level city of Zunyi.

== Administrative divisions ==
Yuqing County is divided into 1 subdistrict, 8 towns and 1 ethnic township:

subdistricts

- Ziying Subdistrict 子营街道

towns

- Baini Town 白泥镇
- Longxi Town 龙溪镇
- Goupitan Town 构皮滩镇
- Dawujiang Town 大乌江镇
- Aoxi Town 敖溪镇
- Longjia Town 龙家镇
- Songyan Town 松烟镇
- Guanxing Town 关兴镇

ethnic township

- Huashan Miao Ethnic Township 花山苗族乡

== Climate ==
Climate data for Yuqing, elevation 622 m (2,041 ft), (1991–2020 normals, extremes 1981–present)
Month	Jan	Feb	Mar	Apr	May	Jun	Jul	Aug	Sep	Oct	Nov	Dec	Year
Record high °C (°F)	24.7 (76.5)	33.0 (91.4)	35.3 (95.5)	34.5 (94.1)	36.0 (96.8)	35.6 (96.1)	38.1 (100.6)	37.7 (99.9)	37.0 (98.6)	32.9 (91.2)	28.9 (84.0)	24.6 (76.3)	38.1 (100.6)
Mean daily maximum °C (°F)	8.9 (48.0)	12.1 (53.8)	16.7 (62.1)	22.5 (72.5)	26.1 (79.0)	28.4 (83.1)	31.1 (88.0)	31.4 (88.5)	27.9 (82.2)	22.0 (71.6)	17.4 (63.3)	11.5 (52.7)	21.3 (70.4)
Daily mean °C (°F)	5.5 (41.9)	8.0 (46.4)	11.9 (53.4)	17.1 (62.8)	20.8 (69.4)	23.8 (74.8)	25.9 (78.6)	25.5 (77.9)	22.2 (72.0)	17.3 (63.1)	12.7 (54.9)	7.5 (45.5)	16.5 (61.7)
Mean daily minimum °C (°F)	3.3 (37.9)	5.2 (41.4)	8.7 (47.7)	13.5 (56.3)	17.2 (63.0)	20.6 (69.1)	22.3 (72.1)	21.6 (70.9)	18.6 (65.5)	14.3 (57.7)	9.7 (49.5)	4.9 (40.8)	13.3 (56.0)
Record low °C (°F)	−4.1 (24.6)	−4.5 (23.9)	−4.8 (23.4)	3.3 (37.9)	6.7 (44.1)	13.0 (55.4)	14.6 (58.3)	14.8 (58.6)	10.5 (50.9)	4.6 (40.3)	−1.4 (29.5)	−4.9 (23.2)	−4.9 (23.2)
Average precipitation mm (inches)	27.3 (1.07)	28.7 (1.13)	56.0 (2.20)	105.5 (4.15)	178.2 (7.02)	191.4 (7.54)	162.4 (6.39)	120.4 (4.74)	92.0 (3.62)	89.6 (3.53)	43.8 (1.72)	23.7 (0.93)	1,119 (44.04)
Average precipitation days (≥ 0.1 mm)	13.3	12.0	15.3	16.3	17.4	16.3	13.5	12.8	10.7	14.4	11.0	10.3	163.3
Average snowy days	3.0	1.3	0.3	0	0	0	0	0	0	0	0.1	1.1	5.8
Average relative humidity (%)	79	76	78	78	79	82	79	78	78	81	79	77	79
Mean monthly sunshine hours	27.6	40.1	60.9	81.2	96.0	88.1	153.4	167.0	115.3	72.5	64.4	45.3	1,011.8
Percentage possible sunshine	8	13	16	21	23	21	36	42	31	21	20	14	22
Source: China Meteorological Administration
