= Nizar Samlal =

Moroccan slalom canoer (born 1979)

Nizar Samlal (born May 16, 1979) is a Moroccan slalom canoer who competed from the late 1990s to the mid-2000s. He finished in 20th place in the K-1 event at the 2000 Summer Olympics in Sydney after being eliminated in the qualifying round.
