= Björn Goldschmidt =

German canoeist (born 1979)

Medal record

Men's canoe sprint

Olympic Games
| Bronze medal – third place | 2008 Beijing | K-4 1000 m |

World Championships
| Gold medal – first place | 2007 Duisburg | K-4 1000 m |
| Silver medal – second place | 2005 Zagreb | K-4 200 m |

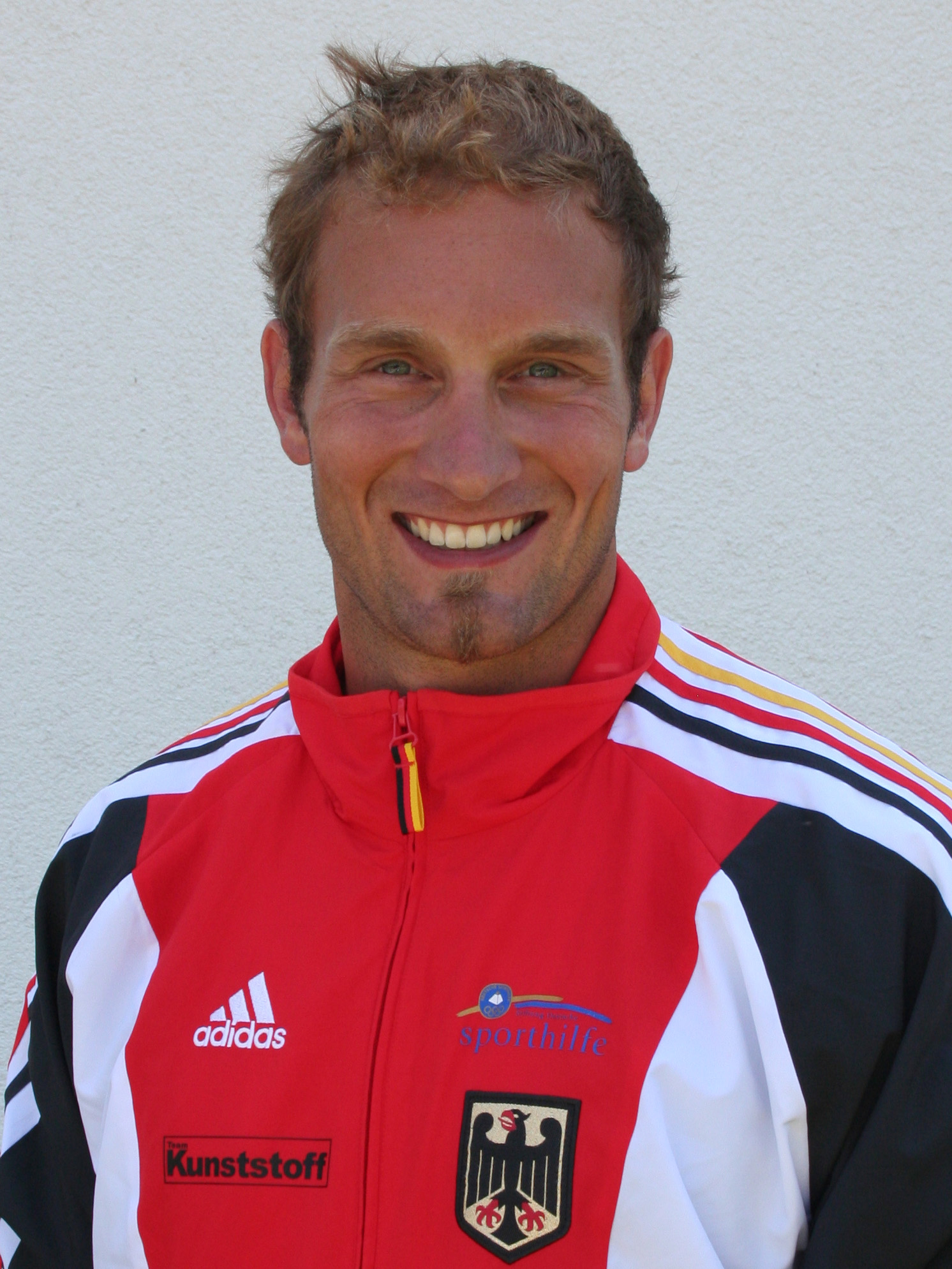
A picture of Björn Goldschmidt Olympic Bronze medalist Worldchampion Canoe Sprint

Björn Goldschmidt (born 3 December 1979 in Karlsruhe) is a German sprint canoer who has competed since the early 2000s. Competing in two Summer Olympics, he won a bronze medal in the K-4 1000 m event at Beijing in 2008.

Goldschmidt also won two medals at the ICF Canoe Sprint World Championships with a gold (K-4 200 m: 2007) and a silver (K-4 200 m: 2005).
