= Torsten Eckbrett =

German sprint canoer

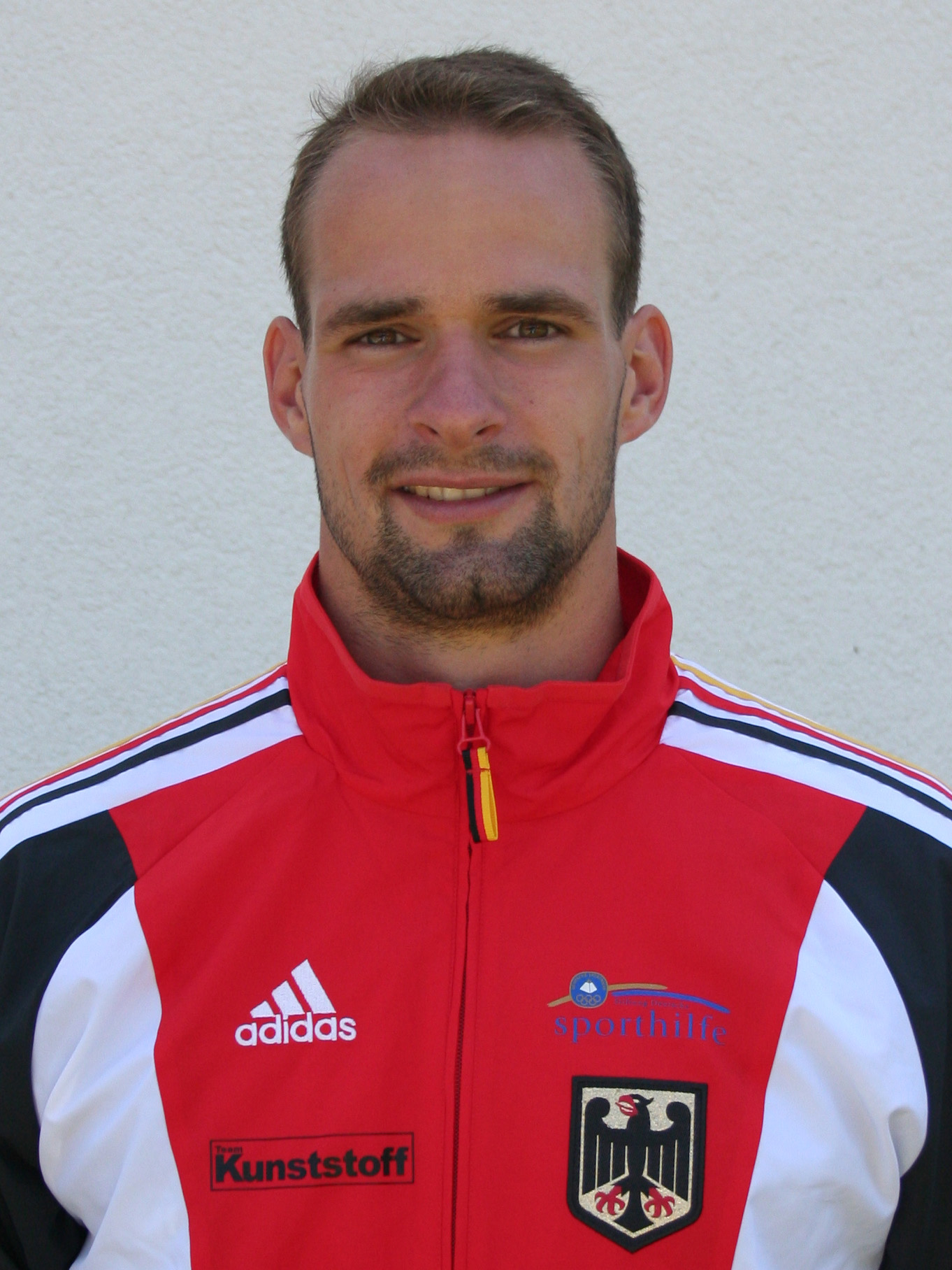
- Torsten Eckbrett (2008)

Medal record

Men's canoe sprint
Bronze medal – third place	2008 Beijing	K-4 1000 m

Torsten Eckbrett (born 13 April 1984 in Potsdam) is a German sprint canoeist who has competed since the late 2000s. He won a bronze medal in the K-4 1000 m event at the 2008 Summer Olympics in Beijing.
