= Dinko Mulić =

Croatian canoeist

Dinko Mulić (born 8 September 1983 in Bihać, Bosnia and Herzegovina) is a Bosnian-born Croatian slalom canoer who has competed since the late 1990s. Until 2003 he represented Bosnia and Herzegovina. Competing in the 2004 Summer Olympics in Athens in the K-1 event, he finished twenty-second in the qualification round, failing to progress to the semifinals. He recorded the same result in the K-1 event at the 2012 Summer Olympics in London.
