= Richard Riszdorfer =

Slovak sprint canoer (born 1981)

Medal record

Men's canoe sprint

Representing Slovakia

Olympic Games
Silver medal – second place	2008 Beijing	K-4 1000 m
Bronze medal – third place	2004 Athens	K-4 1000 m

World Championships
Gold medal – first place	2002 Seville	K-4 500 m
Gold medal – first place	2002 Seville	K-4 1000 m
Gold medal – first place	2003 Gainesville	K-4 500 m
Gold medal – first place	2003 Gainesville	K-4 1000 m
Gold medal – first place	2006 Szeged	K-4 500 m
Gold medal – first place	2007 Duisburg	K-4 500 m
Silver medal – second place	2005 Zagreb	K-4 1000 m
Silver medal – second place	2009 Dartmouth	K-4 200 m
Bronze medal – third place	2001 Poznań	K-4 500 m
Bronze medal – third place	2007 Duisburg	K-4 1000 m
Bronze medal – third place	2009 Dartmouth	K-4 1000 m

Richard Riszdorfer (Hungarian: Riszdorfer Richárd Hungarian pronunciation: [ˈrizdorfɛr ˈrihaːrd]; born 17 March 1981 in Komárno) is a Slovak canoe sprinter who has competed since the late 1990s. Competing in three Summer Olympics, he won two medals in the K-4 1000 m event with a silver in 2008 and a bronze in 2004.

Riszdorfer has also won eleven medals at the ICF Canoe Sprint World Championships with six golds (K-4 500 m: 2002, 2003, 2006, 2007; K-4 1000 m: 2002, 2003), two silvers (K-4 200 m: 2009, K-4 1000 m: 2005), and three bronzes (K-4 500 m: 2001, K-4 1000 m: 2007, 2009).

Ricsi, the younger brother of teammate Michal, is a member of the ŠKP Bratislava club. He is 181 cm (5 ft 11 in) tall and weighs 80 kg (180 lb). He has been a scholarship holder with the Olympic Solidarity program since August 2002.

== Personal life ==
Riszdorfer belongs to the Hungarian minority in Slovakia.
