= Lutz Altepost =

German sprint canoeist (born 1981)

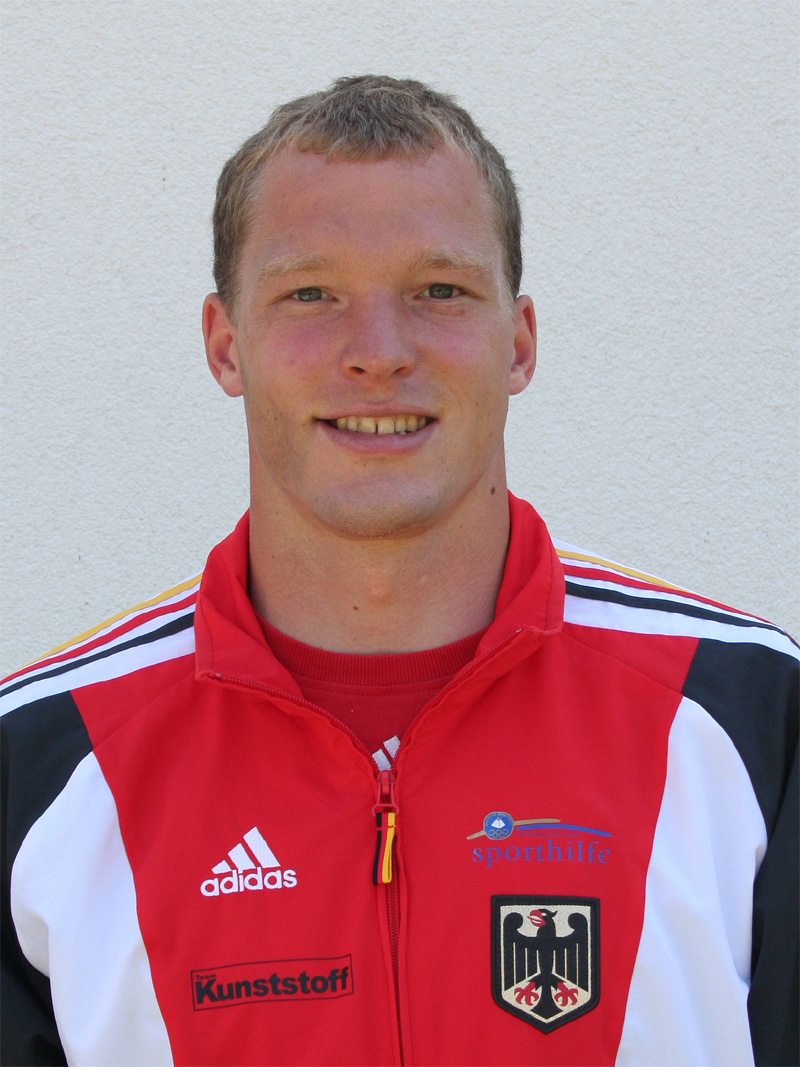
- Altepost in 2008

Medal record

Men's canoe sprint

Olympic Games
Bronze medal – third place	2008 Beijing	K-4 1000 m

World Championships
Gold medal – first place	2005 Zagreb	K-4 1000 m
Gold medal – first place	2007 Duisburg	K-4 1000 m
Silver medal – second place	2005 Zagreb	K-1 500 m
Bronze medal – third place	2003 Gainesville	K-1 500 m
Bronze medal – third place	2006 Szeged	K-1 500 m

Lutz Altepost (born October 6, 1981, in Emsdetten, North Rhine-Westphalia) is a German sprint canoeist who has competed since the late 1990s. Competing in two Summer Olympics, he won a bronze medal in the K-4 1000 m event at Beijing in 2008.

== Career ==
At the 1999 Junior World Championships in Zagreb, Croatia, he won two gold medals with Germany's four-man K-4 crew (K-4 500 m and K-4 1000 m).

As a senior, he has established himself among the elite K-1 500 m paddlers in international competitions but has yet to win an individual gold medal. In 2002 he finished sixteenth at the Seville world championships. The following year in Gainesville, USA, he took the bronze medal. At the Athens Olympics in 2004 he came seventh. At the 2005 ICF Canoe Sprint World Championships he won the silver medal.

After the Athens Olympics Altepost was chosen to lead Germany's revamped K4 boat. In their debut season together the new four won the K-4 1000 m world championship final in Zagreb ahead of reigning champions Slovakia giving Altepost his first gold medal as a senior.

In 2006, Altepost enjoyed mixed fortunes at the 2006 World Championships. In the individual K-1 500 m, he achieved a medal placing for the third consecutive year, this time winning the bronze medal. In the team kayak events however Altepost's K-4 crew were unable to repeat their Zagreb success and surprisingly failed to make the podium in any of the three race distances though they did win the K-4 1000 m event at the 2007 championships.

== Personal life ==
He is 193 cm (6 ft 4 in) tall and weighs 95 kg (209 lb).
