= Michal Riszdorfer =

Slovak sprint canoer

Medal record

Men's canoe sprint

Representing Slovakia

Olympic Games
| Silver medal – second place | 2008 Beijing | K-4 1000 m |
| Bronze medal – third place | 2004 Athens | K-4 1000 m |

World Championships
| Gold medal – first place | 1998 Szeged | K-2 500 m |
| Gold medal – first place | 1999 Milan | K-2 1000 m |
| Gold medal – first place | 2002 Seville | K-4 500 m |
| Gold medal – first place | 2002 Seville | K-4 1000 m |
| Gold medal – first place | 2003 Gainesville | K-4 500 m |
| Gold medal – first place | 2003 Gainesville | K-4 1000 m |
| Gold medal – first place | 2006 Szeged | K-4 500 m |
| Gold medal – first place | 2007 Duisburg | K-4 500 m |
| Silver medal – second place | 2005 Zagreb | K-4 500 m |
| Silver medal – second place | 2005 Zagreb | K-4 1000 m |
| Silver medal – second place | 2009 Dartmouth | K-4 200 m |
| Bronze medal – third place | 2001 Poznań | K-4 500 m |
| Bronze medal – third place | 2007 Duisburg | K-4 1000 m |
| Bronze medal – third place | 2009 Dartmouth | K-4 1000 m |

Michal Riszdorfer (Hungarian: Riszdorfer Mihály [ˈrizdorfɛr ˈmihaːj]; born 26 May 1977 in Bratislava) is a Slovak canoe sprinter who has competed since the late 1990s. Competing in three Summer Olympics, he won two medals in the K-4 1000 m with a silver in 2008 and a bronze in 2004.

Riszdorfer has also won fourteen medals at the ICF Canoe Sprint World Championships with eight golds (K-2 500 m: 1998, K-2 1000 m: 1999, K-4 500 m: 2002, 2003, 2006, 2007; K-4 1000 m: 2002, 2003), three silvers (K-4 200 m: 2009, K-4 500 m: 2005, K-4 1000 m: 2005), and three bronzes (K-4 500 m: 2001, K-4 1000 m: 2007, 2009).

Riszdorfer is a member of the ŠKP club in Bratislava. He is 177 cm (5 ft 10 in) tall and weighs 78 kg (172 lb).

== Personal life ==
Riszdorfer comes from the Hungarian minority in Slovakia. He was born in Bratislava and lived in Komárno, home to a sizeable Hungarian community on the shores of the Danube, since his early childhood. He has a younger brother Richard, who is also a canoer and member of the multiple medal winning K-4 boat.
