= Helmut Oblinger =

Austrian slalom canoeist (born 1973)

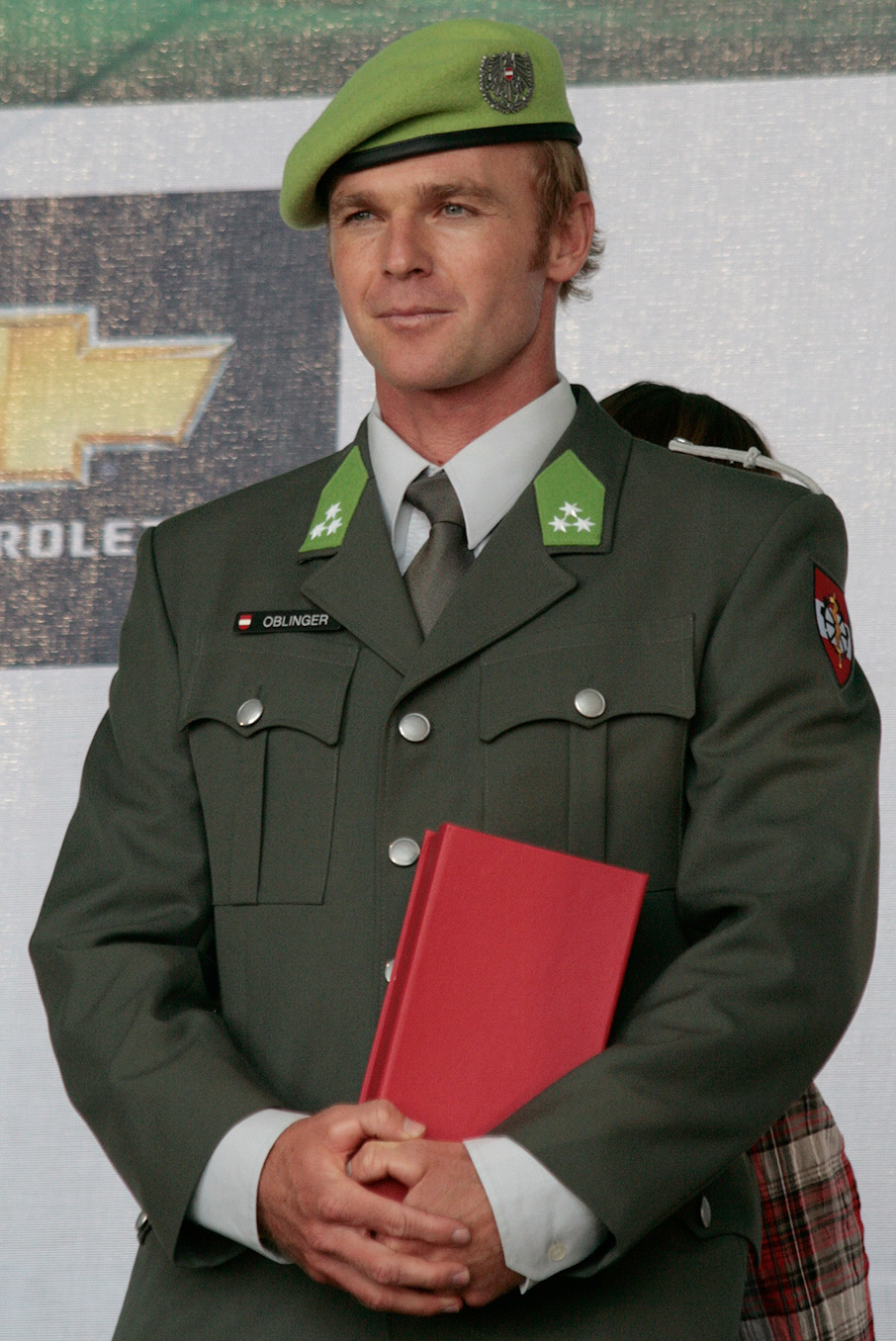
- Helmut Oblinger (2009)

Medal record

Men's canoe slalom

Representing Austria

World Championships
Bronze medal – third place	2003 Augsburg	K1

European Championships
Gold medal – first place	2005 Tacen	K1
Silver medal – second place	2002 Bratislava	K1
Bronze medal – third place	1996 Augsburg	K1 team
Bronze medal – third place	2012 Augsburg	K1 team

Helmut Oblinger (born 14 March 1973 in Schärding) is an Austrian slalom canoeist who competed from the early 1990s to 2015.

He won a bronze medal in the K1 event at the 2003 ICF Canoe Slalom World Championships in Augsburg. He also has four medals from the European Championships (1 gold, 1 silver and 2 bronzes). Oblinger also competed at five Summer Olympics, earning his best finish of fourth in the K1 event in Sydney in 2000.

His wife, Violetta, won a bronze medal in the women's K1 event at the 2008 Summer Olympics in Beijing.

== World Cup individual podiums ==
	1st place, gold medalist(s)	2nd place, silver medalist(s)	3rd place, bronze medalist(s)	Total
K1	2	5	4	11

Season	Date	Venue	Position	Event
1998	13 September 1998	La Seu d'Urgell	2nd	K1
2000	2 July 2000	Saint-Pé-de-Bigorre	2nd	K1
2000	9 July 2000	La Seu d'Urgell	2nd	K1
2001	3 June 2001	Merano	2nd	K1
2001	10 June 2001	Tacen	3rd	K1
2001	28 July 2001	Augsburg	3rd	K1
2002	26 May 2002	Guangzhou	1st	K1
2004	25 April 2004	Athens	3rd	K1
2004	23 May 2004	La Seu d'Urgell	3rd	K1
2005	26 June 2005	Tacen	1st	K1^{1}
2006	3 June 2006	Augsburg	2nd	K1

^{1} European Championship counting for World Cup points
