= Chronological summary of the 2008 Summer Olympics =

This article contains a chronological summary of major events from the 2008 Summer Olympics in Beijing, China.

== Calendar ==
All dates are Beijing Time (UTC+8)

OC	Opening ceremony	●	Event competitions	1	Gold medal events	EG	Exhibition gala	CC	Closing ceremony

August 2008		6th Wed	7th Thu	8th Fri	9th Sat	10th Sun	11th Mon	12th Tue	13th Wed	14th Thu	15th Fri	16th Sat	17th Sun	18th Mon	19th Tue	20th Wed	21st Thu	22nd Fri	23rd Sat	24th Sun	Events
Ceremonies				OC																CC	—N/a
Aquatics	Diving					1	1	1	1		●	●	1	●	1	●	1	●	1		46
Aquatics	Marathon swimming															1	1				46
Aquatics	Swimming				●	4	4	4	4	4	4	4	4								46
Aquatics	Synchronized swimming													●	●	1		●	1		46
Aquatics	Water polo					●	●	●	●	●	●	●	●	●	●	●	1	●		1	46
Archery					●	1	1	●	●	1	1										4
Athletics											2	4	6	6	5	3	6	7	7	1	47
Badminton					●	●	●	●	●	●	1	2	2								5
Baseball/Softball
Baseball/Softball	Baseball								●	●	●	●		●	●	●		●	1		2
Baseball/Softball	Softball							●	●	●	●	●	●	●		●	1				2
Basketball					●	●	●	●	●	●	●	●	●	●	●	●	●	●	1	1	2
Boxing					●	●	●	●	●	●	●	●	●	●	●	●		●	4	6	11
Canoeing	Slalom						●	2	●	●	2										16
Canoeing	Sprint													●	●	●	●	6	6		16
Cycling	Road cycling				1	1			2												18
Cycling	Track cycling										1	3	1	2	3						18
Cycling	BMX															●		2			18
Cycling	Mountain biking																		2		18
Equestrian					●	●	●	2	●	1	●	●	●	1	1		1				6
Fencing					1	1	1	1	2	1	1	1	1								10
Field hockey						●	●	●	●	●	●	●	●	●	●	●	●	1	1		2
Football		●	●		●	●		●	●		●	●		●	●		1	●	1		2
Gymnastics	Artistic				●	●		1	1	1	1	●	4	3	3	EG					18
Gymnastics	Rhythmic																●	●	1	1	18
Gymnastics	Trampolining											●		1	1						18
Handball					●	●	●	●	●	●	●	●	●	●	●	●	●	●	1	1	2
Judo					2	2	2	2	2	2	2										14
Modern pentathlon																	1	1			2
Rowing					●	●	●	●	●		●	7	7								14
Sailing					●	●	●	●	●		●	●	3	2	2	2	2				11
Shooting					2	2	2	2	1	2	1	2	1								15
Table tennis									●	●	●	●	1	1	●	●	●	1	1		4
Taekwondo																2	2	2	2		8
Tennis						●	●	●	●	●	●	1	3								4
Triathlon														1	1						2
Volleyball	Beach volleyball				●	●	●	●	●	●	●	●	●	●	●	●	1	1			4
Volleyball	Indoor volleyball				●	●	●	●	●	●	●	●	●	●	●	●	●	●	1	1	4
Weightlifting					1	2	2	2	2		2	1	1	1	1						15
Wrestling								2	2	3		2	2		2	2	2				18
Daily medal events					7	14	13	19	17	15	18	27	37	18	20	11	21	21	32	12	302
Cumulative total					7	21	34	53	70	85	103	130	167	185	205	216	237	258	290	302	302
August 2008		6th Wed	7th Thu	8th Fri	9th Sat	10th Sun	11th Mon	12th Tue	13th Wed	14th Thu	15th Fri	16th Sat	17th Sun	18th Mon	19th Tue	20th Wed	21st Thu	22nd Fri	23rd Sat	24th Sun	Events

== Day-by-day summaries ==
=== 6 August ===
Football

- The first competitions of the Games started at 5:00pm CST (UTC+8). The first events were women's football (soccer) matches. The day was devoted to women's football.

=== 7 August ===
Football

- The first football (soccer) matches for men began on this day. The day was devoted to men's football matches.

=== 8 August ===
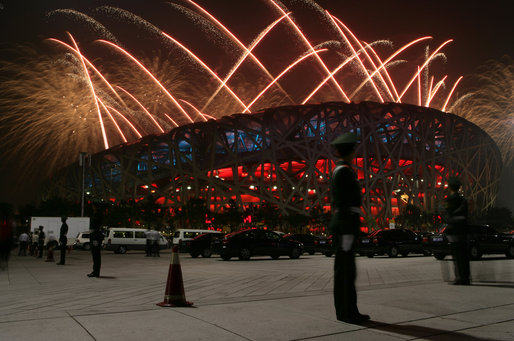
Fireworks during the opening ceremony

Opening Ceremony
Starting at 8:00 pm CST (UTC+8), the four-hour opening ceremony was attended by 91,000 spectators, including more than 100 world leaders. The spectacle was directed by filmmaker Zhang Yimou, and the Olympic Cauldron was lit by former Chinese gymnast Li Ning.

Equestrian

- The first events started in the Special Administrative Region of Hong Kong, with eventing in equestrian sports.

=== Day 1: 9 August ===
Archery

- South Korea set an Olympic record in the ranking round of the women's team archery event.

Boxing

- Samoa's Farani Tavui was taken to a hospital after being knocked unconscious in the men's light heavyweight event.

Fencing

- The United States took all three medals in the women's sabre event, the first U.S. podium sweep of a fencing event since 1904, as Mariel Zagunis takes gold.

Judo

- Choi Min-ho of South Korea won the men's 60 kg ending all his matches with ippon.
- Ryoko Tani of Japan, who had never lost in a major international competition since 1996, was defeated in the women's 48 kg semifinals by eventual gold medalist Alina Alexandra Dumitru with a controversial penalty point.

Shooting

- Kateřina Emmons of the Czech Republic won the first gold medal of the games, setting an Olympic record for both the qualifying (with a perfect 400) and final scores, in the women's 10 m air rifle.

Swimming

- Swimmer Michael Phelps of the United States set a world record in the first round of the men's 400 m individual medley.
- Swimmer Alexander Dale Oen of Norway set an Olympic record in the first round of the men's 100 m breaststroke.

Weightlifting

- Chen Xiexia of China won the women's 48 kg event in weightlifting, setting Olympic records in both the clean and jerk, and total weight lifted.

Gold medalists
Sport	Event	Competitor(s)	NOC	Rec	Ref
Cycling	Men's road race	Samuel Sánchez	Spain		
Fencing	Women's sabre	Mariel Zagunis	United States		
Judo	Men's 60 kg	Choi Min-Ho	South Korea		
Judo	Women's 48 kg	Alina Alexandra Dumitru	Romania		
Shooting	Men's 10 m air pistol	Pang Wei	China		
Shooting	Women's 10 m air rifle	Kateřina Emmons	Czech Republic	OR	
Weightlifting	Women's 48 kg	Chen Xiexia	China	OR	

=== Day 2: 10 August ===
Archery

- South Korea set a world record for a 24-arrow team match, in their victory over Italy in the quarter finals of the women's team archery event. They went on to win the gold medal, stretching the country's winning streak to 20 years over 6 Olympic games.

Basketball

- The USA men's basketball team beat hosts China 101–70 in the first game in the basketball event.

Shooting

- Guo Wenjun of China won gold in women's 10 metre air pistol and set a new Olympic record for final score with 492.3 points, after Natalia Paderina of Russia had bettered the Olympic qualification record to 391. During the medal ceremony, Pederina and bronze medalist Nino Salukvadze of Georgia shared a symbolic embrace as their two countries continued to wage war.

Swimming

- Michael Phelps won the men's 400 m individual medley final, with a new world record, winning his seventh career Olympic gold medal.
- Park Tae-Hwan won the men's 400 m freestyle final, becoming the first South Korean swimmer to win an Olympic gold medal for swimming.
- Swimmer Alexander Dale Oen of Norway set an Olympic record in the semifinals of the men's 100 m breaststroke, his second in the event.
- Australian swimmer Stephanie Rice set a new world record in women's 400 m individual medley, winning Australia's 400th Summer Olympics medal. Second place Kirsty Coventry of Zimbabwe also finished below the previous world record.
- The Netherlands team won the women's 4 × 100 m freestyle relay final with a new Olympic record of 3 minutes 33.76 seconds. Dara Torres of the United States, at 41 years of age, becomes the oldest swimmer to win an Olympic medal after the US team takes silver.
- The American men's 4 × 100 m freestyle relay team broke the world record with a time of 3:12.23 in the preliminaries.

Weightlifting

- Prapawadee Jaroenrattanatarakoon of Thailand won gold in women's 53 kg weightlifting and set a new Olympic record for clean and jerk.

Gold medalists
Sport	Event	Competitor(s)	NOC	Rec	Ref
Archery	Women's team	Park Sung-hyun, Yun Ok-Hee, Joo Hyun-Jung	South Korea		
Cycling	Women's road race	Nicole Cooke	Great Britain		
Diving	Women's synchronised 3 m springboard	Guo Jingjing and Wu Minxia	China		
Fencing	Men's épée	Matteo Tagliariol	Italy		
Judo	Men's 66 kg	Masato Uchishiba	Japan		
Judo	Women's 52 kg	Xian Dongmei	China		
Shooting	Men's trap	David Kostelecký	Czech Republic	OR	
Shooting	Women's 10 m air pistol	Guo Wenjun	China	OR	
Swimming	Men's 400 m freestyle	Park Tae-Hwan	South Korea		
Swimming	Men's 400 m individual medley	Michael Phelps	United States	WR	
Swimming	Women's 4 × 100 m freestyle relay	Inge Dekker, Ranomi Kromowidjojo, Femke Heemskerk, Marleen Veldhuis; Heats: Hinkelien Schreuder, Manon van Rooijen	Netherlands	OR	
Swimming	Women's 400 m individual medley	Stephanie Rice	Australia	WR	
Weightlifting	Men's 56 kg	Long Qingquan	China		
Weightlifting	Women's 53 kg	Prapawadee Jaroenrattanatarakoon	Thailand	OR	

=== Day 3: 11 August ===
Swimming

- Rebecca Adlington won the 400 m freestyle, the first gold by a British woman since 1960.
- Kirsty Coventry of Zimbabwe set a new world record in the women's 100 m backstroke semifinal with a time of 58.77.
- Kosuke Kitajima of Japan won the Olympic gold medal in the men's 100 m breaststroke, and set a world record of 58.91.
- Arkady Vyatchanin of Russia set a new Olympic record in the men's 100 m backstroke semifinal with a time of 53.06, only for the record to be set again in the second semifinal by Hayden Stoeckel of Australia, with a time of 52.97.
- The United States team broke the world record they had set in the semifinals by nearly four seconds, winning the gold medal in the men's 4 × 100 m freestyle relay with a time of 3:08:24, beating France by 0.08 seconds. Jason Lezak swam the last leg in 46.06 s, the fastest relay leg in history. Five of the eight teams in the final finished under the previous world record. Australia's Eamon Sullivan also broke the individual 100 m freestyle world record by swimming the leadoff leg in 47.24.

Shooting

- Entering the finals of the men's 10 m air rifle in fourth place, Abhinav Bindra won the first ever individual Olympic gold medal for India, and India's first gold medal in any Olympic event since 1980.

Judo

- Tajikistan won its first ever Olympic medal after Rasul Boqiev secured bronze in the men's 73 kg.

Gold medalists
Sport	Event	Competitor(s)	NOC	Rec	Ref
Archery	Men's team	Im Dong-Hyun, Lee Chang-Hwan, Park Kyung-Mo	South Korea	OR	
Diving	Men's synchronised 10 m platform	Lin Yue and Huo Liang	China		
Fencing	Women's foil	Valentina Vezzali	Italy		
Judo	Men's 73 kg	Elnur Mammadli	Azerbaijan		
Judo	Women's 57 kg	Giulia Quintavalle	Italy		
Shooting	Men's 10 m air rifle	Abhinav Bindra	India		
Shooting	Women's trap	Satu Mäkelä-Nummela	Finland		
Swimming	Men's 100 m breaststroke	Kosuke Kitajima	Japan	WR	
Swimming	Men's 4 × 100 m freestyle relay	Michael Phelps, Garrett Weber-Gale, Cullen Jones, Jason Lezak; Heats: Nathan Adrian, Ben Wildman-Tobriner, Matt Grevers	United States	WR	
Swimming	Women's 100 m butterfly	Libby Trickett	Australia		
Swimming	Women's 400 m freestyle	Rebecca Adlington	Great Britain		
Weightlifting	Men's 62 kg	Zhang Xiangxiang	China		
Weightlifting	Women's 58 kg	Chen Yanqing	China	OR	

=== Day 4: 12 August ===
Swimming

- Michael Phelps of the U.S. set the world record while winning the 200 m men's freestyle, tying the record for most gold medals for an athlete.
- Natalie Coughlin of the U.S. became the first athlete to successfully defend a gold medal in the women's 100 m backstroke event.

Shooting

- Walton Eller of the U.S. set two Olympic records in the men's double trap event, with a qualifying score of 145 and a final score of 190.

Canoeing

- Benjamin Boukpeti becomes the first competitor from Togo to win an Olympic medal, taking bronze in the men's slalom K-1.

Gold medalists
Sport	Event	Competitor(s)	NOC	Rec	Ref
Canoeing	Men's slalom C-1	Michal Martikán	Slovakia		
Canoeing	Men's slalom K-1	Alexander Grimm	Germany		
Diving	Women's synchronized 10 m platform	Wang Xin and Chen Ruolin	China		
Equestrian	Individual eventing	Hinrich Romeike	Germany		
Equestrian	Team eventing	Peter Thomsen, Frank Ostholt, Hinrich Romeike, Ingrid Klimke, Andreas Dibowski	Germany		
Fencing	Men's sabre	Zhong Man	China		
Gymnastics	Men's artistic team all-around	Huang Xu, Chen Yibing, Li Xiaopeng, Xiao Qin, Yang Wei, Zou Kai	China		
Judo	Men's 81 kg	Ole Bischof	Germany		
Judo	Women's 63kg	Ayumi Tanimoto	Japan		
Shooting	Men's 50 m pistol	Jin Jong-oh	South Korea		
Shooting	Men's double trap	Walton Eller	United States	OR	
Swimming	Men's 100 m backstroke	Aaron Peirsol	United States	WR	
Swimming	Men's 200 m freestyle	Michael Phelps	United States	WR	
Swimming	Women's 100 m backstroke	Natalie Coughlin	United States		
Swimming	Women's 100 m breaststroke	Leisel Jones	Australia	OR	
Weightlifting	Men's 69 kg	Liao Hui	China		
Weightlifting	Women's 63 kg	Pak Hyon Suk	North Korea		
Wrestling	Men's Greco-Roman 55 kg	Nazyr Mankiev	Russia		
Wrestling	Men's Greco-Roman 60 kg	Islam-Beka Albiev	Russia		

=== Day 5: 13 August ===
Wrestling

- Steeve Guenot won France's first gold medal of the Beijing Olympics in the men's 66 kg Greco-Roman wrestling.

Swimming

- Michael Phelps of the U.S. took the record for most gold medals for an athlete with 11 for wins in the 200 m butterfly and the 4 × 200 m relay.

Gymnastics

- The Chinese women's gymnastic team won its first ever team gold medal.

Weightlifting

- Hungary's Janos Baranyai was taken to hospital after a severe injury during the men's 77kg event in weightlifting.

Gold medalists
Sport	Event	Competitor(s)	NOC	Rec	Ref
Cycling	Men's road time trial	Fabian Cancellara	Switzerland		
Cycling	Women's road time trial	Kristin Armstrong	United States		
Diving	Men's synchronized 3 m springboard	Wang Feng and Qin Kai	China		
Fencing	Men's foil	Benjamin Kleibrink	Germany		
Fencing	Women's épée	Britta Heidemann	Germany		
Gymnastics	Women's artistic team all-around	Yang Yilin, Cheng Fei, Jiang Yuyan, Deng Linlin, He Kexin, Li Shanshan	China		
Judo	Men's 90 kg	Irakli Tsirekidze	Georgia		
Judo	Women's 70 kg	Masae Ueno	Japan		
Shooting	Women's 25 m pistol	Chen Ying	China		
Swimming	Men's 200 m butterfly	Michael Phelps	United States	WR	
Swimming	Men's 4 × 200 m freestyle relay	Michael Phelps, Ryan Lochte, Ricky Berens, Peter Vanderkaay; Heats: Klete Keller, Erik Vendt, David Walters	United States	WR	
Swimming	Women's 200 m freestyle	Federica Pellegrini	Italy	WR	
Swimming	Women's 200 m individual medley	Stephanie Rice	Australia	WR	
Weightlifting	Men's 77 kg	Sa Jae-Hyouk	South Korea		
Weightlifting	Women's 69 kg	Liu Chunhong	China	WR	
Wrestling	Men's Greco-Roman 66 kg	Steeve Guenot	France		
Wrestling	Men's Greco-Roman 74 kg	Manuchar Kvirkelia	Georgia		

=== Day 6: 14 August ===
Swimming

- Alain Bernard became the first French swimmer to win the men's 100 m freestyle, and only the third to win a gold medal in an Olympic swimming event.
- The Australian team of Stephanie Rice, Bronte Barratt, Kylie Palmer and Linda Mackenzie won the women's 4 × 200 m freestyle relay, setting a new world record time of 7 minutes 44.31 seconds and giving Rice her third gold medal at her first Olympics.
- Liu Zige won the only gold medal in a swimming event, the Women's 200 m butterfly, won by China in the games.

Archery

- Zhang Juanjuan of China won the women's individual archery competition by beating the top three ranked archers in the event.

Judo

- Naidangiin Tüvshinbayar won Mongolia's first Olympic gold medal in the men's 100 kg.

Wrestling

- Ara Abrahamian won a bronze medal in the 84-kilogram Greco-Roman wrestling, but during the medal ceremony stepped off of the podium and laid his medal down on the mat. Abrahamian had lost a 3-1 decision to Andrea Minguzzi in the semi-finals in a disputed decision and started shouting at referees and officials after the match. The IOC later decided to officially strip him of his medal.

Gold medalists
Sport	Event	Competitor(s)	NOC	Rec	Ref
Archery	Women's individual	Zhang Juanjuan	China		
Equestrian	Team dressage	Isabell Werth, Nadine Capellmann, Heike Kemmer	Germany		
Fencing	Women's team sabre	Olga Kharlan, Olena Khomrova; Halyna Pundyk, Olha Zhovnir	Ukraine		
Gymnastics	Men's artistic individual all-around	Yang Wei	China		
Judo	Men's 100 kg	Naidangiin Tüvshinbayar	Mongolia		
Judo	Women's 78 kg	Yang Xiuli	China		
Shooting	Women's 50 m rifle three positions	Du Li	China		
Shooting	Women's skeet	Chiara Cainero	Italy	OR	
Swimming	Men's 100 m freestyle	Alain Bernard	France		
Swimming	Men's 200 m breaststroke	Kosuke Kitajima	Japan	OR	
Swimming	Women's 200 m butterfly	Liu Zige	China	WR	
Swimming	Women's 4 × 200 m freestyle relay	Stephanie Rice, Bronte Barratt, Kylie Palmer, Linda Mackenzie; Heats: Felicity Galvez, Angie Bainbridge, Melanie Schlanger, Lara Davenport	Australia	WR	
Wrestling	Men's Greco-Roman 84 kg	Andrea Minguzzi	Italy		
Wrestling	Men's Greco-Roman 96 kg	Aslanbek Khushtov	Russia		
Wrestling	Men's Greco-Roman 120 kg	Mijail López	Cuba		

=== Day 7: 15 August ===
Athletics

- Tirunesh Dibaba won the women's 10000 m in 29:54.66, the best time in almost 15 years and an African and Olympic record. Silver medallist Elvan Abeylegesse and bronze medallist Shalane Flanagan also ran European and North American records, respectively.

Gymnastics

- Nastia Liukin of the United States won the gold medal in the Women's artistic individual all-around. Together with Shawn Johnson taking the silver, this was the fourth time in Olympic history where a country took the top two spots in the individual all around events.

Table tennis

- Singapore qualified for the final in the women's team event, thus ensuring that the country would win its first Olympic medal, in any event, since 1960.

Judo

- Down a yuko and with only 16 seconds left, world champion China's Tong Wen managed to throw defending Olympic champion Japan's Maki Tsukada for the gold in women's +78 kg.

Tennis

- Simon Aspelin and Thomas Johansson reached the men's doubles final by beating Frenchmen Arnaud Clément and Michaël Llodra in a match lasted more than four hours and ended 19–17 in the third set.

Gold medalists
Sport	Event	Competitor(s)	NOC	Rec	Ref
Archery	Men's individual	Viktor Ruban	Ukraine		
Athletics	Men's shot put	Tomasz Majewski	Poland		
Athletics	Women's 10000 m	Tirunesh Dibaba	Ethiopia	OR	
Badminton	Women's doubles	Du Jing and Yu Yang	China		
Canoeing	Men's slalom C-2	Pavol Hochschorner and Peter Hochschorner	Slovakia		
Canoeing	Women's slalom K-1	Elena Kaliská	Slovakia		
Cycling	Men's team sprint	Chris Hoy, Jason Kenny, Jamie Staff	Great Britain		
Fencing	Men's team épée	Jérôme Jeannet, Fabrice Jeannet, Ulrich Robeiri	France		
Gymnastics	Women's artistic individual all-around	Nastia Liukin	United States		
Judo	Men's +100 kg	Satoshi Ishii	Japan		
Judo	Women's +78 kg	Tong Wen	China		
Shooting	Men's 50 m rifle prone	Artur Ayvazyan	Ukraine		
Swimming	Men's 200 m backstroke	Ryan Lochte	United States	WR	
Swimming	Men's 200 m individual medley	Michael Phelps	United States	WR	
Swimming	Women's 100 m freestyle	Britta Steffen	Germany	OR	
Swimming	Women's 200 m breaststroke	Rebecca Soni	United States	WR	
Weightlifting	Men's 85 kg	Lu Yong	China		
Weightlifting	Women's 75 kg	Cao Lei	China	OR	

=== Day 8: 16 August ===
General

- New Zealand experienced their most successful day at an Olympics (with two gold, one silver, and two bronze medals), beating their previous best of four bronze medals in the 1988 Seoul Olympics.

Athletics

- Russia's Valeriy Borchin won gold in the men's 20 km walk with a time of 1:19:01, edging out Jefferson Pérez, the world champion since 2003, by only 14 seconds.
- Jamaica's Usain Bolt won the gold medal in the men's 100m with a world record of 9.69 seconds in a race dubbed by Michael Johnson as "the greatest 100m performance in the history of the event".

Badminton

- Zhang Ning successfully defended her women's singles Olympic title against top seed Xie Xingfang.

Rowing

- The British team of Tom James, Steve Williams, Pete Reed and Andrew Triggs Hodge won the men's coxless fours, the third time in a row that Great Britain had won gold in this event.
- New Zealand's Caroline and Georgina Evers-Swindell successfully defended their 2004 title in the women's double sculls by beating Germany by 0.01 seconds.
- Georgeta Andrunache of Romania won gold in the final women's coxless pair race, her fifth career gold, and her third consecutive Olympic gold in that event.

Swimming

- Michael Phelps' victory by 0.01 seconds in the men's 100 m butterfly over Serbian swimmer Milorad Čavić tied him with Mark Spitz for the most Olympic gold medals at one games.
- César Cielo Filho won the men's 50 m freestyle, Brazil's first ever swimming Olympic gold medal.
- Rebecca Adlington won gold in the women's 800 m freestyle, breaking a world record that had stood since 1989.

Tennis

- Roger Federer won his first Olympic medal by teaming up with Stanislas Wawrinka to win men's doubles for Switzerland.

Weightlifting

- Jang Mi-Ran of South Korea won the unlimited (+75 kg) division of women's weightlifting by breaking world records five times: once in snatch, twice in clean-and-jerk, and twice in total.

Wrestling

- Carol Huynh of Canada won the first medal of the games for Canada and became the first gold medalist in women's wrestling for Canada.

Gold medalists
Sport	Event	Competitor(s)	NOC	Rec	Ref
Athletics	Men's 100 m	Usain Bolt	Jamaica	WR	
Athletics	Men's 20 km walk	Valeriy Borchin	Russia		
Athletics	Women's heptathlon	Natalya Dobrynska	Ukraine		
Athletics	Women's shot put	Valerie Vili	New Zealand		
Badminton	Men's doubles	Markis Kido and Hendra Setiawan	Indonesia		
Badminton	Women's singles	Zhang Ning	China		
Cycling	Men's individual pursuit	Bradley Wiggins	Great Britain		
Cycling	Men's keirin	Chris Hoy	Great Britain		
Cycling	Men's points race	Joan Llaneras	Spain		
Fencing	Women's team foil	Svetlana Boyko, Aida Chanaeva, Victoria Nikichina, Evgenia Lamonova	Russia		
Rowing	Men's single sculls	Olaf Tufte	Norway		
Rowing	Men's double sculls	David Crawshay and Scott Brennan	Australia		
Rowing	Men's coxless pair	Drew Ginn and Duncan Free	Australia		
Rowing	Men's coxless four	Tom James, Steve Williams, Pete Reed, Andrew Triggs Hodge	Great Britain		
Rowing	Women's single sculls	Rumyana Neykova	Bulgaria		
Rowing	Women's double sculls	Georgina Evers-Swindell and Caroline Evers-Swindell	New Zealand		
Rowing	Women's coxless pair	Georgeta Andrunache and Viorica Susanu	Romania		
Shooting	Men's 25 m rapid fire pistol	Oleksandr Petriv	Ukraine	OR	
Shooting	Men's skeet	Vincent Hancock	United States	OR	
Swimming	Men's 50 m freestyle	César Cielo Filho	Brazil	OR	
Swimming	Men's 100 m butterfly	Michael Phelps	United States	OR	
Swimming	Women's 200 m backstroke	Kirsty Coventry	Zimbabwe	WR	
Swimming	Women's 800 m freestyle	Rebecca Adlington	Great Britain	WR	
Tennis	Men's doubles	Roger Federer and Stanislas Wawrinka	Switzerland		
Weightlifting	Women's +75 kg	Jang Mi-Ran	South Korea	WR	
Wrestling	Women's freestyle 48 kg	Carol Huynh	Canada		
Wrestling	Women's freestyle 55 kg	Saori Yoshida	Japan		

=== Day 9: 17 August ===
General

- China won its 33rd gold medal of the Beijing games by beating Singapore in the table tennis women's team event, surpassing its 32 golds of the Athens games and making this the most successful Olympiad ever for China.

Athletics

- Jamaica took all three medals in the women's 100 m, with Shelly-Ann Fraser taking gold, and Sherone Simpson and Kerron Stewart tying for silver.
- Russia's Gulnara Galkina-Samitova broke her own world record in winning the women's 3000 m steeplechase in a time of 8 minutes 58.81 seconds.

Cycling

- Britain's Rebecca Romero won a cycling gold to become one of the few athletes with medals in two distinct disciplines, the 2008 medal being added to her 2004 rowing silver.

Diving

- China's Guo Jingjing became the most decorated diver in Olympic history after winning her sixth career medal in the women's 3 m springboard.

Gymnastics

- Louis Smith, in winning the bronze medal in the men's pommel horse, became the first British gymnast to win an individual apparatus medal in gymnastics and the first Briton to win any individual gymnastics medal since Walter Tysall won men's all-around medal in 1908.

Rowing

- China won its first ever Olympic rowing gold medal in the women's quadruple sculls.

Sailing

- Ben Ainslie of Britain successfully defended his title, winning gold in the Finn class.

Shooting

- Matthew Emmons finished fourth in the men's 50 m rifle three positions event having held the lead with one shot remaining: four years earlier he had fallen from first to eighth in the last shot of the event. China's Qiu Jian, who had entered the final in fourth position, shot the highest score in the final round to win the gold medal.

Swimming

- The United States defeated Australia in the men's 4 × 100 m medley relay, setting a new world record of 3 minutes 29.34 seconds. Michael Phelps, swimming the third leg, won his eighth Olympic gold medal of the Beijing Games, surpassing Mark Spitz to become the athlete to win the most gold medals in a single Olympiad.
- Germany's Britta Steffen won the women's 50 m freestyle setting a new Olympic record of 24.06 seconds and beating American Dara Torres by just 0.01 seconds.
- Australia won the women's 4 × 100 m medley relay and set a new world record of 3:52.69, bettering the previous world record by 3.05 seconds. The United States won silver, also going under the previous world record and setting a new American record, while China won bronze with a new Asian record.

Table Tennis

- China won the inaugural women's team event by winning all ten of its singles and all five of its doubles matches in the tournament.

Tennis

- Rafael Nadal of Spain defeated Chile's Fernando González 6–3, 7-6 (7–2), 6–3 to win the men's singles, Spain's first ever Olympic gold medal in tennis. Gonzalez's medal was his third, making him Chile's most successful athlete at the Olympics.

Wrestling

- Japan's Kaori Icho successfully defended her Olympic title in women's freestyle 63 kg.

Gold medalists
Sport	Event	Competitor(s)	NOC	Rec	Ref
Athletics	Men's 10000 m	Kenenisa Bekele	Ethiopia	OR	
Athletics	Men's hammer throw	Primož Kozmus	Slovenia		
Athletics	Women's 100 m	Shelly-Ann Fraser	Jamaica		
Athletics	Women's 3000 m steeplechase	Gulnara Galkina-Samitova	Russia	WR	
Athletics	Women's marathon	Constantina Diṭă-Tomescu	Romania		
Athletics	Women's triple jump	Françoise Mbango Etone	Cameroon	OR	
Badminton	Men's singles	Lin Dan	China		
Badminton	Mixed doubles	Lee Yong-dae and Lee Hyo-jung	South Korea		
Cycling	Women's individual pursuit	Rebecca Romero	Great Britain		
Diving	Women's 3 m springboard	Guo Jingjing	China		
Fencing	Men's team sabre	Nicolas Lopez, Julien Pillet, Boris Sanson	France		
Gymnastics	Men's floor	Zou Kai	China		
Gymnastics	Men's pommel horse	Xiao Qin	China		
Gymnastics	Women's floor	Sandra Izbaşa	Romania		
Gymnastics	Women's vault	Hong Un Jong	North Korea		
Rowing	Men's lightweight double sculls	Zac Purchase and Mark Hunter	Great Britain		
Rowing	Men's lightweight coxless four	Thomas Ebert, Morten Jørgensen, Mads Andersen, Eskild Ebbesen	Denmark		
Rowing	Men's quadruple sculls	Konrad Wasielewski, Marek Kolbowicz, Michał Jeliński, Adam Korol	Poland		
Rowing	Men's eight	Kevin Light, Ben Rutledge, Andrew Byrnes, Jake Wetzel, Malcolm Howard, Dominic Sieterle, Adam Kreek, Kyle Hamilton, Brian Price	Canada		
Rowing	Women's lightweight double sculls	Kirsten van der Kolk and Marit van Eupen	Netherlands		
Rowing	Women's quadruple sculls	Tang Bin, Xi Aihua, Jin Ziwei, Zhang Yangyang	China		
Rowing	Women's eight	Erin Cafaro, Lindsay Shoop, Anna Goodale, Elle Logan, Anna Cummins, Susan Francia, Caroline Lind, Caryn Davies, Mary Whipple	United States		
Sailing	Finn class	Ben Ainslie	Great Britain		
Sailing	Yngling class	Sarah Ayton, Sarah Webb, Pippa Wilson	Great Britain		
Sailing	49er class	Jonas Warrer and Martin Kirketerp Ibsen	Denmark		
Shooting	Men's 50 m rifle three positions	Qiu Jian	China		
Swimming	Men's 1500 m freestyle	Oussama Mellouli	Tunisia		
Swimming	Men's 4 × 100 m medley relay	Aaron Peirsol, Brendan Hansen; Michael Phelps, Jason Lezak; Heats: Matt Grevers, Mark Gangloff, Ian Crocker, Garrett Weber-Gale	United States	WR	
Swimming	Women's 50 m freestyle	Britta Steffen	Germany	OR	
Swimming	Women's 4 × 100 m medley relay	Emily Seebohm, Leisel Jones, Jessicah Schipper, Lisbeth Trickett; Heats: Tarnee White, Felicity Galvez, Shayne Reese	Australia	WR	
Table tennis	Women's team	Guo Yue, Zhang Yining, Wang Nan	China		
Tennis	Men's singles	Rafael Nadal	Spain		
Tennis	Women's singles	Elena Dementieva	Russia		
Tennis	Women's doubles	Venus Williams and Serena Williams	United States		
Weightlifting	Men's 94 kg	Ilya Ilyin	Kazakhstan		
Wrestling	Women's freestyle 63 kg	Kaori Icho	Japan		
Wrestling	Women's freestyle 72 kg	Wang Jiao	China		

=== Day 10: 18 August ===
Athletics

- Liu Xiang, China's defending Olympic champion in the men's 110 m hurdles, withdrew from the competition due to an injury.
- Irving Saladino won Panama's first Olympic medal in 60 years, and their first gold medal ever in an Olympic athletics event.
- The United States took all three medals in the men's 400 m hurdles, with Angelo Taylor winning gold, Kerron Clement silver and Bershawn Jackson bronze.
- Russia's Yelena Isinbayeva set a new world record in winning the women's pole vault, the third time she had done so in 2008.

Table Tennis

- Like the women, the Chinese men won the team competition without losing a match, winning all ten singles and all five doubles matches.

Weightlifting

- Andrei Aramnau of Belarus broke three world records, for the snatch, clean and jerk, and total, on the way to winning the men's 105 kg event.

Gold medalists
Sport	Event	Competitor(s)	NOC	Rec	Ref
Athletics	Men's 400 m hurdles	Angelo Taylor	United States		
Athletics	Men's 3000 m steeplechase	Brimin Kiprop Kipruto	Kenya		
Athletics	Men's long jump	Irving Saladino	Panama		
Athletics	Women's 800 m	Pamela Jelimo	Kenya		
Athletics	Women's discus throw	Stephanie Brown Trafton	United States		
Athletics	Women's pole vault	Yelena Isinbayeva	Russia	WR	
Cycling	Men's team pursuit	Ed Clancy, Paul Manning, Geraint Thomas, Bradley Wiggins	Great Britain	WR	
Cycling	Women's points race	Marianne Vos	Netherlands		
Equestrian	Team jumping	Laura Kraut, Beezie Madden, Will Simpson, McLain Ward	United States		
Gymnastics	Men's rings	Chen Yibing	China		
Gymnastics	Men's vault	Leszek Blanik	Poland		
Gymnastics	Women's trampoline	He Wenna	China		
Gymnastics	Women's uneven bars	He Kexin	China		
Sailing	Men's 470 class	Nathan Wilmot and Malcolm Page	Australia		
Sailing	Women's 470 class	Elise Rechichi and Tessa Parkinson	Australia		
Table tennis	Men's team	Wang Hao, Ma Lin, Wang Liqin	China		
Triathlon	Women's	Emma Snowsill	Australia		
Weightlifting	Men's 105 kg	Andrei Aramnau	Belarus	WR	

=== Day 11: 19 August ===
Athletics

- Great Britain won the women's 400 m for the first time through Christine Ohuruogu. Jamaica's Shericka Williams took silver and Sanya Richards of the United States took bronze.
- Lolo Jones of the United States clipped the second-last hurdle in the women's 100 m hurdles, finishing seventh; however, the US still took gold through Dawn Harper. Australia's Sally McLellan won the silver medal and Canada's Priscilla Lopes-Schliep was third.

Cycling

- Chris Hoy won his third gold medal of the Beijing games in the men's sprint event, becoming the first British athlete in 100 years to win three gold medals in a single Olympiad.
- Victoria Pendelton added gold to the Great British track cycling medal total giving Great Britain victory in seven out of the ten track cycling titles. The team won 12 medals including 7 gold, 3 silver and 2 bronze to dominate the track events.

Football

- Argentina defeated tournament favourite and longtime rival Brazil 3–0 in the semifinal of the men's football.

Gold medalists
Sport	Event	Competitor(s)	NOC	Rec	Ref
Athletics	Men's 1500 m	Asbel Kiprop	Kenya		
Athletics	Men's discus throw	Gerd Kanter	Estonia		
Athletics	Men's high jump	Andrey Silnov	Russia		
Athletics	Women's 100 m hurdles	Dawn Harper	United States		
Athletics	Women's 400 m	Christine Ohuruogu	Great Britain		
Cycling	Men's Madison	Juan Curuchet and Walter Pérez	Argentina		
Cycling	Men's sprint	Chris Hoy	Great Britain		
Cycling	Women's sprint	Victoria Pendleton	Great Britain		
Diving	Men's 3 m springboard	He Chong	China		
Equestrian	Individual dressage	Anky van Grunsven	Netherlands		
Gymnastics	Men's horizontal bar	Zou Kai	China		
Gymnastics	Men's parallel bars	Li Xiaopeng	China		
Gymnastics	Men's trampoline	Lu Chunlong	China		
Gymnastics	Women's balance beam	Shawn Johnson	United States		
Sailing	Men's Laser class	Paul Goodison	Great Britain		
Sailing	Women's Laser Radial class	Anna Tunnicliffe	United States		
Triathlon	Men's	Jan Frodeno	Germany		
Weightlifting	Men's +105 kg	Matthias Steiner	Germany		
Wrestling	Men's freestyle 55 kg	Henry Cejudo	United States		
Wrestling	Men's freestyle 60 kg	Mavlet Batirov	Russia		

=== Day 12: 20 August ===
Athletics

- Usain Bolt won the men's 200 m in a new world record time of 19.30 seconds to become the first sprinter since Carl Lewis in 1984 to win both the 100 m and 200 m events in a single Olympiad, and the first sprinter since Don Quarrie in 1976 to hold the world records for both events simultaneously.
- In the men's 200 m, United States' Wallace Spearmon, who finished third in 19.85s, was disqualified for stepping out of his lane. Later, Netherlands Antilles' Churandy Martina, who finished second in 19.82s, was also disqualified for stepping out of his lane.

Swimming

- After a race lasting nearly two hours, Russia's Larisa Ilchenko beat Keri-Anne Payne of Great Britain by 1.5 seconds to win the women's 10 km marathon. Payne and fellow British swimmer Cassandra Patten, who took bronze, had shared the lead for almost the entire race before being overtaken by Ilchenko with 50 metres remaining.
- Natalie du Toit of South Africa became the first amputee to compete in the Olympic Games since George Eyser in 1904, finishing 16th in the women's 10 km marathon.

Sailing

- Yin Jian won China's first ever Olympic sailing gold medal in the women's sailboard.

Taekwondo

- Rohullah Nikpai won Afghanistan's first Olympic medal ever by taking bronze in the men's 58 kg contest.
- Wu Jingyu from China defeated Thai athlete Buttree Puedpong in taekwondo women's 49 kg contest receiving a gold medal. Buttree became the first Thai athlete ever to win a silver medal for taekwondo and got the first silver medal for Thailand in 2008 Games.

Gold medalists
Sport	Event	Competitor(s)	NOC	Rec	Ref
Athletics	Men's 200 m	Usain Bolt	Jamaica	WR	
Athletics	Women's 400 m hurdles	Melaine Walker	Jamaica	OR	
Athletics	Women's hammer throw	Aksana Miankova	Belarus	OR	
Sailing	Men's sailboard	Tom Ashley	New Zealand		
Sailing	Women's sailboard	Yin Jian	China		
Swimming	Women's marathon 10 km	Larisa Ilchenko	Russia		
Synchronized swimming	Women's duet	Anastasia Davydova and Anastasia Ermakova	Russia		
Taekwondo	Men's 58 kg	Guillermo Pérez	Mexico		
Taekwondo	Women's 49 kg	Wu Jingyu	China		
Wrestling	Men's freestyle 66 kg	Ramazan Şahin	Turkey		
Wrestling	Men's freestyle 74 kg	Buvaysa Saytiev	Russia		

=== Day 13: 21 August ===
Athletics

- Seven teams were eliminated in the men's and women's 4 × 100 m relay semifinals.
- Cuban sprinter Dayron Robles won the men's 110 m hurdles gold medal.
- Veronica Campbell-Brown won the women's 200 m, completing a Jamaican clean sweep of the sprint events.

Softball

- Japan defeated the United States 3–1 in the final of the women's softball tournament.

Volleyball

- American duo Kerri Walsh and Misty May-Treanor won the gold medal in the women's beach volleyball final, completing the tournament without dropping a single set and extending their unbeaten run in world competition to 108 matches.

Gold medalists
Sport	Event	Competitor(s)	NOC	Rec	Ref
Athletics	Men's 110 m hurdles	Dayron Robles	Cuba		
Athletics	Men's 400 m	LaShawn Merritt	United States		
Athletics	Men's triple jump	Nelson Évora	Portugal		
Athletics	Women's 200 m	Veronica Campbell-Brown	Jamaica		
Athletics	Women's 20 km walk	Olga Kaniskina	Russia	OR	
Athletics	Women's javelin throw	Barbora Špotáková	Czech Republic		
Diving	Women's 10 m platform	Chen Ruolin	China		
Equestrian	Individual jumping	Eric Lamaze	Canada		
Football	Women's football	Hope Solo, Nicole Barnhart, Heather Mitts, Christie Rampone, Rachel Buehler, Stephanie Cox, Kate Markgraf, Lori Chalupny, Lindsay Tarpley, Shannon Boxx, Heather O'Reilly, Aly Wagner, Carli Lloyd, Tobin Heath, Angela Hucles, Natasha Kai, Amy Rodriguez, Lauren Cheney	United States		
Modern pentathlon	Men's modern pentathlon	Andrey Moiseev	Russia		
Sailing	Star class	Iain Percy and Andrew Simpson	Great Britain		
Sailing	Tornado class	Antón Paz and Fernando Echavarri	Spain		
Softball	Women's softball	Naho Emoto, Motoko Fujimoto, Megu Hirose, Emi Inui, Sachiko Ito, Ayumi Karino, Satoko Mabuchi, Yukiyo Mine, Masumi Mishina, Rei Nishiyama, Hiroko Sakai, Rie Sato; Mika Someya, Yukiko Ueno, Eri Yamada	Japan		
Swimming	Men's marathon 10 km	Maarten van der Weijden	Netherlands		
Taekwondo	Men's 68 kg	Son Tae-Jin	South Korea		
Taekwondo	Women's 57 kg	Lim Su-Jeong	South Korea		
Volleyball	Women's beach volleyball	Kerri Walsh and Misty May-Treanor	United States		
Water polo	Women's water polo	Ilse van der Meijden, Yasemin Smit, Mieke Cabout, Biurakn Hakhverdian, Marieke van den Ham, Daniëlle de Bruijn, Iefke van Belkum, Noeki Klein, Gillian van den Berg, Alette Sijbring, Rianne Guichelaar, Simone Koot, Meike de Nooy	Netherlands		
Wrestling	Men's freestyle 84 kg	Revazi Mindorashvili	Georgia		
Wrestling	Men's freestyle 96 kg	Shirvani Muradov	Russia		
Wrestling	Men's freestyle 120 kg	Artur Taymazov	Uzbekistan		

=== Day 14: 22 August ===
Athletics

- Russia won the women's 4 × 100 m relay ahead of Belgium and Nigeria, but were disqualified on 16 August 2016 because a reanalysis of Yulia Chermoshanskaya’s samples resulted in a positive test for prohibited substances.
- The Jamaican men's team won the men's 4 × 100 m relay for the first time, setting a new world record time of 37.10 seconds. Usain Bolt, running the third leg, gained his third gold medal and third world record of the Beijing games, and became the first sprinter since 1984 to win the three sprint events in a single Olympiad.
- Tirunesh Dibaba of Ethiopia won her second gold medal of the Beijing games, claiming the women's 5000 m to go with her earlier victory in the 10000 m.
- Steven Hooker won Australia's first gold medal in men's athletics since 1968, in the men's pole vault.
- Maurren Higa Maggi won Brazil's first ever gold medal in any women's individual event, in the women's long jump.

Cycling

- Anne-Caroline Chausson of France and Māris Štrombergs of Latvia took the inaugural gold medals in BMX, winning the women's and men's events respectively.

Table tennis

- China won all three medals in the women's singles, with Zhang Yining defending her Olympic gold medal, Wang Nan taking silver, and Guo Yue bronze, leaving a competitor from Singapore in fourth place for the third consecutive Olympics.

Gold medalists
Sport	Event	Competitor(s)	NOC	Rec	Ref
Athletics	Men's 50 km walk	Alex Schwazer	Italy	OR	
Athletics	Men's 4 × 100 m relay	Nesta Carter, Michael Frater, Usain Bolt, Asafa Powell; Heats: Dwight Thomas	Jamaica	WR	
Athletics	Men's decathlon	Bryan Clay	United States		
Athletics	Men's pole vault	Steven Hooker	Australia	OR	
Athletics	Women's 5000 m	Tirunesh Dibaba	Ethiopia		
Athletics	Women's 4 × 100 m relay	Olivia Borlée, Hanna Mariën, Élodie Ouédraogo, Kim Gevaert	Belgium		
Athletics	Women's long jump	Maurren Higa Maggi	Brazil		
Canoeing	Men's C-1 1000 m	Attila Vajda	Hungary		
Canoeing	Men's K-1 1000 m	Tim Brabants	Great Britain		
Canoeing	Men's C-2 1000 m	Andrei Bahdanovich and Aliaksandr Bahdanovich	Belarus		
Canoeing	Men's K-2 1000 m	Martin Hollstein and Andreas Ihle	Germany		
Canoeing	Men's K-4 1000 m	Raman Piatrushenka, Aliaksei Abalmasau, Artur Litvinchuk, Vadzim Makhneu	Belarus		
Canoeing	Women's K-4 500 m	Fanny Fischer, Nicole Reinhardt, Katrin Wagner-Augustin, Conny Waßmuth	Germany		
Cycling	Men's BMX	Māris Štrombergs	Latvia		
Cycling	Women's BMX	Anne-Caroline Chausson	France		
Field hockey	Women's field hockey	Lisanne de Roever, Eefke Mulder, Fatima Moreira de Melo, Miek van Geenhuizen, Wieke Dijkstra, Maartje Goderie, Lidewij Welten, Minke Smabers, Minke Booij, Janneke Schopman, Maartje Paumen, Naomi van As, Ellen Hoog, Sophie Polkamp, Eva de Goede, Marilyn Agliotti	Netherlands		
Modern pentathlon	Women's modern pentathlon	Lena Schöneborn	Germany		
Table tennis	Women's singles	Zhang Yining	China		
Taekwondo	Men's 80 kg	Hadi Saei	Iran		
Taekwondo	Women's 67 kg	Hwang Kyung-Seon	South Korea		
Volleyball	Men's beach volleyball	Phil Dalhausser and Todd Rogers	United States		

=== Day 15: 23 August ===
Athletics

- Belgium's Tia Hellebaut won the women's high jump event, defeating the favourite and world champion Blanka Vlašić of Croatia and ending Vlasic's run of 38 wins in international competition.
- Sudan's Ismail Ahmed Ismail became his country's first Olympic medalist, taking silver in the men's 800 metres event.

Baseball

- South Korea beat the favorite Cuba to win gold.

Boxing

- Ukrainian Vasyl Lomachenko defeated Frenchman Khedafi Djelkhir in the first round of the gold medal fight in the featherweight category, the referee stopping the fight after less than two minutes after Djelkhir received his third standing count.
- Thai boxer Somjit Jongjohor won a gold medal in Flyweight boxing.
- Middleweight boxer James DeGale won a gold medal in the middleweight class which, together with bronze medals for super heavyweight David Price and light heavyweight Tony Jeffries was the best result for Great Britain in boxing since 1956.

Diving

- Australia's Matthew Mitcham won the men's 10 m platform gold medal with his final dive, preventing the Chinese team from winning every the diving event, and achieving the highest score for an individual dive in Olympic history.

Rhythmic Gymnastics

- Almudena Cid of Spain retired after her fourth Olympic games finals, and was the only rhythmic gymnast to compete in more than two.
- Evgenia Kanaeva of Russia finished first in every apparatus.

Table tennis

- The Chinese men followed the achievement of the women by taking all three medals, with Ma Lin winning the gold, Wang Hao winning the silver for the second successive Olympics, and Wang Liqin taking the bronze medal in the men's singles. China became the first country to win all the medals for which they are eligible in table tennis: gold, silver and bronze in the men's and women's singles, and gold in the men's and women's team tournaments.

Taekwondo

- South Korea won the gold medal in the men's 80 kg, with all four Korean athletes sent to Beijing taking gold.
- Ángel Matos of Cuba received a lifetime ban from taekwondo for assaulting the referee in the men's +80 kg event. Matos had been disqualified from his bronze medal bout for taking too long to return to the action after being injured.

Gold medalists
Sport	Event	Competitor(s)	NOC	Rec	Ref
Athletics	Men's 800 m	Wilfred Bungei	Kenya		
Athletics	Men's 5000 m	Kenenisa Bekele	Ethiopia	OR	
Athletics	Men's 4 × 400 m relay	LaShawn Merritt, Angelo Taylor, David Neville, Jeremy Wariner; Heats: Kerron Clement, Reggie Witherspoon	United States	OR	
Athletics	Men's javelin throw	Andreas Thorkildsen	Norway	OR	
Athletics	Women's 1500 m	Nancy Jebet Lagat	Kenya		
Athletics	Women's 4 × 400 m relay	Mary Wineberg, Allyson Felix, Monique Henderson, Sanya Richards; Heats: Natasha Hastings	United States		
Athletics	Women's high jump	Tia Hellebaut	Belgium		
Baseball	Men's baseball	Ryu Hyun-Jin, Han Ki-Joo, Park Jin-Man, Kwon Hyuk, Lee Taek-Keun, Lee Dae-Ho, Oh Seung-Hwan, Bong Jung-Keun, Ko Young-Min, Lee Jong-Wook, Jeong Keun-Woo, Kim Min-Jae, Jin Kab-Yong, Lee Jin-Young, Jang Won-Sam, Song Seung-Jun, Kim Kwang-Hyun, Lee Yong-Kyu, Kim Dong-Joo, Kang Min-Ho, Hyun-soo Kim, Lee Seung-Yeop, Chong Tae-Hyon, Yoon Suk-Min	South Korea		
Basketball	Women's basketball	Seimone Augustus, Sue Bird, Tamika Catchings, Sylvia Fowles, Kara Lawson, Lisa Leslie, DeLisha Milton-Jones, Candace Parker, Cappie Pondexter, Katie Smith, Diana Taurasi, Tina Thompson	United States		
Boxing	Flyweight	Somjit Jongjohor	Thailand		
Boxing	Featherweight	Vasyl Lomachenko	Ukraine		
Boxing	Light welterweight	Manuel Félix Díaz	Dominican Republic		
Boxing	Middleweight	James DeGale	Great Britain		
Boxing	Heavyweight	Rakhim Chakhkiev	Russia		
Canoeing	Men's C-1 500 m	Maxim Opalev	Russia		
Canoeing	Men's K-1 500 m	Ken Wallace	Australia		
Canoeing	Men's C-2 500 m	Meng Guanliang and Yang Wenjun	China		
Canoeing	Men's K-2 500 m	Saúl Craviotto and Carlos Pérez	Spain		
Canoeing	Women's K-1 500 m	Inna Osypenko-Radomska	Ukraine		
Canoeing	Women's K-2 500 m	Katalin Kovács and Natasa Janics	Hungary		
Cycling	Men's cross-country	Julien Absalon	France		
Cycling	Women's cross-country	Sabine Spitz	Germany		
Diving	Men's 10 m platform	Matthew Mitcham	Australia		
Field hockey	Men's field hockey	Philip Witte, Maximillian Mueller, Sebastian Biederlack, Carlos Nevado, Moritz Fuerste, Tobias Hauke, Tibor Weißenborn, Benjamin Weß, Niklas Meinert, Timo Weß, Oliver Korn, Christopher Zeller, Max Weinhold, Matthias Witthaus, Florian Keller, Philipp Zeller, Jan-Marco Montag	Germany		
Football	Men's football	Óscar Ustari, Ezequiel Garay, Luciano Fabián Monzón, Pablo Zabaleta, Fernando Gago, Federico Fazio, José Ernesto Sosa, Éver Banega, Ezequiel Lavezzi, Juan Román Riquelme, Ángel Di María, Nicolás Pareja, Lautaro Acosta, Javier Mascherano, Lionel Messi, Sergio Agüero, Diego Buonanotte, Sergio Romero, Nicolás Navarro	Argentina		
Gymnastics	Women's rhythmic individual all-around	Evgeniya Kanaeva	Russia		
Handball	Women's handball	Kari Aalvik Grimsbø, Katja Nyberg, Ragnhild Aamodt, Gøril Snorroeggen, Else Marthe Sørlie Lybekk, Tonje Nøstvold, Karoline Dyhre Breivang, Kristine Lunde, Gro Hammerseng, Kari Mette Johansen, Marit Malm Frafjord, Tonje Larsen, Katrine Lunde Haraldsen, Linn Kristin Riegelhuth	Norway		
Synchronized swimming	Women's team	Anastasia Davydova, Anastasia Ermakova, Maria Gromova, Natalia Ishchenko, Elvira Khasyanova, Olga Kuzhela, Yelena Ovchinnikova, Svetlana Romashina	Russia		
Table tennis	Men's singles	Ma Lin	China		
Taekwondo	Men's +80 kg	Cha Dong-Min	South Korea		
Taekwondo	Women's +67 kg	María del Rosario Espinoza	Mexico		
Volleyball	Women's volleyball	Oliveira Walewska, Carolina Albuquerque, Marianne Steinbrecher, Paula Pequeno, Thaisa Menezes, Hélia Souza, Valeska Menezes, Fabiana Claudino, Welissa Gonzaga, Jacqueline Carvalho, Sheilla Castro, Fabiana de Oliveira	Brazil		

=== Day 16: 24 August ===
General

- With the gold medal win by Zhang Xiaoping in the men's light heavyweight boxing, China won a total of 51 gold medals at this Olympic Games, the most for any NOC since the Soviet Union won 55 in 1988.

Water polo

- Hungary won a third consecutive gold medal in men's water polo .

Basketball

- The United States men's basketball team defeated world champions Spain 118–107 in the final.

Boxing

- Zou Shiming won China's first Olympic boxing gold medal, in the light flyweight category.
- Bakhyt Sarsekbayev of Kazakhstan defeated Cuba's Carlos Banteaux Suarez to win the welterweight category, with the result that traditional boxing power Cuba finishes the Beijing games without any gold medals in boxing.

Handball

- France won the 302nd and last gold medal of the Beijing Olympics, beating Iceland in the final of the men's handball.

Closing ceremony
The Closing Ceremony began at 8:00 pm China Standard Time (UTC+8). The number 8 is associated with prosperity and confidence in Chinese culture. The Closing Ceremony concluded at 9:55 pm CST.

Gold medalists
Sport	Event	Competitor(s)	NOC	Rec	Ref
Athletics	Men's marathon	Samuel Kamau Wanjiru	Kenya	OR	
Basketball	Men's basketball	Carlos Boozer, Jason Kidd, LeBron James, Deron Williams, Michael Redd, Dwyane Wade, Kobe Bryant, Dwight Howard, Chris Bosh, Chris Paul, Tayshaun Prince, Carmelo Anthony	United States		
Boxing	Light flyweight	Zou Shiming	China		
Boxing	Bantamweight	Enkhbatyn Badar-Uugan	Mongolia		
Boxing	Lightweight	Alexey Tishchenko	Russia		
Boxing	Welterweight	Bakhyt Sarsekbayev	Kazakhstan		
Boxing	Light heavyweight	Zhang Xiaoping	China		
Boxing	Super heavyweight	Roberto Cammarelle	Italy		
Gymnastics	Women's rhythmic team all-around	Margarita Aliychuk, Anna Gavrilenko, Tatiana Gorbunova, Elena Posevina, Daria Shkurikhina, Natalia Zueva	Russia		
Handball	Men's handball	Didier Dinart, Cédric Burdet, Guillaume Gille, Bertrand Gille, Daniel Narcisse, Olivier Girault, Daouda Karaboué, Nikola Karabatić, Christophe Kempe, Thierry Omeyer, Joël Abati, Luc Abalo, Michaël Guigou, Cédric Paty, Jérôme Fernandez	France		
Volleyball	Men's volleyball	Lloy Ball, Sean Rooney, David Lee, Richard Lambourne, William Priddy, Ryan Millar, Riley Salmon, Thomas Hoff, Clayton Stanley, Kevin Hansen, Gabriel Gardner, Scott Touzinsky	United States		
Water polo	Men's water polo	Zoltán Szécsi, Tamás Varga, Norbert Madaras, Dénes Varga, Tamás Kásás, Norbert Hosnyánszky, Gergely Kiss, Tibor Benedek, Dániel Varga, Péter Biros, Gábor Kis, Tamás Molnár, István Gergely	Hungary		

== See also ==
- 2008 Summer Olympics medal table
- Chronological summary of the 2008 Summer Paralympics
- Chronological summary of the 2010 Winter Olympics
