= Japan at the 2008 Summer Olympics =

- IOC code: JPN
- NOC: Japanese Olympic Committee
- Website: www.joc.or.jp (in Japanese and English)

in Beijing
- Competitors: 332 (167 men and 165 women) in 26 sports
- Flag bearers: Ai Fukuhara (opening); Kosuke Kitajima (closing)
- Medals Ranked 8th: Gold 9 Silver 8 Bronze 8 Total 25

Summer Olympics appearances (overview)
- 1912; 1920; 1924; 1928; 1932; 1936; 1948; 1952; 1956; 1960; 1964; 1968; 1972; 1976; 1980; 1984; 1988; 1992; 1996; 2000; 2004; 2008; 2012; 2016; 2020; 2024

Japan competed at the 2008 Summer Olympics in Beijing, People's Republic of China. The delegation of athletes and officials were represented by the Japanese Olympic Committee.

The list of qualified entries for Japan is shown. In some cases, the country qualified for a position in the Olympic Games, and the individual performance in the qualifying event was good enough to guarantee the same person a spot on Japan's team. In other cases, the Japan Olympic Committee assigned a competitor at a later date to fill some of the country's qualified positions, and the Olympic competitor may or may not be the same as the one who participated in the qualifying competition.

== Medalists ==
Medal	Name	Sport	Event	Date
Gold	Masato Uchishiba	Judo	Men's 66 kg	August 10
Gold	Kosuke Kitajima	Swimming	Men's 100 m breaststroke	August 11
Gold	Ayumi Tanimoto	Judo	Women's 63 kg	August 12
Gold	Masae Ueno	Judo	Women's 70 kg	August 13
Gold	Kosuke Kitajima	Swimming	Men's 200 m breaststroke	August 14
Gold	Satoshi Ishii	Judo	Men's +100 kg	August 15
Gold	Saori Yoshida	Wrestling	Women's freestyle 55 kg	August 16
Gold	Kaori Icho	Wrestling	Women's freestyle 63 kg	August 17
Gold	Naho Emoto; Motoko Fujimoto; Megu Hirose; Emi Inui; Sachiko Ito; Ayumi Karino; Satoko Mabuchi; Yukiyo Mine; Masumi Mishina; Rei Nishiyama; Hiroko Sakai; Rie Sato; Mika Someya; Yukiko Ueno; Eri Yamada	Softball	Tournaments	August 21
Silver	Takehiro Kashima; Takuya Nakase; Makoto Okiguchi; Koki Sakamoto; Hiroyuki Tomita; Kōhei Uchimura	Gymnastics	Team all-around	August 12
Silver	Yuki Ota	Fencing	Men's foil	August 13
Silver	Kōhei Uchimura	Gymnastics	Individual all-around	August 14
Silver	Maki Tsukada	Judo	Women's +78 kg	August 15
Silver	Chiharu Icho	Wrestling	Women's freestyle 48 kg	August 16
Silver	Tomohiro Matsunaga	Wrestling	Men's freestyle 55 kg	August 19
Silver	Kenichi Yumoto	Wrestling	Men's freestyle 60 kg	August 19
Silver	Naoki Tsukahara; Shingo Suetsugu; Shinji Takahira; Nobuharu Asahara	Athletics	Men's 4 × 100 m relay	August 22
Bronze	Ryoko Tani	Judo	Women's 48 kg	August 9
Bronze	Misato Nakamura	Judo	Women's 52 kg	August 10
Bronze	Takeshi Matsuda	Swimming	Men's 200 m butterfly	August 13
Bronze	Reiko Nakamura	Swimming	Women's 200 m backstroke	August 16
Bronze	Kiyofumi Nagai	Cycling	Keirin	August 16
Bronze	Junichi Miyashita; Kosuke Kitajima; Takuro Fujii; Hisayoshi Sato	Swimming	Men's 4 × 100 m medley relay	August 17
Bronze	Kyoko Hamaguchi	Wrestling	Women's freestyle 72 kg	August 17
Bronze	Saho Harada; Emiko Suzuki	Synchronized swimming	Women's duet	August 20

Medals by sport
Sport	1st place, gold medalist(s)	2nd place, silver medalist(s)	3rd place, bronze medalist(s)	Total
Judo	4	1	2	7
Wrestling	2	3	1	5
Swimming	2	0	3	5
Softball	1	0	0	1
Gymnastics	0	2	0	2
Athletics	0	1	0	1
Fencing	0	1	0	1
Cycling	0	0	1	1
Synchronized swimming	0	0	1	1
Total	9	8	8	25

== Archery ==
Japan qualified four archers (two men and two women) through the 2007 World Outdoor Target Championships individual competitions, and added a third women's qualification spot at the Asian Championships. This allowed Japan to compete in the women's team competition at the Olympics, as well as having three women and two men compete in the individual competitions. Takaharu Furukawa, Ryuichi Moriya, Nami Hayakawa, Sayoko Kitabatake and Yuki Hayashi were the archers who earned the qualification spots for Japan.

Japan has not yet won an Olympic gold medal in archery; its best results are a pair of silver medals, including Hiroshi Yamamoto's in the 2004 men's individual competition.

Men

Athlete	Event	Ranking round		Round of 64	Round of 32	Round of 16	Quarterfinals	Semifinals	Final / BM	
Athlete	Event	Score	Seed	Opposition Score	Opposition Score	Opposition Score	Opposition Score	Opposition Score	Opposition Score	Rank
Takaharu Furukawa	Individual	663	17	Kunda (BLR) (48); L 111 (18)–111 (19)	did not advance					
Ryuichi Moriya	Individual	661	22	Piatek (POL) (43); W 109 (10)–109 (9)	Wang C-P (TPE) (11); W 114–109	Tsyrempilov (RUS) (6); W 113–110	Ruban (UKR) (3); L 106–115	did not advance		

Women

Athlete	Event	Ranking round		Round of 64	Round of 32	Round of 16	Quarterfinals	Semifinals	Final / BM	
Athlete	Event	Score	Seed	Opposition Score	Opposition Score	Opposition Score	Opposition Score	Opposition Score	Opposition Score	Rank
Nami Hayakawa	Individual	649	9	Mousikou (CYP) (56); W 112–103	Nichols (USA) (24); W 105–103	Folkard (GBR) (8); W 106–97	Park S-H (KOR) (1); L 103–112	did not advance		
Yuki Hayashi	Individual	616	48	Esebua (GEO) (17); L 102 (8)–102 (9)	did not advance					
Sayoko Kitabatake	Individual	616	46	Mosypinek (POL) (19); W 103–101	Schuh (FRA) (14); L 100–112	did not advance				
Nami Hayakawa; Yuki Hayashi; Sayoko Kitabatake	Team	1881	7	—N/a		Colombia (10); W 206–199	Great Britain (2); L 196–201	did not advance		

== Athletics ==
Key

- Note–Ranks given for track events are within the athlete's heat only
- Q = Qualified for the next round
- q = Qualified for the next round as a fastest loser or, in field events, by position without achieving the qualifying target
- NR = National record
- N/A = Round not applicable for the event
- Bye = Athlete not required to compete in round

Men
Track & road events

Athlete	Event	Heat		Quarterfinal		Semifinal		Final	
Athlete	Event	Result	Rank	Result	Rank	Result	Rank	Result	Rank
Nobuharu Asahara	100 m	10.25	4 q	10.37	8	Did not advance			
Yoshitaka Iwamizu	3000 m steeplechase	8:29.80	9	—N/a				Did not advance	
Yuzo Kanemaru	400 m	46.39	7	—N/a		Did not advance			
Takayuki Matsumiya	5000 m	14:20.24	13	—N/a				Did not advance	
Takayuki Matsumiya	10000 m	—N/a						28:39.77	31
Koichiro Morioka	20 km walk	—N/a						1:21:57	16
Masato Naito	110 m hurdles	13.96	7	Did not advance					
Kenji Narisako	400 m hurdles	49.63	5	—N/a		Did not advance			
Tsuyoshi Ogata	Marathon	—N/a						2:13:26	13
Satoshi Osaki	Marathon	—N/a						DNS	
Atsushi Sato	Marathon	—N/a						2:41:08	76
Shingo Suetsugu	200 m	20.93	6	Did not advance					
Shinji Takahira	200 m	20.58	4 q	20.63	7	Did not advance			
Kensuke Takezawa	5000 m	13:49.42	7	—N/a				Did not advance	
Kensuke Takezawa	10000 m	—N/a						28:23.28	28
Dai Tamesue	400 m hurdles	49.82	4	—N/a		Did not advance			
Takayuki Tanii	20 km walk	—N/a						DSQ	
Takayuki Tanii	50 km walk	—N/a						4:01:37	29
Naoki Tsukahara	100 m	10.39	2 Q	10.23	3 Q	10.16	7	Did not advance	
Yuki Yamazaki	20 km walk	—N/a						1:21:18	11
Yuki Yamazaki	50 km walk	—N/a						3:45:47	7
Nobuharu Asahara; Shingo Suetsugu; Shinji Takahira; Naoki Tsukahara	4 × 100 m relay	38.52	2 Q	—N/a				38.15	2nd place, silver medalist(s)
Mitsuhiro Abiko; Yoshihiro Horigome; Kenji Narisako; Dai Tamesue	4 × 400 m relay	3:04.18	6	—N/a				Did not advance	

Field events

Athlete	Event	Qualification		Final	
Athlete	Event	Distance	Position	Distance	Position
Naoyuki Daigo	High jump	2.15	36	Did not advance	
Yukifumi Murakami	Javelin throw	78.21	15	Did not advance	
Koji Murofushi	Hammer throw	78.16	5 Q	80.71	5
Daichi Sawano	Pole vault	5.55	16	Did not advance	

Women
Track & road events

Athlete	Event	Heat		Quarterfinal		Semifinal		Final	
Athlete	Event	Result	Rank	Result	Rank	Result	Rank	Result	Rank
Yukiko Akaba	5000 m	15:38.30	12	—N/a				Did not advance	
Yukiko Akaba	10000 m	—N/a						32:00.37	20
Kayoko Fukushi	5000 m	15:20.46	10	—N/a				Did not advance	
Kayoko Fukushi	10000 m	—N/a						31:01.14	11
Chisato Fukushima	100 m	11.74	6	Did not advance					
Minori Hayakari	3000 m steeplechase	9:49.70	16	—N/a				Did not advance	
Mayumi Kawasaki	20 km walk	—N/a						1:29:43	14
Yuriko Kobayashi	5000 m	15:15.87	7	—N/a				Did not advance	
Sachiko Konishi	20 km walk	—N/a						1:32:21	26
Yurika Nakamura	Marathon	—N/a						2:30:19	13
Satomi Kubokura	400 m hurdles	55.82 SB	3 Q	—N/a		56.69	7	Did not advance	
Yoko Shibui	10000 m	—N/a						31:31.13	17
Asami Tanno	400 m	52.60	4	—N/a		Did not advance			
Reiko Tosa	Marathon	—N/a						DNF	
Sayaka Aoki; Mayu Kida; Satomi Kubokura; Asami Tanno	4 × 400 m relay	3:30.52 SB	8	—N/a				Did not advance	

Field events

Athlete	Event	Qualification		Final	
Athlete	Event	Distance	Position	Distance	Position
Kumiko Ikeda	Long jump	6.47	19	Did not advance	

== Badminton ==
Men

Athlete	Event	Round of 64	Round of 32	Round of 16	Quarterfinal	Semifinal	Final / BM	
Athlete	Event	Opposition Score	Opposition Score	Opposition Score	Opposition Score	Opposition Score	Opposition Score	Rank
Shoji Sato	Singles	Bye	Sridhar (IND); W 21–13, 21–17	Gade (DEN); L 21–19, 20–22, 15–21	Did not advance			
Shintaro Ikeda; Shuichi Sakamoto	Doubles	—N/a		Koo K K / Tan B H (MAS); L 12–21, 16–21	Did not advance			
Keita Masuda; Tadashi Ohtsuka	Doubles	—N/a		Hadiyanto / Yulianto (INA); W 19–21, 21–14, 21–14	Lee J-j / Hwang J-m (KOR); L 12–21, 21–18, 9–21	Did not advance		

Women

Athlete	Event	Round of 64	Round of 32	Round of 16	Quarterfinal	Semifinal	Final / BM	
Athlete	Event	Opposition Score	Opposition Score	Opposition Score	Opposition Score	Opposition Score	Opposition Score	Rank
Eriko Hirose	Singles	Ingólfsdóttir (ISL); W 21–6, 19–7^{r}	Nguyen (VIE); W 21–7, 21–12	Pi (FRA); L 12–21, 21–16, 6–21	Did not advance			
Miyuki Maeda; Satoko Suetsuna	Doubles	—N/a		Luiz / Tanaka (AUS); W 21–4, 21–8	Yang W / Zhang Jw (CHN); W 8–21, 23–21, 21–14	Lee K-w / Lee H-j (KOR); L 20–22, 15–21	Zhang Yw / Wei Yl (CHN); L 17–21, 10–21	4
Kumiko Ogura; Reiko Shiota	Doubles	—N/a		Kristiansen / Juhl (DEN); W 18–21, 21–14, 21–18	Du J / Yu Y (CHN); L 8–21, 5–21	Did not advance		

== Baseball ==
Japan's victory in the 2007 Asian Baseball Championship qualified the Japan national baseball team for Olympic competition. Japan, along with Cuba, has appeared in every Olympic baseball tournament since the sport was elevated to official status. Japan has reached the semifinals each year and taken one silver and two bronze medals, but has yet to win the Olympic championship.

Roster

Pitchers:

- Yu Darvish
- Kyuji Fujikawa
- Hitoki Iwase
- Kenshin Kawakami
- Yoshihisa Naruse
- Toshiya Sugiuchi
- Masahiro Tanaka
- Koji Uehara
- Tsuyoshi Wada
- Hideaki Wakui

Catchers:

- Shinnosuke Abe
- Tomoya Satozaki
- Akihiro Yano

Infielders:

- Takahiro Arai
- Masahiro Araki
- Munenori Kawasaki
- Shinya Miyamoto
- Shuichi Murata
- Hiroyuki Nakajima
- Tsuyoshi Nishioka

Outfielders:

- Norichika Aoki
- Atsunori Inaba
- Masahiko Morino
- G. G. Sato

Group stage

Team	1	2	3	4	5	6	7	8	9	R	H	E
Japan	0	0	1	0	1	0	0	0	0	2	9	1
Cuba	0	1	1	0	2	0	0	0	X	4	9	1
WP: Norge Luis Vera (1-0) LP: Yu Darvish (0-1) Sv: Pedro Luis Lazo (1)

Team	1	2	3	4	5	6	7	8	9	R	H	E
Netherlands	0	0	0	0	0	0	0	0	0	0	4	1
Japan	4	0	0	0	0	0	0	2	X	6	10	0
WP: Toshiya Sugiuchi (1-0) LP: Alexander Smit (0-1); Home runs: NED: None; JPN: Takahiko Sato (1)

Team	1	2	3	4	5	6	7	8	9	R	H	E
Japan	0	0	0	0	1	0	0	0	0	1	5	0
Canada	0	0	0	0	0	0	0	0	0	0	2	2
WP: Yoshihisa Naruse (1-0) LP: Chris Begg (1-1) Sv: Koji Uehara (1); Home runs: JPN: Atsunori Inaba (1); CAN: None

Team	1	2	3	4	5	6	7	8	9	10	11	R	H	E
United States	0	0	0	0	0	0	0	0	0	0	4	4	5	0
Japan	0	0	0	0	0	0	0	0	0	0	2	2	5	0
WP: Jeff Stevens (1-2) LP: Hitoki Iwase (0-2) Sv: Casey Weathers (1)

Team	1	2	3	4	5	6	7	8	9	R	H	E
Japan	0	0	0	0	1	1	0	0	4	6	9	1
Chinese Taipei	0	0	0	1	0	0	0	0	0	1	4	0
WP: Hideaki Wakui (1-0) LP: Fu-Te Ni (0-1); Home runs: JPN: Shinnosuke Abe (1); TPE: None

Team	1	2	3	4	5	6	7	8	9	R	H	E
South Korea	0	0	0	0	0	0	2	0	3	5	9	1
Japan	0	0	0	0	0	2	0	0	1	3	7	1
WP: Suk-Min Yoon (2-0) LP: Hitoki Iwase (0-1) Sv: Tae-Hyon Chong (1); Home runs: KOR: Dae-Ho Lee (2); JPN: Takahiro Arai (1)

Team	1	2	3	4	5	6	7	8	9	R	H	E
China	0	0	0	0	0	0	0	-	-	0	2	0
Japan	0	3	1	0	0	6	X	-	-	10	10	0
WP: Hideaki Wakui (2-0) LP: Nan Wang (0-1); Home runs: CHN: None; JPN: Tsuyoshi Nishioka (1)

Group table

Team	G	W	L	RS	RA	WIN%	GB	Tiebreaker
South Korea	7	7	0	41	22	1.000	-	-
Cuba	7	6	1	52	23	.857	1	-
United States	7	5	2	40	22	.714	2	-
Japan	7	4	3	30	14	.571	3	-
Chinese Taipei	7	2	5	29	33	.286	5	1-0
Canada	7	2	5	29	20	.286	5	0-1
Netherlands	7	1	6	9	50	.143	6	1-0
China	7	1	6	14	60	.143	6	0-1

Semifinal

Team	1	2	3	4	5	6	7	8	9	R	H	E
Japan	1	0	1	0	0	0	0	0	0	2	6	2
South Korea	0	0	0	1	0	0	1	4	X	6	10	1
WP: Kwang-Hyun Kim (1-0) LP: Hitoki Iwase (0-3); Home runs: JPN: None; KOR: Seung-Yeop Lee (1)

Bronze medal game

Team	1	2	3	4	5	6	7	8	9	R	H	E
Japan	1	0	3	0	0	0	0	0	0	4	6	1
United States	0	1	3	0	4	0	0	0	X	8	9	0
WP: Brett Anderson (1-0) LP: Kenshin Kawakami (0-1); Home runs: JPN: Masahiro Araki (1), Norichika Aoki (1); USA: Matt LaPorta (2), Matt Brown (2), Jason Donald (1)

== Boxing ==
Japan qualified two boxers for the Olympic boxing tournament. Masatsugu was the first when he qualified at the World Championships. Satoshi was the second, qualifying at the first Asian qualifying event.

Athlete	Event	Round of 32	Round of 16	Quarterfinals	Semifinals	Final	
Athlete	Event	Opposition Result	Opposition Result	Opposition Result	Opposition Result	Opposition Result	Rank
Satoshi Shimizu	Featherweight	Bye	Kılıç (TUR); L 9–12	Did not advance			
Masatsugu Kawachi	Light welterweight	Bye	Boonjumnong (THA); L 1–8	Did not advance			

== Canoeing ==
=== Slalom ===
Athlete	Event	Preliminary						Semifinal		Final			
Athlete	Event	Run 1	Rank	Run 2	Rank	Total	Rank	Time	Rank	Time	Rank	Total	Rank
Takuya Haneda	Men's C-1	94.08	13	92.24	14	186.32	14	Did not advance					
Kazuki Yazawa	Men's K-1	89.82	19	90.05	18	179.87	18	Did not advance					
Hiroyuki Nagao; Masatoshi Sanma	Men's C-2	99.47	8	113.09	10	212.56	10 Q	110.10	9	Did not advance			
Yuriko Takeshita	Women's K-1	111.63	14	113.08	18	224.71	15 Q	107.86	6 Q	111.44	4	219.30	4

=== Sprint ===
Athlete	Event	Heats		Semifinals		Final	
Athlete	Event	Time	Rank	Time	Rank	Time	Rank
Shinobu Kitamoto	Women's K-1 500 m	1:52.148	4 QS	2:01.105	9	Did not advance	
Shinobu Kitamoto; Mikiko Takeya	Women's K-2 500 m	1:46.980	6 QS	1:43.541	1 Q	1:43.291	5
Shinobu Kitamoto; Ayaka Kuno; Yumiko Suzuki; Mikiko Takeya	Women's K-4 500 m	1:38.618	5 QS	1:37.449	2 Q	1:36.465	6

Qualification Legend: QS = Qualify to semi-final; QF = Qualify directly to final

== Cycling ==
=== Road ===
Athlete	Event	Time	Rank
Fumiyuki Beppu	Men's road race	Did not finish	
Fumiyuki Beppu	Men's time trial	1:11:05	39
Takashi Miyazawa	Men's road race	6:55:24	85
Miho Oki	Women's road race	3:33:17	31

=== Track ===
Japan has qualified entries in men's Keirin, sprint, team sprint and points race, and women's points race and sprint.

Sprint

Athlete	Event	Qualification		Round 1	Repechage 1	Round 2	Repechage 2	Quarterfinals	Semifinals	Final	
Athlete	Event	Time Speed (km/h)	Rank	Opposition Time Speed (km/h)	Opposition Time Speed (km/h)	Opposition Time Speed (km/h)	Opposition Time Speed (km/h)	Opposition Time Speed (km/h)	Opposition Time Speed (km/h)	Opposition Time Speed (km/h)	Rank
Tsubasa Kitatsuru	Men's sprint	10.391; 69.290	14	Bourgain (FRA); L	Awang (MAS); Kwiatkowski (POL); L	Did not advance					
Kazunari Watanabe	Men's sprint	10.346; 69.592	11	Chiappa (ITA); L	Blatchford (USA); Zhang L (CHN); W 10.965; 65.663	Hoy (GBR); L	Sireau (FRA); Bayley (AUS); L	Did not advance		9th place final Nimke (GER); Chiappa (ITA); Bayley (AUS); L	12
Kiyofumi Nagai; Tomohiro Nagatsuka; Kazunari Watanabe	Men's team sprint	44.454; 60.736	6	Germany; L 44.437; 60.760	—N/a					Did not advance	6
Sakie Tsukuda	Women's sprint	12.134; 59.337	12	Pendleton (GBR); L	Tsylinskaya (BLR); Guerra (CUB); L	—N/a		Did not advance		9th place final Grankovskaya (RUS); Guerra (CUB); Hijgenaar (NED); L	12

Keirin

Athlete	Event	1st round	Repechage	2nd round	Final
Athlete	Event	Rank	Rank	Rank	Rank
Toshiaki Fushimi	Men's keirin	3 R	4	Did not advance	
Kiyofumi Nagai	Men's keirin	3 R	1 Q	2 Q	3rd place, bronze medalist(s)

Omnium

Athlete	Event	Points	Laps	Rank
Makoto Iijima	Men's points race	23	1	8
Satomi Wadami	Women's points race	Did not finish		

=== Mountain biking ===
Athlete	Event	Time	Rank
Kohei Yamamoto	Men's cross-country	LAP (3 lap)	46
Rie Katayama	Women's cross-country	LAP (1 lap)	20

=== BMX ===
Athlete	Event	Seeding		Quarterfinals		Semifinals		Final	
Athlete	Event	Result	Rank	Points	Rank	Points	Rank	Result	Rank
Akifumi Sakamoto	Men's BMX	40.548	32	19	7	Did not advance			

== Diving ==
One Japanese member qualified for the 3 meter springboard event, by virtue of Ken Terauchi's third-place finish in the semifinal round at the 2007 World Championships. This was the first individual qualification spot earned by Japan for the 2008 Olympics.

Men

Athlete	Event	Preliminaries		Semifinals		Final	
Athlete	Event	Points	Rank	Points	Rank	Points	Rank
Ken Terauchi	3 m springboard	452.80	10 Q	478.25	7 Q	442.50	11

Women

Athlete	Event	Preliminaries		Semifinals		Final	
Athlete	Event	Points	Rank	Points	Rank	Points	Rank
Mai Nakagawa	10 m platform	331.40	9 Q	314.60	10 Q	296.30	11

== Equestrian ==
=== Dressage ===
Athlete	Horse	Event	Grand Prix		Grand Prix Special		Grand Prix Freestyle		Overall	
Athlete	Horse	Event	Score	Rank	Score	Rank	Score	Rank	Score	Rank
Hiroshi Hoketsu	Whisper	Individual	62.542	35	Did not advance					
Yuko Kitai	Rambo	Individual	59.250	45	Did not advance					
Mieko Yagi	Dow Jones	Individual	60.167	42	Did not advance					
Hiroshi Hoketsu; Yuko Kitai; Mieko Yagi	See above	Team	—N/a						60.653	9

=== Eventing ===
Athlete	Horse	Event	Dressage		Cross-country			Jumping						Total	
Athlete	Horse	Event	Dressage		Cross-country			Qualifier			Final			Total	
Athlete	Horse	Event	Penalties	Rank	Penalties	Total	Rank	Penalties	Total	Rank	Penalties	Total	Rank	Penalties	Rank
Yoshiaki Oiwa	Gorgeous George	Individual	52.40	40	76.40	128.80	55	8.00	136.80	49	Did not advance			136.80	49

=== Show jumping ===
Athlete	Horse	Event	Qualification								Final					Total	
Athlete	Horse	Event	Round 1		Round 2			Round 3			Round A		Round B			Total	
Athlete	Horse	Event	Penalties	Rank	Penalties	Total	Rank	Penalties	Total	Rank	Penalties	Rank	Penalties	Total	Rank	Penalties	Rank
Eiken Sato	Cayak	Individual	1	14	24	25	51	Did not advance								25	51
Taizo Sugitani	California	Individual	0	=1	17	17	37 Q	9	26	37 Q	12	29	Did not advance			12	29

Taizo Sugitani finished qualifying in 37th place which made him a reserve rider for the final. After several qualified horses tested positive for use of capsaicin, he was moved up and participated in Final A.

== Fencing ==
Men

Athlete	Event	Round of 64	Round of 32	Round of 16	Quarterfinal	Semifinal	Final / BM	
Athlete	Event	Opposition Score	Opposition Score	Opposition Score	Opposition Score	Opposition Score	Opposition Score	Rank
Shogo Nishida	Individual épée	Inostroza (CHI); L 11–15	Did not advance					
Kenta Chida	Individual foil	—N/a	Lau K K (HKG); W 15–6	Kleibrink (GER); L 10–15	Did not advance			
Yuki Ota	Individual foil	—N/a	Souza (BRA); W 15–4	Choi B-C (KOR); W 15–14	Joppich (GER); W 15–12	Sanzo (ITA); W 15–14	Kleibrink (GER); L 9–15	2nd place, silver medalist(s)
Satoshi Ogawa	Individual sabre	Keita (SEN); L 14–15	Did not advance					

Women

Athlete	Event	Round of 64	Round of 32	Round of 16	Quarterfinal	Semifinal	Final / BM	
Athlete	Event	Opposition Score	Opposition Score	Opposition Score	Opposition Score	Opposition Score	Opposition Score	Rank
Megumi Harada	Individual épée	—N/a	Parkinson (AUS); W 15–9	Brânză (ROU); L 11–15	Did not advance			
Chieko Sugawara	Individual foil	Bye	Jung G-O (KOR); W 11–9	Golubytskyi (GER); W 6–5	Nam H-H (KOR); L 10–15	Did not advance		
Madoka Hisagae	Individual sabre	Bye	Dyachenko (RUS); L 10–15	Did not advance				

== Field hockey ==
=== Women's tournament ===
Team roster

The following is the Japanese roster in the women's field hockey tournament of the 2008 Summer Olympics.

Head Coach: Yoo Seung-Jin

1. Ikuko Okamura (GK)
2. Keiko Miura
4. Mayumi Ono
5. Chie Kimura
6. Rika Komazawa
7. Miyuki Nakagawa
8. Sakae Morimoto
9. Kaori Chiba
10. Yukari Yamamoto
11. Toshie Tsukui
13. Sachimi Iwao
14. Akemi Kato (c)
15. Tomomi Komori
18. Misaki Ozawa
20. Chinami Kozakura
22. Yuka Yoshikawa (GK)

Reserve:

3. Hikari Suwa
19. Nichika Urata

Group play

Team	Pld	W	D	L	GF	GA	GD	Pts	Qualification
Germany	5	4	0	1	12	8	+4	12	Advanced to semifinals
Argentina	5	3	2	0	13	7	+6	11	Advanced to semifinals
Great Britain	5	2	2	1	7	9	−2	8	
United States	5	1	3	1	9	8	+1	6	
Japan	5	1	1	3	5	7	−2	4	
New Zealand	5	0	0	5	6	13	−7	0	

10 August 2008
08:30

Japan	2–1	New Zealand
Morimoto 12'; Tsukui 17'	Report	Claxton 25'

Umpires:
Lee Keum-ju (KOR)
Minka Woolley (AUS)

12 August 2008
18:00

United States	1–1	Japan
Barber 58'	Report	Chiba 12'

Umpires:
Sarah Garnett (NZL)
Lisa Roach (AUS)

14 August 2008
18:30

Japan	1–2	Argentina
Miura 64'	Report	Gulla 38'; Burkart 51'

Umpires:
Miao Lin (CHN)
Gina Spitaleri (ITA)

16 August 2008
20:30

Great Britain	2–1	Japan
Panter 32'; Cullen 70'	Report	Miura 58'

Umpires:
Minka Woolley (AUS)
Carol Metchette (IRL)

18 August 2008
08:30

Germany	1–0	Japan
Beermann 40'	Report

Umpires:
Julie Ashton-Lucy (AUS)
Miao Lin (CHN)

9th–10th place

20 August 2008
08:30

South Korea	2–1	Japan
Park Jeong-sook 12', 49'	Report	Komazawa 43'

Umpires:
Gina Spitaleri (ITA)
Lisa Roach (AUS)

== Football (soccer) ==
=== Men's tournament ===
Roster

The following is the Japan squad in the men's football tournament of the 2008 Summer Olympics.

Head coach: Yasuharu Sorimachi

No.	Pos.	Player	Date of birth (age)	Caps	Goals	Club
1	GK	Shusaku Nishikawa	18 June 1986 (aged 22)	0	0	(Japan Football Association) Oita Trinita
2	MF	Hajime Hosogai	10 June 1986 (aged 22)	0	0	(Japan Football Association) Urawa Red Diamonds
3	DF	Maya Yoshida	24 August 1988 (aged 19)	0	0	(Japan Football Association) Nagoya Grampus
4	DF	Hiroki Mizumoto (c)	12 September 1985 (aged 22)	1	0	(Japan Football Association) Kyoto Sanga
5	DF	Yuto Nagatomo	12 September 1986 (aged 21)	3	0	(Japan Football Association) FC Tokyo
6	DF	Masato Morishige	21 May 1987 (aged 21)	0	0	(Japan Football Association) Oita Trinita
7	DF	Atsuto Uchida	27 March 1988 (aged 20)	9	1	(Japan Football Association) Kashima Antlers
8	MF	Keisuke Honda	13 June 1986 (aged 22)	1	0	(Royal Dutch Football Association) VVV-Venlo
9	FW	Yohei Toyoda	11 April 1985 (aged 23)	0	0	(Japan Football Association) Montedio Yamagata
10	MF	Yohei Kajiyama	24 September 1985 (aged 22)	0	0	(Japan Football Association) FC Tokyo
11	FW	Shinji Okazaki	16 April 1986 (aged 22)	0	0	(Japan Football Association) Shimizu S-Pulse
12	MF	Hiroyuki Taniguchi	27 June 1985 (aged 23)	0	0	(Japan Football Association) Kawasaki Frontale
13	DF	Michihiro Yasuda	20 December 1987 (aged 20)	5	0	(Japan Football Association) Gamba Osaka
14	FW	Shinji Kagawa	17 March 1989 (aged 19)	3	0	(Japan Football Association) Cerezo Osaka
15	FW	Takayuki Morimoto	7 May 1988 (aged 20)	0	0	(Italian Football Federation) Catania
16	MF	Takuya Honda	17 April 1985 (aged 23)	0	0	(Japan Football Association) Shimizu S-Pulse
17	FW	Tadanari Lee	19 December 1985 (aged 22)	0	0	(Japan Football Association) Kashiwa Reysol
18	GK	Kaito Yamamoto	10 July 1985 (aged 23)	0	0	(Japan Football Association) Shimizu S-Pulse

* Over-aged player.

Group play

Pos	Team	Pld	W	D	L	GF	GA	GD	Pts	Qualification
1	Nigeria	3	2	1	0	4	2	+2	7	Qualified for the quarterfinals
2	Netherlands	3	1	2	0	3	2	+1	5	Qualified for the quarterfinals
3	United States	3	1	1	1	4	4	0	4	
4	Japan	3	0	0	3	1	4	−3	0	

7 August 2008
17:00

Japan	0–1	United States
	Report	Holden 47'

Tianjin Olympic Center Stadium, Tianjin
Attendance: 57,102
Referee: Badara Diatta (Senegal)
10 August 2008
17:00

Nigeria	2–1	Japan
Obinna 58'; Anichebe 74'	Report	Toyoda 79'

Tianjin Olympic Center Stadium, Tianjin
Attendance: 42,592
Referee: Masoud Moradi (Iran)
13 August 2008
17:00

Netherlands	1–0	Japan
Sibon 73' (pen.)	Report

Shenyang Olympic Stadium, Shenyang
Attendance: 38,790
Referee: Héctor Baldassi (Argentina)

=== Women's tournament ===
Roster

Head coach: Norio Sasaki

Japan named a squad of 18 players and 4 alternates for the tournament.

No.	Pos.	Player	Date of birth (age)	Caps	Goals	Club
1	GK	Miho Fukumoto	2 October 1983 (aged 24)	39	0	(Japan Football Association) Okayama Yunogo Belle
2	DF	Yukari Kinga	2 May 1984 (aged 24)	29	0	(Japan Football Association) NTV Beleza
3	DF	Hiromi Ikeda (captain)	22 December 1975 (aged 32)	112	4	(Japan Football Association) Tasaki Perule
4	DF	Azusa Iwashimizu	14 October 1986 (aged 21)	33	5	(Japan Football Association) NTV Beleza
5	MF	Miyuki Yanagita	11 April 1981 (aged 27)	86	11	(Japan Football Association) Urawa Reds Ladies
6	MF	Tomoe Kato	27 May 1978 (aged 30)	112	8	(Japan Football Association) NTV Beleza
7	DF	Kozue Ando	9 July 1982 (aged 26)	61	10	(Japan Football Association) Urawa Reds Ladies
8	MF	Aya Miyama	28 January 1985 (aged 23)	60	18	(Japan Football Association) Okayama Yunogo Belle
9	FW	Eriko Arakawa	30 October 1979 (aged 28)	62	19	(Japan Football Association) NTV Beleza
10	MF	Homare Sawa	6 September 1978 (aged 29)	136	68	(Japan Football Association) NTV Beleza
11	FW	Shinobu Ohno	23 January 1984 (aged 24)	57	22	(Japan Football Association) NTV Beleza
12	FW	Karina Maruyama	26 March 1983 (aged 25)	50	12	(Japan Football Association) TEPCO Mareeze
13	MF	Ayumi Hara	21 February 1979 (aged 29)	36	1	(Japan Football Association) INAC Leonessa
14	DF	Kyoko Yano	3 June 1984 (aged 24)	44	1	(Japan Football Association) Urawa Reds Ladies
15	MF	Mizuho Sakaguchi	15 October 1987 (aged 20)	21	14	(Japan Football Association) Tasaki Perule
16	MF	Rumi Utsugi	5 December 1988 (aged 19)	23	4	(Japan Football Association) NTV Beleza
17	FW	Yūki Nagasato	15 July 1987 (aged 21)	44	25	(Japan Football Association) NTV Beleza
18	GK	Ayumi Kaihori	4 September 1986 (aged 21)	2	0	(Japan Football Association) INAC Leonessa

Group play

Pos	Team	Pld	W	D	L	GF	GA	GD	Pts	Qualification
1	United States	3	2	0	1	5	2	+3	6	Qualified for the quarterfinals
2	Norway	3	2	0	1	4	5	−1	6	Qualified for the quarterfinals
3	Japan	3	1	1	1	7	4	+3	4	Qualified for the quarterfinals
4	New Zealand	3	0	1	2	2	7	−5	1	

6 August 2008
17:00

Japan	2–2	New Zealand
Miyama 72' (pen.); Sawa 86'	Report	Yallop 37'; Hearn 56' (pen.)

Qinhuangdao Olympic Sports Center Stadium, Qinhuangdao
Attendance: 10,270
Referee: Deidre Mitchell (South Africa)
9 August 2008
17:00

United States	1–0	Japan
Lloyd 27'	Report

Qinhuangdao Olympic Sports Center Stadium, Qinhuangdao
Attendance: 16,912
Referee: Pannipar Kamnueng (Thailand)
12 August 2008
19:45

Norway	1–5	Japan
Knutsen 27'	Report	Kinga 31'; Følstad 51' (o.g.); Ohno 52'; Sawa 71'; Hara 83'

Shanghai Stadium, Shanghai
Attendance: 16,872
Referee: Shane de Silva (Trinidad and Tobago)

Quarterfinals

15 August 2008
21:00

China	0–2	Japan
	Report	Sawa 15'; Nagasato 80'

Qinhuangdao Olympic Sports Center Stadium, Qinhuangdao
Attendance: 28,459
Referee: Christine Beck (Germany)

Semifinals

18 August 2008
21:00

Japan	2–4	United States
Ohno 16'; Arakawa 90+3'	Report	Hucles 41', 80'; Chalupny 44'; O'Reilly 70'

Beijing Workers' Stadium, Beijing
Attendance: 50,937
Referee: Nicole Petignat (Switzerland)

Bronze medal game

21 August 2008
18:00

(bronze) Germany	2–0	Japan
Bajramaj 68', 87'	Report

Beijing Workers' Stadium, Beijing
Attendance: 49,285
Referee: Estela Álvarez (Argentina)

Final rank

4th place

== Gymnastics ==
=== Artistic ===
Men
Team

Athlete	Event	Qualification								Final							
Athlete	Event	Apparatus						Total	Rank	Apparatus						Total	Rank
Athlete	Event	F	PH	R	V	PB	HB	Total	Rank	F	PH	R	V	PB	HB	Total	Rank
Takehiro Kashima	Team	—N/a	14.425	—N/a	15.975	15.550	15.150	—N/a		—N/a	15.575	—N/a	15.200	—N/a			
Takuya Nakase	Team	15.500	14.075	15.275	—N/a	15.725	15.450 Q	—N/a		15.000	—N/a	15.425	—N/a		15.525	—N/a	
Makoto Okiguchi	Team	15.275	—N/a		15.750	—N/a				15.275	—N/a						
Koki Sakamoto	Team	14.950	14.925	15.525	16.200	15.625	14.725	91.950	5*	—N/a	14.850	15.525	15.400	15.000	—N/a		
Hiroyuki Tomita	Team	15.175	15.175 Q	15.025	15.200	15.775	15.550 Q	91.900	6 Q	—N/a	15.150	15.950	—N/a	16.150	15.625	—N/a	
Kōhei Uchimura	Team	15.725	14.100	14.675	16.200	16.025	15.325	92.050	4 Q	15.700	—N/a		16.150	15.925	15.450	—N/a	
Total	Team	61.675	58.625	60.500	64.125	63.150	61.475	369.550	2 Q	45.975	45.575	46.900	46.750	47.075	46.600	278.875	2nd place, silver medalist(s)

*Due to a coaching decision, Hiroyuki Tomita started in the individual all-around final instead of Koki Sakamoto. Tomita had finished qualification in 6th place, but behind his teammates Uchimura and Sakamoto, and no more than two gymnasts from the same nation are allowed in the final.

Individual finals

Athlete	Event	Apparatus						Total	Rank
Athlete	Event	F	PH	R	V	PB	HB	Total	Rank
Takuya Nakase	Horizontal bar	—N/a					15.450	15.450	5
Koki Sakamoto	All-around	Withdrew due to coaching decision							
Hiroyuki Tomita	All-around	15.100	15.425	13.850	16.200	16.000	15.675	91.750	4
Hiroyuki Tomita	Pommel horse	—N/a	15.375	—N/a				15.375	5
Hiroyuki Tomita	Horizontal bar	—N/a					15.225	15.225	6
Kōhei Uchimura	All-around	15.825	13.275	15.200	16.300	15.975	15.400	91.975	2nd place, silver medalist(s)
Kōhei Uchimura	Floor	15.575	—N/a					15.575	5

Women
Team

Athlete	Event	Qualification						Final					
Athlete	Event	Apparatus				Total	Rank	Apparatus				Total	Rank
Athlete	Event	F	V	UB	BB	Total	Rank	F	V	UB	BB	Total	Rank
Mayu Kuroda	Team	—N/a		14.725	14.850	—N/a		—N/a		15.350	14.725	—N/a	
Yu Minobe	Team	13.825	14.050	14.525	—N/a			did not compete					
Kyoko Oshima	Team	14.175	14.700	14.450	14.300	57.625	27 Q	14.450	14.450	14.750	—N/a		
Yuko Shintake	Team	14.175	14.675	—N/a	15.050	—N/a		14.025	14.625	—N/a	15.000	—N/a	
Koko Tsurumi	Team	14.325	14.200	15.025	15.425	58.975	17 Q	14.200	—N/a	15.425	15.225	—N/a	
Miki Uemura	Team	12.875	14.475	12.775	14.575	54.700	50	—N/a	14.475	—N/a			
Total	Team	56.500	58.050	58.725	59.900	233.175	8 Q	42.675	43.550	45.525	44.950	176.700	5

Individual finals

Athlete	Event	Apparatus				Total	Rank
Athlete	Event	F	V	UB	BB	Total	Rank
Kyoko Oshima	All-around	14.400	14.575	14.675	14.975	57.625	20
Koko Tsurumi	All-around	13.675	14.075	14.950	15.400	58.100	17
Koko Tsurumi	Balance beam	—N/a			14.450	14.450	8

Kyoko Oshima qualified for the All-Around final of the top 24 gymnasts because the number of finalists from the same nation is limited to two. Thus, five gymnasts ranked ahead of her were ineligible. For the same reason, Koko Tsurumi appeared in the balance beam apparatus final.

=== Rhythmic ===
Japan have qualified a rhythmic gymnastics group.

Athlete	Event	Qualification				Final			
Athlete	Event	5 ropes	3 hoops 2 clubs	Total	Rank	5 ropes	3 hoops 2 clubs	Total	Rank
Yuko Endo; Chihana Hara; Saori Inagaki; Nachi Misawa; Kotono Tanaka; Honami Tsuboi	Team	15.425	15.425	30.850	10	did not advance			

=== Trampoline ===
Athlete	Event	Qualification		Final	
Athlete	Event	Score	Rank	Score	Rank
Tetsuya Sotomura	Men's	70.30	5 Q	39.80	4
Yasuhiro Ueyama	Men's	69.20	9	did not advance	
Haruka Hirota	Women's	62.60	12	did not advance	

== Judo ==
Men

Athlete	Event	Preliminary	Round of 32	Round of 16	Quarterfinals	Semifinals	Repechage 1	Repechage 2	Repechage 3	Final / BM	
Athlete	Event	Opposition Result	Opposition Result	Opposition Result	Opposition Result	Opposition Result	Opposition Result	Opposition Result	Opposition Result	Opposition Result	Rank
Hiroaki Hiraoka	−60 kg	Bye	Williams-Murray (USA); L 0000–0001	did not advance							
Masato Uchishiba	−66 kg	Bye	Jimenez (DOM); W 1001–0000	Miresmaeili (IRI); W 0020–0000	Sharipov (UZB); W 0201–0010	Arencibia (CUB); W 0020–0001	Bye			Darbelet (FRA); W 1000–0000	1st place, gold medalist(s)
Yusuke Kanamaru	−73 kg	—N/a	Maloumat (IRI); L 0001–1001	did not advance			Pina (POR); W 0011–0010	Dashdavaa (MGL); W 0100–0000	van Tichelt (BEL); L 0000–0211	did not advance	
Takashi Ono	−81 kg	Bye	Camilo (BRA); L 0000–0120	did not advance							
Hiroshi Izumi	−90 kg	—N/a	Kelly (AUS); W 0010–0000	Kazusionak (BLR); L 0000–1000	did not advance						
Keiji Suzuki	−100 kg	—N/a	Naidangiin (MGL); L 0000–1000	did not advance			Behrla (GER); L 0000–1000	did not advance			
Satoshi Ishii	+100 kg	Bye	Bianchessi (ITA); W 1011–0000	El Shehaby (EGY); W 1001–0000	Tmenov (RUS); W 1001–0000	Gujejiani (GEO); W 1011–0000	Bye			Tangriev (UZB); W 0010–0000	1st place, gold medalist(s)

Women

Athlete	Event	Round of 32	Round of 16	Quarterfinals	Semifinals	Repechage 1	Repechage 2	Repechage 3	Final / BM	
Athlete	Event	Opposition Result	Opposition Result	Opposition Result	Opposition Result	Opposition Result	Opposition Result	Opposition Result	Opposition Result	Rank
Ryoko Tani	−48 kg	Matsumoto (USA); W 0020–0000	Wu Sg (CHN); W 0100–0000	Pareto (ARG); W 0001–0000	Dumitru (ROU); L 0010–0100	Bye			Bogdanova (RUS); W 1000–0000	3rd place, bronze medalist(s)
Misato Nakamura	−52 kg	Bye	Tarangul (GER); W 0001–0000	Heylen (BEL); W 0001–0000	An K-A (PRK); L 0000–0001	Bye			Kim K-O (KOR); W 0200–0000	3rd place, bronze medalist(s)
Aiko Sato	−57 kg	Bye	Gasimova (AZE); W 1001–0100	Xu Y (CHN); L 0002–0010	Did not advance	Bye	Koivumäki (FIN); W 1011–0000	Quadros (BRA); L 0000–1000	did not advance	
Ayumi Tanimoto	−63 kg	Bye	Barreto (VEN); W 1000–0000	Kong J-Y (KOR); W 1000–0001	Gonzalez (CUB); W 1011–0000	Bye			Décosse (FRA); W 1000–0000	1st place, gold medalist(s)
Masae Ueno	−70 kg	Park K-Y (KOR); W 1010–0000	Wang J (CHN); W 1011–0001	Meszaros (HUN); W 0200–0000	Bosch (NED); W 0110–0001	Bye			Hernandez (CUB); W 1000–0000	1st place, gold medalist(s)
Sae Nakazawa	−78 kg	Bye	Morico (ITA); L 0001–0010	did not advance						
Maki Tsukada	+78 kg	Bye	Mondiere (FRA); W 1000–0001	Zambotti (MEX); W 1000–0000	Polavder (SLO); W 1010–0000	Bye			Tong W (CHN); L 0010–1001	2nd place, silver medalist(s)

== Modern pentathlon ==
Athlete	Event	Shooting (10 m air pistol)			Fencing (épée one touch)			Swimming (200 m freestyle)			Riding (show jumping)			Running (3000 m)			Total points	Final rank
Athlete	Event	Points	Rank	MP Points	Results	Rank	MP points	Time	Rank	MP points	Penalties	Rank	MP points	Time	Rank	MP Points	Total points	Final rank
Yoshihiro Murakami	Men's	181	19	1108	12–23	33	688	2:10.74	31	1232	220	21	980	10:56.35	36	736	4744	31

== Rowing ==
Men

Athlete	Event	Heats		Repechage		Semifinals		Final	
Athlete	Event	Time	Rank	Time	Rank	Time	Rank	Time	Rank
Daisaku Takeda; Kazushige Ura	Lightweight double sculls	6:24.21	4 R	6:43.03	3 SC/D	6:29.30	1 FC	6:23.02	13

Women

Athlete	Event	Heats		Repechage		Semifinals		Final	
Athlete	Event	Time	Rank	Time	Rank	Time	Rank	Time	Rank
Akiko Iwamoto; Misaki Kumakura	Lightweight double sculls	7:05.67	3 R	7:30.92	3 SA/B	7:16.13	6 FB	7:08.49	9

Qualification Legend: FA=Final A (medal); FB=Final B (non-medal); FC=Final C (non-medal); FD=Final D (non-medal); FE=Final E (non-medal); FF=Final F (non-medal); SA/B=Semifinals A/B; SC/D=Semifinals C/D; SE/F=Semifinals E/F; QF=Quarterfinals; R=Repechage

== Sailing ==
Men

Athlete	Event	Race											Net points	Final rank
Athlete	Event	1	2	3	4	5	6	7	8	9	10	M*	Net points	Final rank
Makoto Tomizawa	RS:X	6	20	6	14	7	23	8	~~DSQ~~	12	2	18	116	10
Yoichi Iijima	Laser	36	32	16	17	31	~~BFD~~	31	DNF	28	CAN	EL	235	35
Tetsuya Matsunaga; Taro Ueno	470	1	20	~~24~~	13	10	14	1	9	21	4	4	97	7

Women

Athlete	Event	Race											Net points	Final rank
Athlete	Event	1	2	3	4	5	6	7	8	9	10	M*	Net points	Final rank
Yasuko Kosuge	RS:X	9	12	4	17	14	~~18~~	18	11	10	7	EL	102	13
Naoko Kamata; Ai Kondo	470	13	~~15~~	14	15	14	1	12	10	1	13	EL	93	14

Open

Athlete	Event	Race																Net points	Final rank
Athlete	Event	1	2	3	4	5	6	7	8	9	10	11	12	13	14	15	M*	Net points	Final rank
Akira Ishibashi; Yukio Makino	49er	8	~~17~~	3	13	8	12	8	9	17	6	14	5	CAN	CAN	CAN	EL	103	12

M = Medal race; EL = Eliminated – did not advance into the medal race; CAN = Race cancelled;

== Shooting ==
Men

Athlete	Event	Qualification		Final	
Athlete	Event	Points	Rank	Points	Rank
Susumu Kobayashi	10 m air pistol	577	23	did not advance	
Susumu Kobayashi	50 m pistol	558	10	did not advance	
Tomoyuki Matsuda	10 m air pistol	579	19	did not advance	
Tomoyuki Matsuda	50 m pistol	558	9	did not advance	
Toshikazu Yamashita	10 m air rifle	590	28	did not advance	
Toshikazu Yamashita	50 m rifle prone	593	18	did not advance	
Toshikazu Yamashita	50 m rifle 3 positions	1167	16	did not advance	

Women

Athlete	Event	Qualification		Final	
Athlete	Event	Points	Rank	Points	Rank
Michiko Fukushima	10 m air pistol	373	38	did not advance	
Michiko Fukushima	25 m pistol	581	10	did not advance	
Yukie Nakayama	Trap	67	6 Q	86	4

== Softball ==
Team roster

- Naho Emoto
- Motoko Fujimoto
- Megu Hirose
- Emi Inui
- Sachiko Ito
- Ayumi Karino
- Satoko Mabuchi
- Yukiyo Mine
- Masumi Mishina
- Rei Nishiyama
- Hiroko Sakai
- Rie Sato
- Mika Someya
- Yukiko Ueno
- Eri Yamada

Preliminary round

Team	1	2	3	4	5	6	7	R	H	E
Australia	0	3	0	0	0	0	0	3	6	1
Japan	3	1	0	0	0	0	X	4	5	1
WP: Yukiko Ueno(1-0) LP: Melanie Roche(0-1); Home runs: AUS: Jodie Bowering(1), Natalie Titcume(1); JPN: Satoko Mabuchi(1)

Team	1	2	3	4	5	6	7	R	H	E
Netherlands	0	0	0	0	0	0	0	0	4	1
Japan	2	0	0	0	1	0	X	3	8	0
WP: Hiroko Sakai(2-0) LP: Judith van Kampen(0-1) Sv: Naho Emoto(1)

Team	1	2	3	4	5	6	7	R	H	E
Japan	0	0	3	0	0	0	0	3	2	0
China	0	0	0	0	0	0	0	0	6	2
WP: Yukiko Ueno(2-0) LP: Wei Lu(1-2) Sv: Hiroko Sakai(1); Home runs: JPN: Rie Sato(1); CHN: None

Team	1	2	3	4	5	6	7	R	H	E
Canada	0	0	0	0	0	0	0	0	4	3
Japan	0	2	2	0	0	2	0	6	9	0
WP: Yukiko Ueno(3-0) LP: Lauren Bay(2-2) Sv: Mika Someya(1)

Team	1	2	3	4	5	6	7	R	H	E
Japan	0	0	0	1	1	0	0	2	9	1
Chinese Taipei	0	0	0	0	0	0	1	1	6	1
WP: Hiroko Sakai(1-0) LP: Sheng-Jung Lai(0-1); Home runs: JPN: Satoko Mabuchi(2); TPE: None

Team	1	2	3	4	5	6	7	R	H	E
United States	4	0	0	3	0	X	X	7	9	0
Japan	0	0	0	0	0	X	X	0	1	1
WP: Monica Abbott(1-0) LP: Naho Emoto(0-1); Home runs: USA: Natasha Watley(2), Jessica Mendoza(1,2), Crystl Bustos(3); JPN: None

Team	1	2	3	4	5	6	7	R	H	E
Venezuela	0	0	1	1	0	0	0	2	7	0
Japan	0	0	0	1	4	0	X	5	9	0
WP: Hiroko Sakai(3-0) LP: Mariangee Bogado(2-2); Home runs: VEN: None; JPN: Satoko Mabuchi(3), Eri Yamada (1)

Group table

Team	W	L	RS	RA	WIN%	GB	Tiebreaker
United States	7	0	53	1	1.000	-	-
Japan	6	1	23	13	.857	1	-
Australia	5	2	30	11	.714	2	-
Canada	3	4	17	23	.429	4	-
Chinese Taipei	2	5	10	23	.286	5	2-0 vs. CHN/VEN
China	2	5	19	21	.286	5	1-1 vs. TPE/VEN
Venezuela	2	5	15	35	.286	5	0-2 vs. CHN/TPE
Netherlands	1	6	8	48	.143	6	-

Semifinal

Team	1	2	3	4	5	6	7	8	9	R	H	E
United States	0	0	0	0	0	0	0	0	4	4	6	0
Japan	0	0	0	0	0	0	0	0	1	1	3	0
WP: Monica Abbott(3-0) LP: Yukiko Ueno(3-1) Sv: Cat Osterman; Home runs: USA: Crystl Bustos(5); JPN: None

Bronze medal game

Team	1	2	3	4	5	6	7	8	9	10	11	12	R	H	E
Australia	1	0	0	0	0	0	1	0	0	0	1	0	3	7	2
Japan	0	0	0	2	0	0	0	0	0	0	1	1	4	11	1
WP: Yukiko Ueno(4-1) LP: Tanya Harding(3-2); Home runs: AUS: Kerry Wyborn, JPN: Megu Hirose

The winner of this game advanced to the final while the loser won bronze.

Final

Team	1	2	3	4	5	6	7	R	H	E
Japan	0	0	1	1	0	0	1	3	4	0
United States	0	0	0	1	0	0	0	1	5	2
WP: Yukiko Ueno(5-1) LP: Cat Osterman(3-1); Home runs: JPN: Eri Yamada (2); USA: Crystl Bustos (6)

Final rank:

== Swimming ==
Men

Athlete	Event	Heat		Semifinal		Final	
Athlete	Event	Time	Rank	Time	Rank	Time	Rank
Takuro Fujii	100 m butterfly	51.50	7 Q	51.59	7 Q	51.50	6
Takuro Fujii	200 m individual medley	1:59.19	8 Q	1:59.59	10	did not advance	
Ryosuke Irie	200 m backstroke	1:57.68	7 Q	1:56.35	4 Q	1:55.72	5
Masayuki Kishida	100 m butterfly	52.45	26	did not advance			
Kosuke Kitajima	100 m breaststroke	59.52	2 Q	59.55	2 Q	58.91 WR	1st place, gold medalist(s)
Kosuke Kitajima	200 m breaststroke	2:09.89	6 Q	2:08.61 OR	1 Q	2:07.64 OR	1st place, gold medalist(s)
Takeshi Matsuda	400 m freestyle	3:44.99	10	—N/a		did not advance	
Takeshi Matsuda	1500 m freestyle	15:09.17	18	—N/a		did not advance	
Takeshi Matsuda	200 m butterfly	1:55.06	4 Q	1:54.02	2 Q	1:52.97	3rd place, bronze medalist(s)
Junichi Miyashita	100 m backstroke	54.12	10 Q	53.69	7 Q	53.99	8
Tomomi Morita	100 m backstroke	54.21	12 Q	53.95	10	did not advance	
Takashi Nakano	200 m backstroke	1:59.59	21	did not advance			
Yoshihiro Okumura	200 m freestyle	1:46.89	8 Q	1:46.44	6 Q	1:47.14	7
Hisayoshi Sato	100 m freestyle	49.85	40	did not advance			
Ryuichi Shibata	200 m butterfly	1:55.82	11 Q	1:56.17	13	did not advance	
Yuta Suenaga	100 m breaststroke	1:00.67	13 Q	1:00.67	13	did not advance	
Yuta Suenaga	200 m breaststroke	2:11.30	=17	did not advance			
Ken Takakuwa	200 m individual medley	1:58.51	4 Q	1:58.49	5 Q	1:58.22	5
Sho Uchida	200 m freestyle	1:48.34	24	did not advance			
Takuro Fujii; Masayuki Kishida; Yoshihiro Okumura; Hisayoshi Sato	4 × 100 m freestyle relay	3:17.28	14	—N/a		did not advance	
Hisato Matsumoto; Yasunori Mononobe; Yoshihiro Okumura; Sho Uchida	4 × 200 m freestyle relay	7:09.12	7 Q	—N/a		7:10.31	7
Takuro Fujii; Kosuke Kitajima; Junichi Miyashita; Hisayoshi Sato	4 × 100 m medley relay	3:32.81	3 Q	—N/a		3:31.18	3rd place, bronze medalist(s)

Women

Athlete	Event	Heat		Semifinal		Final	
Athlete	Event	Time	Rank	Time	Rank	Time	Rank
Maiko Fujino	800 m freestyle	8:35.60	21	—N/a		did not advance	
Maiko Fujino	400 m individual medley	4:37.35	11	—N/a		did not advance	
Saori Haruguchi	400 m individual medley	4:45.22	27	—N/a		did not advance	
Natsumi Hoshi	200 m butterfly	2:07.02	6 Q	2:07.93	10	did not advance	
Hanae Ito	100 m backstroke	1:00.16	8 Q	1:00.13	7 Q	1:00.18	8
Hanae Ito	200 m backstroke	2:10.05	14 Q	2:09.86	12	did not advance	
Rie Kaneto	200 m breaststroke	2:24.62	5 Q	2:25.65	8 Q	2:25.14	7
Yuka Kato	100 m butterfly	58.94	23	did not advance			
Asami Kitagawa	100 m breaststroke	1:08.36	15 Q	1:08.23	5 Q	1:08.43	8
Asami Kitagawa	200 m individual medley	2:12.47	=9 Q	2:12.18	=8 WSO	2:11.56	6
Maki Mita	200 m freestyle	1:59.96	21	did not advance			
Reiko Nakamura	100 m backstroke	59.36	2 Q	59.64	3 Q	59.72	6
Reiko Nakamura	200 m backstroke	2:09.77	12 Q	2:08.21	4 Q	2:07.13	3rd place, bronze medalist(s)
Yuko Nakanishi	100 m butterfly	58.61	=18	did not advance			
Yuko Nakanishi	200 m butterfly	2:06.62	3 Q	2:06.96	5 Q	2:07.32	5
Ai Shibata	400 m freestyle	4:17.96	31	—N/a		did not advance	
Ai Shibata	800 m freestyle	8:41.63	27	—N/a		did not advance	
Megumi Taneda	100 m breaststroke	1:08.45	17	did not advance			
Megumi Taneda	200 m breaststroke	2:24.75	6 Q	2:25.42	7 Q	2:25.23	8
Haruka Ueda	200 m freestyle	1:57.64	8 Q	1:58.44	13	did not advance	
Asami Kitagawa; Maki Mita; Haruka Ueda; Misaki Yamaguchi	4 × 100 m freestyle relay	3:39.25	9	—N/a		did not advance	
Maki Mita; Emi Takanabe; Haruka Ueda; Misaki Yamaguchi	4 × 200 m freestyle relay	7:55.63	8 Q	—N/a		7:57.56	7
Hanae Ito*; Yuka Kato; Asami Kitagawa; Reiko Nakamura; Haruka Ueda	4 × 100 m medley relay	3:59.91	6 Q	—N/a		3:59.54	6

* Competed in heats only; WSO - Win swim-off; LSO - Lost swim-off

== Synchronized swimming ==
Athlete	Event	Technical routine		Free routine (preliminary)			Free routine (final)		
Athlete	Event	Points	Rank	Points	Total (technical + free)	Rank	Points	Total (technical + free)	Rank
Saho Harada; Emiko Suzuki	Duet	48.250	3	48.500	96.750	3 Q	48.917	97.167	3rd place, bronze medalist(s)
Ai Aoki; Saho Harada; Yumiko Ishiguro; Naoko Kawashima; Hiromi Kobayashi; Erika Komura; Ayako Matsumura; Emiko Suzuki; Masako Tachibana	Team	48.167	4	—N/a			47.167	95.334	5

== Table tennis ==
Men's singles

Athlete	Event	Preliminary round	Round 1	Round 2	Round 3	Round 4	Quarterfinals	Semifinals	Final / BM	
Athlete	Event	Opposition Result	Opposition Result	Opposition Result	Opposition Result	Opposition Result	Opposition Result	Opposition Result	Opposition Result	Rank
Yo Kan	Singles	Bye			Smirnov (RUS); W 4–1	Wang H (CHN); L 1–4	did not advance			
Seiya Kishikawa	Singles	Bye	Zhang P (CAN); W 4–2	Tan Rw (CRO); L 1–4	did not advance					
Jun Mizutani	Singles	Bye		Éloi (FRA); W 4–3	Kreanga (GRE); L 1–4	did not advance				

Women's singles

Athlete	Event	Preliminary round	Round 1	Round 2	Round 3	Round 4	Quarterfinals	Semifinals	Final / BM	
Athlete	Event	Opposition Result	Opposition Result	Opposition Result	Opposition Result	Opposition Result	Opposition Result	Opposition Result	Opposition Result	Rank
Ai Fukuhara	Singles	Bye			Hu (TUR); W 4–1	Zhang Yn (CHN); L 1–4	did not advance			
Haruna Fukuoka	Singles	Bye		Komwong (THA); W 4–0	Kim K-A (KOR); L 2–4	did not advance				
Sayaka Hirano	Singles	Bye			Gao J (USA); L 1–4	did not advance				

Team

Athlete	Event	Group round		Semifinals	Bronze playoff 1	Bronze playoff 2	Bronze medal	Final	
Athlete	Event	Opposition Result	Rank	Opposition Result	Opposition Result	Opposition Result	Opposition Result	Opposition Result	Rank
Yo Kan; Seiya Kishikawa; Jun Mizutani	Men's team	Group D Hong Kong; W 3 – 0 Nigeria; W 3 – 0 Russia; W 3 – 0	1 Q	Germany; L 2 – 3	Bye	Austria; L 1 – 3	did not advance		
Ai Fukuhara; Haruna Fukuoka; Sayaka Hirano	Women's team	Group D South Korea; L 0 – 3 Spain; W 3 – 2 Australia; W 3 – 0	2	Did not advance	Austria; W 3 – 0	Hong Kong; W 3 – 2	South Korea; L 0 – 3	Did not advance	4

== Taekwondo ==
Athlete	Event	Round of 16	Quarterfinals	Semifinals	Repechage	Bronze Medal	Final	
Athlete	Event	Opposition Result	Opposition Result	Opposition Result	Opposition Result	Opposition Result	Opposition Result	Rank
Yoriko Okamoto	Women's −67 kg	Benabderrassoul (MAR); L 0–2	did not advance					

== Tennis ==
Athlete	Event	Round of 64	Round of 32	Round of 16	Quarterfinals	Semifinals	Final / BM	
Athlete	Event	Opposition Score	Opposition Score	Opposition Score	Opposition Score	Opposition Score	Opposition Score	Rank
Kei Nishikori	Men's singles	Schüttler (GER); L 4–6, 7–6^{(7–5)}, 3–6	did not advance					
Ayumi Morita	Women's singles	Erakovic (NZL); W 5–7, 7–6^{(9–7)}, 6–4	Li N (CHN); L 2–6, 5–7	did not advance				
Ai Sugiyama	Women's singles	Hantuchová (SVK); L 2–6, 5–7	did not advance					
Ayumi Morita; Ai Sugiyama	Women's doubles	—N/a	Arn / Szávay (HUN); W 6–3, 6–3	S Williams / V Williams (USA); L 5–7, 2–6	did not advance			

== Triathlon ==
Athlete	Event	Swim (1.5 km)	Trans 1	Bike (40 km)	Trans 2	Run (10 km)	Total Time	Rank
Hirokatsu Tayama	Men's	18:04	0:30	59:12	0:29	37:58	1:56:13.68	48
Ryosuke Yamamoto	Men's	18:27	0:26	58:53	0:29	33:56	1:52:11.98	30
Juri Ide	Women's	19:50	0:29	1:04:24	0:35	35:05	2:00:23.77	5
Kiyomi Niwata	Women's	19:56	0:34	1:04:14	0:31	35:36	2:00:51.85	9
Ai Ueda	Women's	20:17	0:29	1:03:56	0:28	37:09	2:02:19.09	17

== Volleyball ==
=== Beach ===
Athlete	Event	Preliminary round	Standing	Round of 16	Quarterfinals	Semifinals	Final / BM	
Athlete	Event	Opposition Score	Standing	Opposition Score	Opposition Score	Opposition Score	Opposition Score	Rank
Kentaro Asahi; Katsuhiro Shiratori	Men's	Pool F Brink – Dieckmann (GER); L 0 – 2 (18–21, 18–21); Boersma – Ronnes (NED); W 2 – 1 (21–15, 23–25, 15–11); Gibb – Rosenthal (USA); L 1 – 2 (15–21, 21–19, 16–18)	2 Q	Araújo – Luiz (BRA); L 0 – 2 (21–23, 15–21)	did not advance			
Chiaki Kusuhara; Mika Teru Saiki	Women's	Pool B Walsh – May-Treanor (USA); L 0 – 2 (12–21, 15–21); Håkedal – Torlen (NOR); L 0 – 2 (8–21, 18–21); Grasset – Peraza (CUB); L 0 – 2 (18–21, 17–21)	4	did not advance				

=== Indoor ===
Japan qualified teams in both the men's and women's tournaments. The men's team lost all five matches in the group play, finishing last in their group, and failing to qualify for the final round. The men's final ranking was tied for 11th place. The women's team won two of the matches in the group play, and advanced to the quarterfinals, where they lost to Brazil. The women's final ranking was tied for 5th place.

==== Men's tournament ====
Roster

The following is the Japanese roster in the men's volleyball tournament of the 2008 Summer Olympics.

Head Coach: Tatsuya Ueta

No.	Name	Date of birth	Height	Weight	Spike	Block	2008 club
1	Nobuharu Saito	29 September 1973	2.05 m (6 ft 9 in)	95 kg (209 lb)	345 cm (136 in)	330 cm (130 in)	(Japan) Toray Arrows
5	Daisuke Usami	29 March 1979	1.83 m (6 ft 0 in)	83 kg (183 lb)	330 cm (130 in)	320 cm (130 in)	(Japan) Panasonic Panthers
7	Takahiro Yamamoto	12 July 1978	2.01 m (6 ft 7 in)	90 kg (200 lb)	345 cm (136 in)	331 cm (130 in)	(Japan) Panasonic Panthers
8	Masaji Ogino (c)	8 January 1970	1.97 m (6 ft 6 in)	98 kg (216 lb)	340 cm (130 in)	320 cm (130 in)	(Japan) Suntory Sunbirds
11	Yoshihiko Matsumoto	7 January 1981	1.93 m (6 ft 4 in)	80 kg (180 lb)	358 cm (141 in)	340 cm (130 in)	(Japan) NEC Blue Rockets
12	Kota Yamamura	20 October 1980	2.05 m (6 ft 9 in)	95 kg (209 lb)	350 cm (140 in)	340 cm (130 in)	(Japan) Suntory Sunbirds
13	Kunihiro Shimizu	11 August 1986	1.94 m (6 ft 4 in)	95 kg (209 lb)	345 cm (136 in)	320 cm (130 in)	(Japan) Tokai University
14	Tatsuya Fukuzawa	1 July 1986	1.89 m (6 ft 2 in)	84 kg (185 lb)	355 cm (140 in)	330 cm (130 in)	(Japan) Chuo University
15	Katsutoshi Tsumagari (L)	2 November 1975	1.83 m (6 ft 0 in)	78 kg (172 lb)	320 cm (130 in)	305 cm (120 in)	(Japan) Suntory Sunbirds
16	Yusuke Ishijima	9 January 1984	1.97 m (6 ft 6 in)	100 kg (220 lb)	345 cm (136 in)	335 cm (132 in)	(Japan) Osaka Blazers Sakai
17	Yu Koshikawa	30 June 1984	1.90 m (6 ft 3 in)	87 kg (192 lb)	348 cm (137 in)	335 cm (132 in)	(Japan) Suntory Sunbirds
18	Kosuke Tomonaga	22 July 1980	1.84 m (6 ft 0 in)	83 kg (183 lb)	320 cm (130 in)	310 cm (120 in)	(Japan) Osaka Blazers Sakai

Group play

Pos	Team	Pld	W	L	Pts	SPW	SPL	SPR	SW	SL	SR	Qualification
1	United States	5	5	0	10	460	371	1.240	15	4	3.750	Quarterfinals
2	Italy	5	4	1	9	439	401	1.095	13	6	2.167	Quarterfinals
3	Bulgaria	5	3	2	8	446	440	1.014	10	9	1.111	Quarterfinals
4	China	5	2	3	7	445	492	0.904	9	13	0.692	Quarterfinals
5	Venezuela	5	1	4	6	421	451	0.933	8	12	0.667	
6	Japan	5	0	5	5	392	448	0.875	4	15	0.267	

10 August 2008; 12:10	Italy	3–1	Japan	Beijing Institute of Technology Gymnasium, Beijing; Attendance: 3,000; Referees: Humberto Salas (MEX), Victor Rodriguez (PUR)
10 August 2008; 12:10	(25–19, 25–18, 23–25, 25–17); Results Statistics			Beijing Institute of Technology Gymnasium, Beijing; Attendance: 3,000; Referees: Humberto Salas (MEX), Victor Rodriguez (PUR)

12 August 2008; 22:45	Japan	1–3	Bulgaria	Capital Indoor Stadium, Beijing; Attendance: 3,200; Referees: Mitch Davidson (CAN), Victor Rodriguez (PUR)
12 August 2008; 22:45	(27–29, 25–23, 21–25, 19–25); Results Statistics			Capital Indoor Stadium, Beijing; Attendance: 3,200; Referees: Mitch Davidson (CAN), Victor Rodriguez (PUR)

14 August 2008; 20:00	China	3–2	Japan	Capital Indoor Stadium, Beijing; Attendance: 13,000; Referees: Bela Hobor (HUN), Frank Leuthauser (GER)
14 August 2008; 20:00	(25–20, 25–23, 17–25, 16–25, 15–10) result statistics			Capital Indoor Stadium, Beijing; Attendance: 13,000; Referees: Bela Hobor (HUN), Frank Leuthauser (GER)

16 August 2008; 22:00	Venezuela	3–0	Japan	Capital Indoor Stadium, Beijing; Attendance: 7,500; Referees: Mitch Davidson (CAN), Victor Rodriguez (PUR)
16 August 2008; 22:00	(25–23, 25–21, 25–23) result statistics			Capital Indoor Stadium, Beijing; Attendance: 7,500; Referees: Mitch Davidson (CAN), Victor Rodriguez (PUR)

18 August 2008; 22:35	Japan	0–3	United States	Capital Indoor Stadium, Beijing; Attendance: 5,800; Referees: Dejan Jovanovic (SRB), Patrick Deregnaucourt (FRA)
18 August 2008; 22:35	(18–25, 12–25, 21–25) result statistics			Capital Indoor Stadium, Beijing; Attendance: 5,800; Referees: Dejan Jovanovic (SRB), Patrick Deregnaucourt (FRA)

==== Women's tournament ====
Roster

The following is the Japanese roster in the women's volleyball tournament of the 2008 Summer Olympics.

Head Coach: Shoichi Yanagimoto

№	Name	Date of birth	Height	Weight	Spike	Block	2008 club
1	Megumi Kurihara	31 July 1984	1.88 m (6 ft 2 in)	69 kg (152 lb)	305 cm (120 in)	285 cm (112 in)	(Japan) Pioneer Red Wings
2	Asako Tajimi	26 June 1972	1.80 m (5 ft 11 in)	70 kg (150 lb)	309 cm (122 in)	304 cm (120 in)	(Japan) Pioneer Red Wings
3	Yoshie Takeshita (c)	18 March 1978	1.59 m (5 ft 3 in)	52 kg (115 lb)	280 cm (110 in)	270 cm (110 in)	(Japan) JT Marvelous
4	Kanako Omura	15 December 1976	1.84 m (6 ft 0 in)	70 kg (150 lb)	319 cm (126 in)	310 cm (120 in)	(Japan) Hisamitsu Springs
5	Miyuki Takahashi	25 December 1978	1.70 m (5 ft 7 in)	65 kg (143 lb)	290 cm (110 in)	285 cm (112 in)	(Japan) NEC Red Rockets
6	Yuko Sano (L)	26 July 1979	1.59 m (5 ft 3 in)	54 kg (119 lb)	260 cm (100 in)	250 cm (98 in)	(Japan) Hisamitsu Springs
7	Sachiko Sugiyama	19 October 1979	1.84 m (6 ft 0 in)	66 kg (146 lb)	310 cm (120 in)	305 cm (120 in)	(Japan) NEC Red Rockets
8	Yuka Sakurai	2 September 1974	1.67 m (5 ft 6 in)	63 kg (139 lb)	290 cm (110 in)	275 cm (108 in)	(Japan) Denso Airybees
9	Miyuki Kano	17 May 1977	1.74 m (5 ft 9 in)	65 kg (143 lb)	298 cm (117 in)	275 cm (108 in)	(Japan) Hisamitsu Springs
11	Erika Araki	3 August 1984	1.86 m (6 ft 1 in)	79 kg (174 lb)	307 cm (121 in)	298 cm (117 in)	(Japan) Toray Arrows
12	Saori Kimura	19 August 1986	1.85 m (6 ft 1 in)	66 kg (146 lb)	298 cm (117 in)	293 cm (115 in)	(Japan) Toray Arrows
14	Yuki Kawai	22 January 1990	1.68 m (5 ft 6 in)	63 kg (139 lb)	280 cm (110 in)	275 cm (108 in)	(Japan) JT Marvelous

Group play

Pos	Team	Pld	W	L	Pts	SPW	SPL	SPR	SW	SL	SR	Qualification
1	Cuba	5	5	0	10	426	371	1.148	15	3	5.000	Quarterfinals
2	United States	5	4	1	9	459	441	1.041	12	9	1.333	Quarterfinals
3	China	5	3	2	8	467	395	1.182	13	7	1.857	Quarterfinals
4	Japan	5	2	3	7	381	389	0.979	7	11	0.636	Quarterfinals
5	Poland	5	1	4	6	441	445	0.991	9	12	0.750	
6	Venezuela	5	0	5	5	262	395	0.663	1	15	0.067	

9 August 2008; 22:00	Japan	1–3	United States	Capital Indoor Stadium; Attendance: 11,500; Referees: Massimo Menghini (Italy), Andrei Zenovich (Russia)
9 August 2008; 22:00	(20–25, 25–20, 19–25, 21–25) result statistics			Capital Indoor Stadium; Attendance: 11,500; Referees: Massimo Menghini (Italy), Andrei Zenovich (Russia)

11 August 2008; 22:15	Japan	3–0	Venezuela	Capital Indoor Stadium; Attendance: 5,000; Referees: Karin Zahorcova (Czech Republic), Frans Loderus (Netherlands)
11 August 2008; 22:15	(25–12, 25–17, 25–12) result statistics			Capital Indoor Stadium; Attendance: 5,000; Referees: Karin Zahorcova (Czech Republic), Frans Loderus (Netherlands)

13 August 2008; 22:30	Poland	2–3	Japan	Capital Indoor Stadium; Attendance: 5,400; Referees: Humberto Salas (Mexico), Francisco de Souza (Brazil)
13 August 2008; 22:30	(21–25, 20–25, 25–18, 25–23, 11–15) result statistics			Capital Indoor Stadium; Attendance: 5,400; Referees: Humberto Salas (Mexico), Francisco de Souza (Brazil)

15 August 2008; 22:45	Japan	0–3	Cuba	Capital Indoor Stadium; Attendance: 5,000; Referees: Andrei Zenovich (Russia), Massimo Menghini (Italy)
15 August 2008; 22:45	(17–25, 22–25, 22–25) result statistics			Capital Indoor Stadium; Attendance: 5,000; Referees: Andrei Zenovich (Russia), Massimo Menghini (Italy)

17 August 2008; 20:00	China	3–0	Japan	Capital Indoor Stadium; Attendance: 13,000; Referees: Kim Kun-Tae (South Korea), Janpen Jirakakul (Thailand)
17 August 2008; 20:00	(26–24, 25–16, 25–14) result statistics			Capital Indoor Stadium; Attendance: 13,000; Referees: Kim Kun-Tae (South Korea), Janpen Jirakakul (Thailand)

Quarterfinal

19 August 2008; 12:00	Japan	0–3	Brazil	Capital Indoor Stadium; Attendance: 12,500; Referees: Konstantin Tufekchiev (Bulgaria), Karin Zahorcova (Czech Republic)
19 August 2008; 12:00	(12–25, 20–25, 16–25) result statistics			Capital Indoor Stadium; Attendance: 12,500; Referees: Konstantin Tufekchiev (Bulgaria), Karin Zahorcova (Czech Republic)

== Weightlifting ==
Athlete	Event	Snatch		Clean & Jerk		Total	Rank	
Athlete	Event	Result	Rank	Result	Rank	Total	Rank	
Yasunobu Sekikawa	Men's −56 kg	114	12	142	11	256	11	
Masaharu Yamada	Men's −56 kg	106	17	153	6	259	9	
Yoshito Shintani	Men's −69 kg	135	15	175	8	310	10	
Hiromi Miyake	Women's −48 kg	80	4	105	4	185	4	IOC document moved up from 6th to 4th on November 6, 2018
Misaki Oshiro	Women's −48 kg	80	6	92	6	172	6	IOC document moved up from 8th to 6th on November 6, 2018
Rika Saito	Women's −69 kg	87	7	122	5	209	6	IOC document moved up from 8th to 6th on November 6, 2018

== Wrestling ==
Japan has qualified in the following quota places.

Key:

- VT - Victory by Fall.
- PP - Decision by Points - the loser with technical points.
- PO - Decision by Points - the loser without technical points.

Men's freestyle

Athlete	Event	Qualification	Round of 16	Quarterfinal	Semifinal	Repechage 1	Repechage 2	Final / BM	
Athlete	Event	Opposition Result	Opposition Result	Opposition Result	Opposition Result	Opposition Result	Opposition Result	Opposition Result	Rank
Tomohiro Matsunaga	−55 kg	Diatta (SEN); W 5–0 ^{VT}	Akgul (TUR); W 3–0 ^{PO}	Mansurov (UZB); W 3–1 ^{PP}	Kudukhov (RUS); W 5–0 ^{VT}	Bye		Cejudo (USA); L 0–3 ^{PO}	2nd place, silver medalist(s)
Kenichi Yumoto	−60 kg	Bye	Korjakin (TJK); W 5–0 ^{VT}	Dutt (IND); W 3–1 ^{PP}	Fedoryshyn (UKR); L 1–3 ^{PP}	Bye		Bazarguruev (KGZ); W 3–0 ^{PO}	2nd place, silver medalist(s)
Kazuhiko Ikematsu	−66 kg	Bye	Tushishvili (GEO); L 1–3 ^{PP}	did not advance					13

Men's Greco-Roman

Athlete	Event	Qualification	Round of 16	Quarterfinal	Semifinal	Repechage 1	Repechage 2	Final / BM	
Athlete	Event	Opposition Result	Opposition Result	Opposition Result	Opposition Result	Opposition Result	Opposition Result	Opposition Result	Rank
Makoto Sasamoto	−60 kg	Mnatsakanyan (ARM); W 3–1 ^{PP}	Nazaryan (BUL); L 1–3 ^{PP}	did not advance					10
Shingo Matsumoto	−84 kg	Forov (ARM); L 1–3 ^{PP}	did not advance						15
Kenzo Kato	−96 kg	Timoncini (ITA); L 0–3 ^{PO}	did not advance						19

Women's freestyle

Athlete	Event	Qualification	Round of 16	Quarterfinal	Semifinal	Repechage 1	Repechage 2	Final / BM	
Athlete	Event	Opposition Result	Opposition Result	Opposition Result	Opposition Result	Opposition Result	Opposition Result	Opposition Result	Rank
Chiharu Icho	−48 kg	Bye	Li Xm (CHN); W 3–1 ^{PP}	Merleni (UKR); W 5–0 ^{VT}	Chun (USA); W 3–1 ^{PP}	Bye		Huynh (CAN); L 1–3 ^{PP}	2nd place, silver medalist(s)
Saori Yoshida	−55 kg	—N/a	Nerell (SWE); W 3–1 ^{PP}	Golts (RUS); W 3–0 ^{PO}	Verbeek (CAN); W 3–0 ^{PO}	Bye		Xu L (CHN); W 5–0 ^{VT}	1st place, gold medalist(s)
Kaori Icho	−63 kg	Bye	Zamula (AZE); W 5–0 ^{VT}	Miller (USA); W 5–0 ^{VT}	Dugrenier (CAN); W 3–1 ^{PP}	Bye		Kartashova (RUS); W 3–0 ^{PO}	1st place, gold medalist(s)
Kyoko Hamaguchi	−72 kg	—N/a	Perepelkina (RUS); W 3–1 ^{PP}	Conceição (BRA); W 5–0 ^{VT}	Wang J (CHN); L 0–5 ^{VT}	Bye		Bernard (USA); W 3–1 ^{PP}	3rd place, bronze medalist(s)
