= Megu Hirose =

Japanese softball player

Medal record

Women's softball

Representing Japan

Olympic Games
Gold medal – first place	2008 Beijing	Team competition

Megu Hirose (廣瀬芽) (born April 23, 1981 in Hyōgo Prefecture) is a Japanese softball player who won the gold medal at the 2008 Summer Olympics.
