= Sachiko Ito =

Japanese softball player

Medal record

Women's softball

Representing Japan

Olympic Games
Gold medal – first place	2008 Beijing	Team competition

Sachiko Ito (伊藤 幸子, Itō Sachiko; born 11 October 1975) is a Japanese softball player who won the gold medal at the 2008 Summer Olympics.
