= Naho Emoto =

Japanese softball player (born 1985)

Medal record

Women's softball

Representing Japan

Olympic Games
Gold medal – first place	2008 Beijing	Team competition

Naho Emoto (江本奈穂) (born August 25, 1985 in Kyoto) is a Japanese softball player who won the gold medal at the 2008 Summer Olympics.
