= Mika Someya =

Brazilian-born Japanese softball player

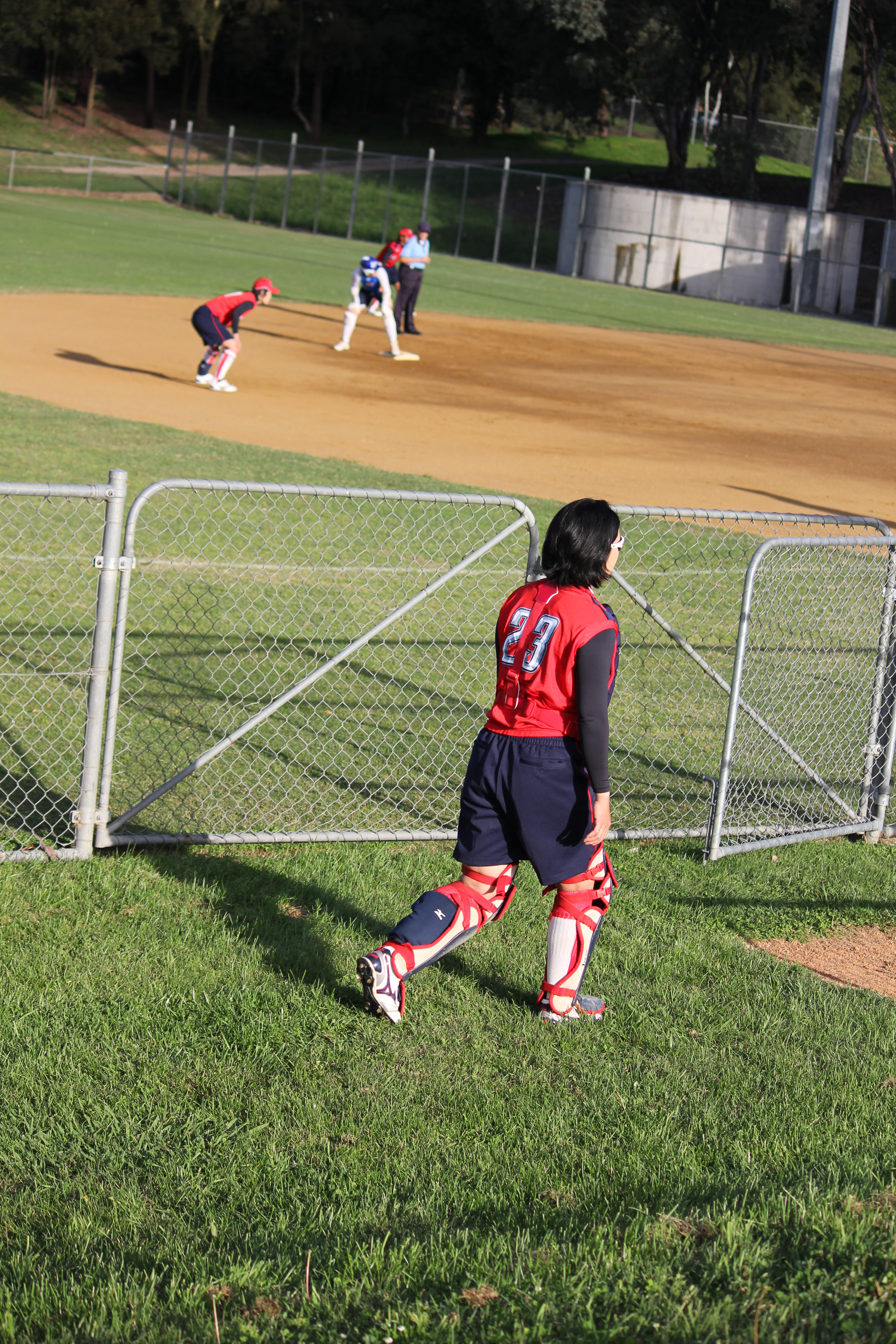
- Someya at a game in Canberra

Personal information
- Born: 2 June 1983 (age 43) Atibaia, Brazil
Medal record
Women's softball
Representing Japan
Olympic Games
| Gold medal – first place | 2008 Beijing | Team competition |

Mika Someya (染谷 美佳, Someya Mika; born 2 June 1983 in Atibaia, Brazil) is a Japanese softball player who won the gold medal at the 2008 Summer Olympics.
