= Motoko Fujimoto =

Japanese softball player (born 1980)

Medal record

Women's softball

Representing Japan

Olympic Games
Gold medal – first place	2008 Beijing	Team competition

Motoko Fujimoto (藤本索子, born December 25, 1980 in Dazaifu, Fukuoka) is a Japanese softball player who won the gold medal at the 2008 Summer Olympics.
