= 2009 Canoe Slalom World Cup =

Canoeing and kayaking championship

The 2009 Canoe Slalom World Cup was a series of five races in 4 canoeing and kayaking categories organized by the International Canoe Federation (ICF). It was the 22nd edition. The series consisted of 2 continental championships (Oceania and Pan American) which were open to all countries and 3 world cup races. The athletes gained points for their results in the three world cup races plus their best result from any of the two continental championships. The women's single canoe appeared for the first time at the world cups and was an exhibition event.

== Calendar ==
Label	Venue	Date
Oceania Championships 2009	(New Zealand) Mangahao	31 January – 1 February
World Cup Race 1	(France) Pau	27–28 June
World Cup Race 2	(Slovakia) Bratislava	4–5 July
World Cup Race 3	(Germany) Augsburg	10–12 July
2009 Pan American Championships	(Canada) Kananaskis	2–3 August

== Final standings ==
The winner of each race was awarded 50 points. Paddlers outside the top 20 in any event were awarded 2 points for participation. If two or more athletes or boats were equal on points, the ranking was determined by their positions in the final world cup race (World Cup Race 3).

=== C1 men ===
Pos	Athlete	Points
1	David Florence (GBR)	160
2	Benjamin Savšek (SLO)	141
3	Jan Benzien (GER)	130
4	Tony Estanguet (FRA)	117
5	Matej Beňuš (SVK)	116
6	Alexander Slafkovský (SVK)	115
7	Sideris Tasiadis (GER)	111
8	Benn Fraker (USA)	100
9	Ander Elosegi (ESP)	100
10	Denis Gargaud Chanut (FRA)	88

=== C2 men ===
Pos	Athletes	Points
1	Ladislav Škantár/Peter Škantár (SVK)	134
2	Pavol Hochschorner/Peter Hochschorner (SVK)	129
3	Marcus Becker/Stefan Henze (GER)	126
4	Tim Baillie/Etienne Stott (GBR)	112
5	Tomáš Kučera/Ján Bátik (SVK)	112
6	Fabien Lefèvre/Denis Gargaud Chanut (FRA)	111
7	Damien Troquenet/Mathieu Voyemant (FRA)	108
8	David Florence/Richard Hounslow (GBR)	107
9	Jaroslav Volf/Ondřej Štěpánek (CZE)	105
10	Christophe Luquet/Pierre Luquet (FRA)	90

=== K1 men ===
Pos	Athlete	Points
1	Peter Kauzer (SLO)	176
2	Daniele Molmenti (ITA)	173
3	Vavřinec Hradilek (CZE)	122
4	Campbell Walsh (GBR)	122
5	Fabien Lefèvre (FRA)	115
6	Alexander Grimm (GER)	111
7	Helmut Oblinger (AUT)	102
8	David Ford (CAN)	99
9	Sebastian Schubert (GER)	98
10	Dejan Kralj (SLO)	97

=== K1 women ===
Pos	Athlete	Points
1	Jana Dukátová (SVK)	182
2	Corinna Kuhnle (AUT)	140
3	Nina Mozetič (SLO)	136
4	Katrina Lawrence (AUS)	110
5	Jasmin Schornberg (GER)	105
6	Gabriela Stacherová (SVK)	100
7	Marie Řihošková (CZE)	99
8	Émilie Fer (FRA)	99
9	Li Jingjing (CHN)	98
10	Louise Donington (GBR)	97

== Results ==
=== Oceania Championships 2009 ===
The 2009 Oceania Championships took place in Mangahao, New Zealand from January 31 to February 1. The C2 event was not held here. Three countries won 1 gold each. New Zealand paddlers managed to take 1 silver and 2 bronze medals.

Event	Gold	Score	Silver	Score	Bronze	Score
C1 men	David Florence (GBR)	97.09	Ian Borrows (AUS)	100.70	Shaun Higgins (NZL)	114.20
C1 women (exhibition event)	Rosalyn Lawrence (AUS)	140.78	Madeline Toms (AUS)	232.81	Lydia Toms (AUS)	
K1 men	Vavřinec Hradilek (CZE)	86.61	Daniele Molmenti (ITA)	89.20	Michael Dawson (NZL)	90.82
K1 women	Jana Dukátová (SVK)	98.22	Luuka Jones (NZL)	100.91	Rosalyn Lawrence (AUS)	103.02

=== World Cup Race 1 ===
The first world cup race of 2009 was held in Pau, France on June 27–28. Home paddlers took 1 gold, 2 silvers and 1 bronze to win the medal table.

Event	Gold	Score	Silver	Score	Bronze	Score
C1 men	Jan Benzien (GER)	102.71	Alexander Slafkovský (SVK)	104.54	David Florence (GBR)	104.90
C1 women (exhibition event)	Cen Nanqin (CHN)	149.56	Rosalyn Lawrence (AUS)	159.92	Leanne Guinea (AUS)	204.91
C2 men	Slovakia; Ladislav Škantár; Peter Škantár	106.86	France; Fabien Lefèvre; Denis Gargaud Chanut	107.86	United Kingdom; David Florence; Richard Hounslow	111.34
K1 men	Peter Kauzer (SLO)	98.87	Boris Neveu (FRA)	101.48	Fabien Lefèvre (FRA)	102.77
K1 women	Mathilde Pichery (FRA)	109.48	Melanie Pfeifer (GER)	110.41	Jana Dukátová (SVK)	113.37

=== World Cup Race 2 ===
The series continued in Bratislava, Slovakia on July 4–5. Slovak paddlers won 3 out of 4 medal events and added 2 silvers and 2 bronzes to win the medal table.

Event	Gold	Score	Silver	Score	Bronze	Score
C1 men	Michal Martikán (SVK)	93.99	Alexander Slafkovský (SVK)	96.93	Matej Beňuš (SVK)	99.10
C1 women (exhibition event)	Jana Dukátová (SVK)	124.10	Leanne Guinea (AUS)	135.05	Dana Beňušová (SVK)	153.29
C2 men	Slovakia; Pavol Hochschorner; Peter Hochschorner	99.73	Slovakia; Ladislav Škantár; Peter Škantár	101.85	Germany; Marcus Becker; Stefan Henze	104.17
K1 men	Campbell Walsh (GBR)	92.67	Daniele Molmenti (ITA)	94.22	Alexander Grimm (GER)	94.33
K1 women	Elena Kaliská (SVK)	103.47	Katrina Lawrence (AUS)	107.21	Jana Dukátová (SVK)	107.37

=== World Cup Race 3 ===
The race in Augsburg, Germany, held on July 10–12, was the final regular world cup race of the season. Germany won the medal table with 1 gold, 2 silvers and 2 bronzes.

Event	Gold	Score	Silver	Score	Bronze	Score
C1 men	Tony Estanguet (FRA)	104.66	Sideris Tasiadis (GER)	106.26	Jan Benzien (GER)	107.17
C1 women (exhibition event)	Rosalyn Lawrence (AUS)	156.49	Marie Řihošková (CZE)	165.48	Cen Nanqin (CHN)	188.70
C2 men	Germany; Marcus Becker; Stefan Henze	112.04	Slovakia; Pavol Hochschorner; Peter Hochschorner	114.35	Czech Republic; Jaroslav Volf; Ondřej Štěpánek	115.38
K1 men	Peter Kauzer (SLO)	99.81	Alexander Grimm (GER)	102.76	Daniele Molmenti (ITA)	103.03
K1 women	Jana Dukátová (SVK)	116.00	Štěpánka Hilgertová (CZE)	120.16	Jennifer Bongardt (GER)	121.77

=== 2009 Pan American Championships ===
The 2009 Pan American Championships were held in Kananaskis, Canada on August 2–3. Canada was the most successful country with 2 golds and 2 bronzes.

Event	Gold	Score	Silver	Score	Bronze	Score
C1 men	James Cartwright (CAN)	107.62	Benjamin Savšek (SLO)	108.98	Zachary Lokken (USA)	115.43
C1 women (exhibition event)	Sindy Audet (CAN)	187.41	Katrina Van Wijk (CAN)	319.19	Jennifer Fritz (USA)	342.70
C2 men	Canada; Ben Hayward; Cameron Smedley	130.23	Brazil; Anderson Weber; Jean f.m. Pereira	190.12	Canada; Thomas Purcell; Daniel Purcell	197.50
K1 men	Daniele Molmenti (ITA)	97.09	Peter Kauzer (SLO)	97.33	David Ford (CAN)	98.47
K1 women	Corinna Kuhnle (AUT)	107.40	Nina Mozetič (SLO)	110.34	Violetta Oblinger-Peters (AUT)	114.94
