= 2008 Canoe Slalom World Cup =

The 2008 Canoe Slalom World Cup was a series of seven races in 4 canoeing and kayaking categories organized by the International Canoe Federation (ICF). It was the 21st edition. The series consisted of 4 continental championships (Africa, Oceania, Pan American and Asia) which were open to all countries and 3 world cup races. The athletes gained points for their results in the three world cup races plus their best result from any of the four continental championships.

== Calendar ==
Label	Venue	Date
2008 African Championships	(Kenya) Sagana	27 January
Oceania Championships 2008	(Australia) Penrith	15–16 March
2008 Pan American Championships	(United States) Charlotte	26 April
2008 Asia Canoe Slalom Championships	(Thailand) Nakhon Nayok	17–18 May
World Cup Race 1	(Czech Republic) Prague	20–22 June
World Cup Race 2	(Slovenia) Tacen	28–29 June
World Cup Race 3	(Germany) Augsburg	4–6 July

== Final standings ==
The winner of each race was awarded 50 points. Paddlers outside the top 20 in the C2 event and outside the top 40 in the other 3 events were awarded 2 points for participation. If two or more athletes or boats were equal on points, the ranking was determined by their positions in the final world cup race.

=== C1 men ===
Pos	Athlete	Points
1	Robin Bell (AUS)	168
2	Alexander Slafkovský (SVK)	132
3	Benn Fraker (USA)	121
4	Dejan Stevanovič (SLO)	114
5	Tomáš Indruch (CZE)	106
6	Teng Zhiqiang (CHN)	106
7	Ronnie Dürrenmatt (SUI)	99
8	Kynan Maley (AUS)	97
9	Christos Tsakmakis (GRE)	95
10	James Cartwright (CAN)	93

=== C2 men ===
Pos	Athletes	Points
1	Pavol Hochschorner/Peter Hochschorner (SVK)	147
2	Ladislav Škantár/Peter Škantár (SVK)	129
3	Marek Jiras/Tomáš Máder (CZE)	127
4	Hu Minghai/Shu Junrong (CHN)	119
5	Mark Bellofiore/Lachie Milne (AUS)	107
6	Tomáš Kučera/Ján Bátik (SVK)	106
7	David Schröder/Frank Henze (GER)	101
8	Marcus Becker/Stefan Henze (GER)	100
9	Duan Junjie/Duan Junqing (CHN)	99
10	Mikhail Kuznetsov/Dmitry Larionov (RUS)	98

=== K1 men ===
Pos	Athlete	Points
1	Erik Pfannmöller (GER)	133
2	Brett Heyl (USA)	117
3	Helmut Oblinger (AUT)	116
4	Lukáš Kubričan (CZE)	112
5	Warwick Draper (AUS)	112
6	William Forsythe (AUS)	101
7	Dejan Kralj (SLO)	98
8	Scott Mann (USA)	95
9	David Ford (CAN)	95
10	Tomáš Mráz (SVK)	94

=== K1 women ===
Pos	Athlete	Points
1	Katrina Lawrence (AUS)	144
2	Mandy Planert (GER)	132
3	Violetta Oblinger-Peters (AUT)	129
4	Li Jingjing (CHN)	123
5	Elena Kaliská (SVK)	118
6	Gabriela Stacherová (SVK)	107
7	Marie Řihošková (CZE)	99
8	Sarah Grant (AUS)	97
9	Nina Mozetič (SLO)	93
10	Jana Dukátová (SVK)	92

== Results ==
=== 2008 African Championships ===
The first African Canoe Slalom Championships were held in Sagana, Kenya on January 27. USA won the medal table with 2 golds and a bronze.

Event	Gold	Score	Silver	Score	Bronze	Score
C1 men	Siboniso Cele (RSA)		Cyprian Ngidi (RSA)		Tyler Hinton (USA)	
C2 men	United States; Mark Staszko; Nic Borst		South Africa; Cameron McIntosh; Cyprian Ngidi		South Africa; Jabulane Mofokeng; Siboniso Cele	
K1 men	Benjamin Boukpeti (TOG)		Johnathan Akinyemi (NGR)		Cameron McIntosh (RSA)	
K1 women	Emily Jackson (USA)		Sarah Dupire (ALG)		Marissa Dederer (CAN)	

=== Oceania Championships 2008 ===
The 2008 Oceania Championships were held in Penrith, Australia on March 15–16. Slovakia won 2 golds a silver and a bronze to top the medal table.

Event	Gold	Score	Silver	Score	Bronze	Score
C1 men	Michal Martikán (SVK)	197.81	Robin Bell (AUS)	202.00	Alexander Slafkovský (SVK)	205.54
C2 men	China; Hu Minghai; Shu Junrong	213.25	Slovakia; Pavol Hochschorner; Peter Hochschorner	214.61	Australia; Mark Bellofiore; Lachie Milne	216.36
K1 men	Jens Ewald (GER)	197.41	Warwick Draper (AUS)	197.47	Brett Heyl (USA)	197.50
K1 women	Elena Kaliská (SVK)	222.42	Li Tong (CHN)	223.02	Li Jingjing (CHN)	224.67

=== 2008 Pan American Championships ===
The 2008 Pan American Championships took place in Charlotte, USA on April 26. The home athletes dominated the medal table by winning 3 golds, 4 silvers and 3 bronzes.

Event	Gold	Score	Silver	Score	Bronze	Score
C1 men	Robin Bell (AUS)	187.70	Benn Fraker (USA)	194.23	Jeff Larimer (USA)	199.13
C2 men	United States; Scott McCleskey; Austin Crane	216.44	United States; Benjamin Kvanli; Mark Poindexter	258.03	United States; Casey Eichfeld; Rick Powell	269.07
K1 men	Brett Heyl (USA)	179.70	Eric Hurd (USA)	181.83	Scott Mann (USA)	182.70
K1 women	Heather Corrie (USA)	223.76	Zuzana Vanha (USA)	232.63	Jessica Groeneveld (CAN)	243.65

=== 2008 Asia Canoe Slalom Championships ===
The 2008 Asia Canoe Slalom Championships were the last of the continental championships to count for the world cup. The event took place in Nakhon Nayok, Thailand on May 17–18. China won the medal table with 2 golds, 2 silvers and 4 bronzes.

Event	Gold	Score	Silver	Score	Bronze	Score
C1 men	Takuya Haneda (JPN)		Feng Liming (CHN)		Zhang Chaojun (CHN)	
C2 men	China; Mai Jianmin; Mo Bin		Japan; Masatoshi Sanma; Hiroyuki Nagao		China; Yu Hongmin; Chen Jin	
K1 men	Kazuki Yazawa (JPN)		Tsubasa Sasaki (JPN)		Huang Cunguang (CHN)	
K1 women	Li Tong (CHN)		Cen Nanqin (CHN)		Zou Yingying (CHN)	

=== World Cup Race 1 ===
The main part of the world cup series got under way in Prague, Czech Republic on June 20–22. France and Czech Republic shared the top spot in the medal table with both countries winning 2 golds and 1 bronze medal.

Event	Gold	Score	Silver	Score	Bronze	Score
C1 men	Tony Estanguet (FRA)	175.50	Robin Bell (AUS)	176.91	David Florence (GBR)	178.39
C2 men	Czech Republic; Marek Jiras; Tomáš Máder		China; Hu Minghai; Shu Junrong		France; Cédric Forgit; Martin Braud	
K1 men	Fabien Lefèvre (FRA)		Erik Pfannmöller (GER)		Lukáš Kubričan (CZE)	
K1 women	Štěpánka Hilgertová (CZE)	192.47	Mandy Planert (GER)	193.84	Jana Dukátová (SVK)	195.43

=== World Cup Race 2 ===
The penultimate race of the series took place in Tacen, Slovenia on June 28–29. Two gold medals were enough for Germany to win the medal table. Slovenia took one gold courtesy of Peter Kauzer.

Event	Gold	Score	Silver	Score	Bronze	Score
C1 men	Nico Bettge (GER)	193.27	Alexander Slafkovský (SVK)	196.65	Ronnie Dürrenmatt (SUI)	198.81
C2 men	Slovakia; Pavol Hochschorner; Peter Hochschorner	200.08	Slovakia; Ladislav Škantár; Peter Škantár	206.25	Czech Republic; Marek Jiras; Tomáš Máder	207.27
K1 men	Peter Kauzer (SLO)	179.29	Lukáš Kubričan (CZE)	184.17	Richard Hounslow (GBR)	184.46
K1 women	Mandy Planert (GER)	205.34	Li Jingjing (CHN)	206.23	Gabriela Stacherová (SVK)	209.67

=== World Cup Race 3 ===
The world cup series closed in Augsburg, Germany on July 4–6. Australia was the most successful country with 2 golds. The German paddlers won 1 gold and 1 bronze medal.

Event	Gold	Score	Silver	Score	Bronze	Score
C1 men	Robin Bell (AUS)	203.67	Tomáš Indruch (CZE)	205.94	Krzysztof Bieryt (POL)	206.47
C2 men	Slovakia; Pavol Hochschorner; Peter Hochschorner	216.77	Slovakia; Ladislav Škantár; Peter Škantár	219.42	Germany; Kay Simon; Robby Simon	221.13
K1 men	Erik Pfannmöller (GER)	193.03	Benoît Peschier (FRA)	195.73	Scott Parsons (USA)	195.79
K1 women	Katrina Lawrence (AUS)	216.01	Jana Dukátová (SVK)	217.06	Marie Řihošková (CZE)	217.70
