= Canoeing at the 2004 Summer Olympics – Men's slalom C-2 =

These are the results of the men's C-2 slalom competition in canoeing at the 2004 Summer Olympics. The C-2 (canoe double) event is raced by two-man canoes through a whitewater course. The venue for the 2004 Olympic competition was the Olympic Canoe/Kayak Slalom Centre at the Helliniko Olympic Complex.

== Medalists ==
| Gold | Silver | Bronze |
| Pavol Hochschorner and Peter Hochschorner (SVK) | Marcus Becker and Stefan Henze (GER) | Jaroslav Volf and Ondřej Štěpánek (CZE) |

| Rank | Name | Country | Preliminary Round | | | | Semifinal | | Final | |
| Rank | Name | Country | Run 1 | Run 2 | Total | Rank | Time | Rank | Time | Total |
|---|---|---|---|---|---|---|---|---|---|---|
| Gold | Pavol Hochschorner & Peter Hochschorner | Slovakia | 100.13 | 100.91 | 201.04 | 1 | 101.29 | 1 | 105.87 | 207.16 |
| Silver | Marcus Becker & Stefan Henze | Germany | 108.35 | 107.21 | 215.56 | 5 | 106.32 | 4 | 104.66 | 210.98 |
| Bronze | Jaroslav Volf & Ondřej Štěpánek | Czech Republic | 108.10 | 106.25 | 214.35 | 3 | 106.22 | 3 | 106.64 | 212.86 |
| 4 | Christian Bahmann & Michael Senft | Germany | 116.01 | 114.58 | 230.59 | 9 | 107.01 | 6 | 106.44 | 213.45 |
| 5 | Philippe Quémerais & Yann Le Pennec | France | 105.29 | 110.04 | 215.33 | 4 | 105.79 | 2 | 111.00 | 216.79 |
| 6 | Andrea Benetti & Erik Masoero | Italy | 116.32 | 121.83 | 238.15 | 10 | 106.40 | 5 | 113.66 | 220.06 |
| 7 | Marek Jiras & Tomáš Máder | Czech Republic | 110.66 | 118.33 | 228.99 | 8 | 110.35 | 7 | | |
| 8 | Matt Taylor & Joe Jacobi | United States | 116.01 | 107.42 | 223.43 | 6 | 111.14 | 8 | | |
| 9 | Stuart Bowman & Nick Smith | Great Britain | 102.25 | 111.16 | 213.41 | 2 | 114.02 | 9 | | |
| 10 | Marcin Pochwała & Paweł Sarna | Poland | 113.86 | 112.79 | 226.65 | 7 | 119.78 | 10 | | |
| 11 | Chen Fubin & Tian Qin | China | 123.64 | 125.02 | 248.66 | 11 | | | | |
| 12 | Mark Bellofiore & Lachie Milne | Australia | 114.07 | 164.29 | 278.36 | 12 | | | | |
