= Katrina Lawrence =

Australian canoeist

Katrina "Kate" Lawrence (born 10 December 1983 in Scone, New South Wales) is an Australian slalom canoeist who competed at the international level from 2000 to 2012.

She won the overall World Cup title in the K1 class in 2008.

She has two sisters who have also competed in canoe slalom. Her older sister Jacqueline is an Olympic silver medalist (2008 Beijing Olympic Games) and her younger sister Rosalyn is two-time overall World Cup champion in C1.

== World Cup individual podiums ==
Season	Date	Venue	Position	Event
2005	30 Jan 2005	Mangahao	1st	K1^{1}
2006	26 Feb 2006	Mangahao	1st	K1^{2}
2008	6 Jul 2008	Augsburg	1st	K1
2009	5 Jul 2009	Bratislava	2nd	K1

^{1} Continental Cup Oceania counting for World Cup points
^{2} Oceania Championship counting for World Cup points
