= 2006 Canoe Slalom World Cup =

The 2006 Canoe Slalom World Cup was a series of eight races in 4 canoeing and kayaking categories organized by the International Canoe Federation (ICF). It was the 19th edition. The series consisted of 4 continental championships (European, Pan American, Oceania and Asian), 3 world cup races and the world championships.

== Calendar ==
Label	Venue	Date
Oceania Championships 2006	(New Zealand) Mangahao	25–26 February
World Cup Race 1	(Greece) Athens	27–28 May
World Cup Race 2	(Germany) Augsburg	2–4 June
World Cup Race 3	(Spain) La Seu d'Urgell	10–11 June
2006 European Canoe Slalom Championships	(France) L'Argentière-la-Bessée	30 June - 2 July
2006 World Championships	(Czech Republic) Prague	3–6 August
2006 Pan American Championships	(Canada) Madawaska	20 August
2006 Asia Canoe Slalom Championships	(China) Zhangjiajie	26–27 August

== Final standings ==
The winner of each world cup race was awarded 30 points. Semifinalists were guaranteed at least 5 points and paddlers eliminated in heats received 2 points each. The continental championships had a lesser status with the winner earning 20 points, semifinalists at least 2 points and all others were awarded 1 point for participation. Because the continental championships were not open to all countries, every athlete could only compete in one of them. The world championships points scale was the same as for the world cups multiplied by a factor of 1.5. That meant the world champion earned 45 points, semifinalists got at least 7.5 points and paddlers eliminated in heats received 3 points apiece. If two or more athletes or boats were equal on points, the ranking was determined by their positions at the world championships.

=== C1 men ===
Pos	Athlete	Points
1	Michal Martikán (SVK)	130.5
2	Tony Estanguet (FRA)	92
3	Nico Bettge (GER)	82.5
4	Jan Benzien (GER)	79
5	Juraj Minčík (SVK)	71
6	Tomáš Indruch (CZE)	69.5
7	David Florence (GBR)	69
8	Stanislav Ježek (CZE)	67
9	Robin Bell (AUS)	61
10	Alexander Slafkovský (SVK)	59.5

=== C2 men ===
Pos	Athletes	Points
1	Pavol Hochschorner/Peter Hochschorner (SVK)	107
2	Marek Jiras/Tomáš Máder (CZE)	99.5
3	Jaroslav Volf/Ondřej Štěpánek (CZE)	83
4	Cédric Forgit/Martin Braud (FRA)	78
5	Andrea Benetti/Erik Masoero (ITA)	72.5
6	Marcus Becker/Stefan Henze (GER)	67.5
7	Felix Michel/Sebastian Piersig (GER)	63.5
8	Hu Minghai/Shu Junrong (CHN)	60
9	Christophe Luquet/Pierre Luquet (FRA)	58.5
10	Milan Kubáň/Marián Olejník (SVK)	57

=== K1 men ===
Pos	Athlete	Points
1	Erik Pfannmöller (GER)	95
2	Julien Billaut (FRA)	91
3	Alexander Grimm (GER)	82
4	Peter Kauzer (SLO)	80
5	Fabien Lefèvre (FRA)	63.5
6	Daniele Molmenti (ITA)	59.5
7	Helmut Oblinger (AUT)	59
8	Michael Kurt (SUI)	56.5
9	Scott Parsons (USA)	56.5
10	Eoin Rheinisch (IRL)	55.5

=== K1 women ===
Pos	Athlete	Points
1	Elena Kaliská (SVK)	115
2	Jennifer Bongardt (GER)	112
3	Štěpánka Hilgertová (CZE)	105.5
4	Jana Dukátová (SVK)	103
5	Mathilde Pichery (FRA)	67
6	Violetta Oblinger-Peters (AUT)	62
7	Marie Řihošková (CZE)	61
8	Irena Pavelková (CZE)	61
9	Fiona Pennie (GBR)	59.5
10	Li Jingjing (CHN)	58.5

== Results ==
=== Oceania Championships 2006 ===
The Oceania Championships took place in Mangahao, New Zealand from 25 to 26 February.

Event	Gold	Score	Silver	Score	Bronze	Score
C1 men	Matthew Gabb (AUS)	198.04	James Dawson (NZL)	222.11	Mark Yungnickel (NZL)	224.51
C2 men	Australia; Mark Bellofiore; Lachie Milne	225.52	New Zealand; Bryden Nicholas; Andrew Robinson	286.86	-	
K1 men	Warwick Draper (AUS)	183.85	Jared Meehan (NZL)	189.80	Sam Lyons (AUS)	191.08
K1 women	Katrina Lawrence (AUS)	219.05	Jacqueline Lawrence (AUS)	224.26	Victoria Milne (AUS)	227.39

=== World Cup Race 1 ===
World Cup Race 1 took place at the Hellinikon Olympic Canoe/Kayak Slalom Centre in Athens, Greece from 27 to 28 May.

Event	Gold	Score	Silver	Score	Bronze	Score
C1 men	Michal Martikán (SVK)	184.34	Robin Bell (AUS)	185.28	Jan Benzien (GER)	187.79
C2 men	Slovakia; Pavol Hochschorner; Peter Hochschorner	202.06	France; Christophe Luquet; Pierre Luquet	205.09	Czech Republic; Marek Jiras; Tomáš Máder	206.37
K1 men	Daniele Molmenti (ITA)	184.51	Erik Pfannmöller (GER)	185.50	Alexander Grimm (GER)	186.12
K1 women	Štěpánka Hilgertová (CZE)	207.57	Gabriela Stacherová (SVK)	207.69	Irena Pavelková (CZE)	208.55

=== World Cup Race 2 ===
World Cup Race 2 took place at the Augsburg Eiskanal, Germany from 2 to 4 June.

Event	Gold	Score	Silver	Score	Bronze	Score
C1 men	David Florence (GBR)	203.29	Juraj Minčík (SVK); Michal Martikán (SVK)	206.38; 206.38	-	
C2 men	Germany; Marcus Becker; Stefan Henze	218.54	Czech Republic; Jaroslav Volf; Ondřej Štěpánek	219.94	United Kingdom; Stuart Bowman; Nick Smith	222.05
K1 men	Erik Pfannmöller (GER)	193.43	Helmut Oblinger (AUT)	194.86	Fabien Lefèvre (FRA)	194.88
K1 women	Elena Kaliská (SVK)	215.56	Štěpánka Hilgertová (CZE)	219.32	Violetta Oblinger-Peters (AUT)	219.50

=== World Cup Race 3 ===
World Cup Race 3 took place at the Segre Olympic Park in La Seu d'Urgell, Spain from 10 to 11 June.

Event	Gold	Score	Silver	Score	Bronze	Score
C1 men	Nico Bettge (GER)	201.25	Juraj Minčík (SVK)	201.51	Michal Martikán (SVK)	202.37
C2 men	Czech Republic; Marek Jiras; Tomáš Máder	209.50	Italy; Andrea Benetti; Erik Masoero	210.48	Germany; Kay Simon; Robby Simon	210.60
K1 men	Peter Kauzer (SLO)	189.56	Alexander Grimm (GER)	189.73	Dejan Kralj (SLO)	190.35
K1 women	Jennifer Bongardt (GER)	209.76	Jana Dukátová (SVK)	210.10	Elena Kaliská (SVK)	210.48

=== 2006 European Championships ===
The European Championships took place in L'Argentière-la-Bessée, France from 30 June to 2 July.

Event	Gold	Score	Silver	Score	Bronze	Score
C1 men	Tony Estanguet (FRA)	221.24	Michal Martikán (SVK)	224.82	Tomáš Indruch (CZE)	225.96
C2 men	France; Martin Braud; Cédric Forgit	237.51	Slovakia; Pavol Hochschorner; Peter Hochschorner	237.91	Germany; Kay Simon; Robby Simon	238.73
K1 men	Fabian Dörfler (GER)	211.61	Erik Pfannmöller (GER)	212.09	Diego Paolini (ITA)	212.73
K1 women	Elena Kaliská (SVK)	237.11	Jennifer Bongardt (GER)	238.34	Mathilde Pichery (FRA)	238.86

=== 2006 World Championships ===
The World Championships took place at the Prague-Troja Canoeing Centre, Czech Republic from 3 to 6 August.

Event	Gold	Score	Silver	Score	Bronze	Score
C1 men	Tony Estanguet (FRA)	207.69	Michal Martikán (SVK)	209.00	Stanislav Ježek (CZE)	211.01
C2 men	Czech Republic; Jaroslav Volf; Ondřej Štěpánek	224.67	Germany; Marcus Becker; Stefan Henze	226.86	Slovakia; Pavol Hochschorner; Peter Hochschorner	229.84
K1 men	Stefano Cipressi (ITA); Julien Billaut (FRA)	202.02; 204.49	-		Campbell Walsh (GBR)	204.78
K1 women	Jana Dukátová (SVK)	224.09	Fiona Pennie (GBR)	227.41	Jennifer Bongardt (GER)	229.29

=== 2006 Pan American Championships ===
The Pan American Championships took place in Madawaska, Ontario on 20 August.

Event	Gold	Score	Silver	Score	Bronze	Score
C1 men	James Cartwright (CAN)	212.72	Casey Eichfeld (USA)	214.45	Erik Amason (USA)	217.40
C2 men	Canada; Mike Holroyd; Tom Hewitt	244.16	Canada; Jamie Cutts; Adam Cutts	245.03	United States; Trevor Soileau; Chris Soileau	254.67
K1 men	David Ford (CAN)	186.95	Scott Parsons (USA)	187.06	Brett Heyl (USA)	189.91
K1 women	Saskia Van Mourik (CAN)	225.68	Zuzana Vanha (USA)	226.58	Sarah Boudens (CAN)	227.96

=== 2006 Asia Canoe Slalom Championships ===
The Asia Canoe Slalom Championships took place in Zhangjiajie, China from 26 to 27 August.

Event	Gold	Score	Silver	Score	Bronze	Score
C1 men	Takuya Haneda (JPN)		Feng Liming (CHN)		Chen Fangjia (CHN)	
C2 men	China; Hu Minghai; Shu Junrong		China; Gong Jian; Tian Qin		China; Chen Ze; Min Xiaowei	
K1 men	Ding Fuxue (CHN)		Hermann Husslein (THA)		Xian Jinbin (CHN)	
K1 women	Li Tong (CHN)		Li Jingjing (CHN)		Cen Nanqin (CHN)	
