= Pfannmöller =

Pfannmöller is a German surname. 'Pfanne' means 'frying pan' and 'Möller' a mixture of ore and carbon. Notable people with the surname include:

- Erik Pfannmöller (born 1985), German slalom canoeist
- Stefan Pfannmöller (born 1980), German slalom canoeist
