= Warwick Draper =

Australian slalom canoeist

Warwick Draper (born 23 September 1976 in Melbourne) is an Australian slalom canoeist who has competed since the mid-1990s. Competing in three Summer Olympics, he earned his best finish of fifth in the K1 event in Beijing in 2008.

Draper's love of canoeing began whilst at Eltham college during a school camp when he paddled in a lake.

In 2017, he was a contestant on the inaugural season of Australian Ninja Warrior.

== World Cup individual podiums ==
Season	Date	Venue	Position	Event
2005	30 Jan 2005	Mangahao	3rd	K1^{1}
2006	26 Feb 2006	Mangahao	1st	K1^{2}
2008	16 Mar 2008	Penrith	2nd	K1^{2}

^{1} Continental Cup Oceania counting for World Cup points
^{2} Oceania Championship counting for World Cup points
