= Jürgen Henze =

East German canoeist

Medal record

Men's canoe slalom

Representing East Germany

World Championships
Gold medal – first place	1975 Skopje	C2 team

Jürgen Henze (born 23 June 1950 in Schkopau) is a former East German slalom canoeist who competed in the 1970s.

He won a gold medal in the C2 team event at the 1975 in Skopje. Henze also finished 18th in the C2 event at the 1972 Summer Olympics in Munich.

His partner in the boat was Herbert Fischer.

His two sons Frank and Stefan were also slalom canoeists. Both represented reunified Germany in the Olympics unlike their father who only competed for the now dissolved East Germany. Stefan was a silver medalist from the C2 event at the 2004 Summer Olympics in Athens.
