= Canoeing at the 2008 Summer Olympics – Men's slalom C-1 =

The men's C-1 slalom competition in canoeing at the 2008 Summer Olympics took place between August 11 and 12 2008 at the Shunyi Olympic Rowing-Canoeing Park in Beijing. The C-1 (solo canoe) event was raced by one-man canoes through a whitewater course.

There were three rounds of competitions: the heats, the semifinal, and the final. In the heats, each canoeist completed two runs of the course. The time, in seconds, of each run was added to the number of penalty points assessed. Touching any of the 21 slalom gates resulted in a 2-second penalty for each gate touched, while skipping any of the gates resulted in a 50-second penalty. The total times for the two preliminary runs were summed to give a score for the heats. The top 12 boats advanced to the semifinals.

The semifinals consisted of a single run. The field was narrowed to the top 8 scores from that run; those 8 boats advanced to the final. The times from the final were added to the semifinal score to give an overall total.

== Schedule ==
All times are China Standard Time (UTC+8)

Date	Time	Round
Monday, August 11, 2008	15:00-15:50	Heats 1st Run
Monday, August 11, 2008	16:52-17:40	Heats 2nd Run
Tuesday, August 12, 2008	15:00-15:40	Semifinal
Tuesday, August 12, 2008	16:47-17:15	Final

== Medalists ==
Gold	Silver	Bronze
Michal Martikán (SVK)	David Florence (GBR)	Robin Bell (AUS)

== Results ==
Rank	Name	Country	Preliminary Round				Semifinal		Final	
Rank	Name	Country	Run 1	Run 2	Total	Rank	Time	Rank	Time	Total
1st place, gold medalist(s)	Michal Martikán	Slovakia	85.13	85.02	170.15	1	88.92	1	87.73	176.65
2nd place, silver medalist(s)	David Florence	Great Britain	89.47	82.16	171.63	3	90.46	4	88.15	178.61
3rd place, bronze medalist(s)	Robin Bell	Australia	88.86	87.59	176.45	7	91.16	5	89.43	180.59
4	Ander Elosegi	Spain	87.00	85.47	172.47	5	92.19	7	89.93	182.12
5	Stanislav Ježek	Czech Republic	85.69	86.40	172.09	4	89.85	2	92.44	182.29
6	Benn Fraker	United States	91.97	87.47	179.44	10	92.27	8	90.87	183.14
7	Christos Tsakmakis	Greece	91.53	86.01	177.54	8	92.18	6	94.49	186.67
8	Krzysztof Bieryt	Poland	95.39	87.90	183.29	12	90.08	3	110.13	200.21
9	Tony Estanguet	France	89.99	86.09	176.08	6	93.92	9		
10	Alexander Lipatov	Russia	87.65	90.51	178.16	9	94.16	10		
11	Feng Liming	China	91.44	90.55	181.99	11	94.64	11		
12	Jan Benzien	Germany	85.92	84.58	170.50	2	95.15	12		
13	James Cartwright	Canada	93.83	90.80	184.63	13				
14	Takuya Haneda	Japan	94.08	92.24	186.32	14				
15	Emir Mujčinović	Croatia	95.41	93.90	189.31	15				
16	Siboniso Cele	South Africa	162.51	100.42	262.93	16				
