= Whitewater Center =

Whitewater Center may refer to:

- U.S. National Whitewater Center, Charlotte, North Carolina
- Ocoee Whitewater Center, near Ducktown, Tennessee, the canoe slalom venue for the 1996 Summer Olympics in Atlanta
