= Benjamin Kvanli =

Guatemalan-American slalom canoeist (born 1975)

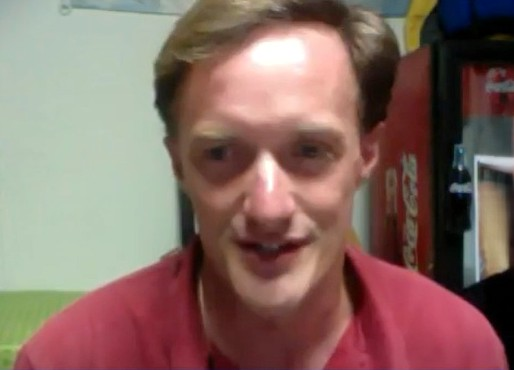
Kvanli in 2013

Benjamin "Ben" Kvanli (born 5 February 1975) is a Guatemalan-American slalom canoeist who competed in the 1990s and 2000s (decade). He finished 33rd in the K1 event at the 1996 Summer Olympics in Atlanta while representing Guatemala.

== World Cup individual podiums ==
Season	Date	Venue	Position	Event
2005	27 Aug 2005	Kern River	2nd	C2^{1}
2008	26 Apr 2008	Charlotte	2nd	C2^{1}

^{1} Pan American Championship counting for World Cup points
