= Cyprian Ngidi =

South African canoeist (born 1983)

Medal record

Men's canoe slalom

Representing South Africa

All-Africa Games
Silver medal – second place	2011 Maputo	C1

Lindelani Cyprian Ngidi (born 30 June 1983 in Pietermaritzburg) is a South African slalom canoeist who competed at the international level from 2003 to 2013. He was eliminated in the qualifying round of the C2 event at the 2008 Summer Olympics in Beijing, finishing in 12th place.

Ngidi competed in C1 and C2 classes. His partner in the C2 boat between 2006 and 2008 was Cameron McIntosh. In 2010 he paddled with Siboniso Cele.

== World Cup individual podiums ==
Season	Date	Venue	Position	Event
2008	27 Jan 2008	Sagana	2nd	C1^{1}
2008	27 Jan 2008	Sagana	2nd	C2^{1}

^{1} African Championship counting for World Cup points
