= Rick Powell =

American canoeist (born 1989)

Richard Powell (born March 22, 1989, in West Chester, Pennsylvania) is an American slalom canoeist who has competed since the mid-2000s. He was eliminated in the qualifying round of the C2 event at the 2008 Summer Olympics in Beijing, finishing in 11th place.

Powell has spent most of his career specializing in the K1 class, but he did compete in the C2 class partnering Casey Eichfeld from 2006 to 2008.

== World Cup individual podiums ==
Season	Date	Venue	Position	Event
2008	26 Apr 2008	Charlotte	3rd	C2^{1}

^{1} Pan American Championship counting for World Cup points
