= Robin Bell (canoeist) =

Australian canoeist

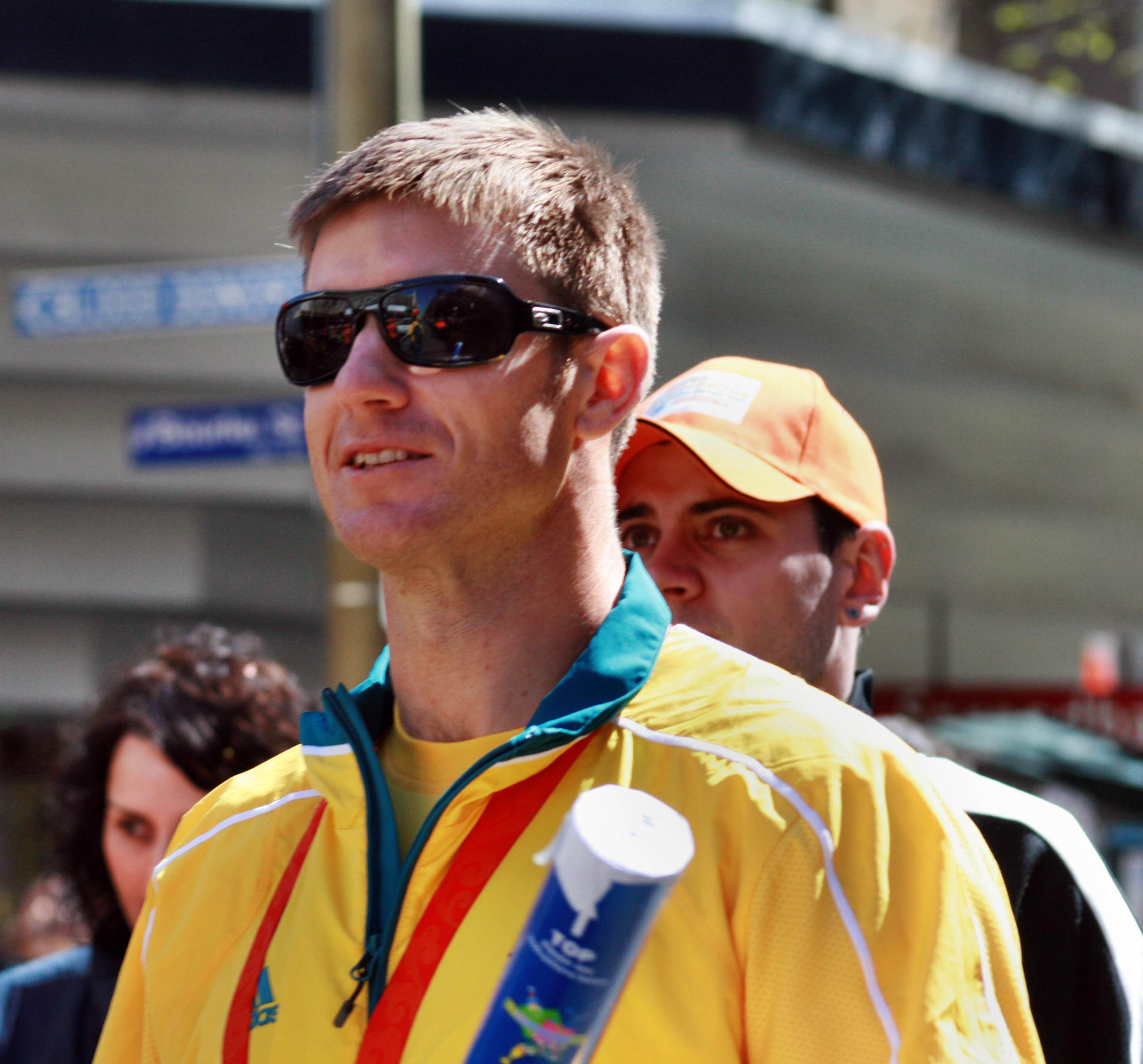
- Bell in 2008

Personal information
- Born: 16 November 1977 (age 48) Cape Town, South Africa

Sport
- Country: Australia
- Sport: Canoe slalom
- Event: C1
Medal record
Men's canoe slalom
Representing Australia
Olympic Games
Bronze medal – third place	2008 Beijing	C1
World Championships
Gold medal – first place	2005 Penrith	C1
Silver medal – second place	1999 La Seu d'Urgell	C1
Bronze medal – third place	2007 Foz do Iguaçu	C1

Robin Bell (born 16 November 1977 in Cape Town) is a South African-born, Australian slalom canoeist who competed from the late 1990s to the late 2000s. Competing in three Summer Olympics, he won a bronze medal in the C1 event in Beijing in 2008.

Bell also won a complete set of medals in the C1 event at the ICF Canoe Slalom World Championships with a gold in 2005, a silver in 1999 and a bronze in 2007.

He won the overall World Cup title in C1 in 2005 and 2008.

He was named Western Australian Sports Star of the Year in 2005, and became world number one in 2006.

== World Cup individual podiums ==
	1st place, gold medalist(s)	2nd place, silver medalist(s)	3rd place, bronze medalist(s)	Total
C1	3	9	1	13

Season	Date	Venue	Position	Event
2001	29 July 2001	Augsburg	2nd	C1
2001	5 August 2001	Prague	2nd	C1
2003	11 May 2003	Penrith	2nd	C1
2003	13 July 2003	Tacen	3rd	C1
2005	9 July 2005	Athens	2nd	C1
2005	24 July 2005	La Seu d'Urgell	2nd	C1
2005	1 October 2005	Penrith	1st	C1^{1}
2006	28 May 2006	Athens	2nd	C1
2007	15 July 2007	Augsburg	2nd	C1
2008	16 March 2008	Penrith	2nd	C1^{2}
2008	26 April 2008	Charlotte	1st	C1^{3}
2008	21 June 2008	Prague	2nd	C1
2008	6 July 2008	Augsburg	1st	C1

^{1} World Championship counting for World Cup points
^{2} Oceania Championship counting for World Cup points
^{3} Pan American Championship counting for World Cup points
