= Brett Heyl =

American canoeist

Brett Heyl (born 29 October 1981 in Hanover, New Hampshire) is an American slalom canoeist who competed at the international level from 1998 to 2012. He finished 15th in the K1 event at the 2004 Summer Olympics in Athens.

Heyl is the nephew of singer James Taylor.

== World Cup individual podiums ==
| Season | Date | Venue | Position | Event |
|---|---|---|---|---|
| 2005 | 27 Aug 2005 | Kern River | 2nd | K1^{1} |
| 2006 | 20 Aug 2006 | Madawaska | 3rd | K1^{1} |
| 2008 | 16 Mar 2008 | Penrith | 3rd | K1^{2} |
| 2008 | 26 Apr 2008 | Charlotte | 1st | K1^{1} |

^{1} Pan American Championship counting for World Cup points
^{2} Oceania Championship counting for World Cup points
