= David Florence =

British slalom canoeist

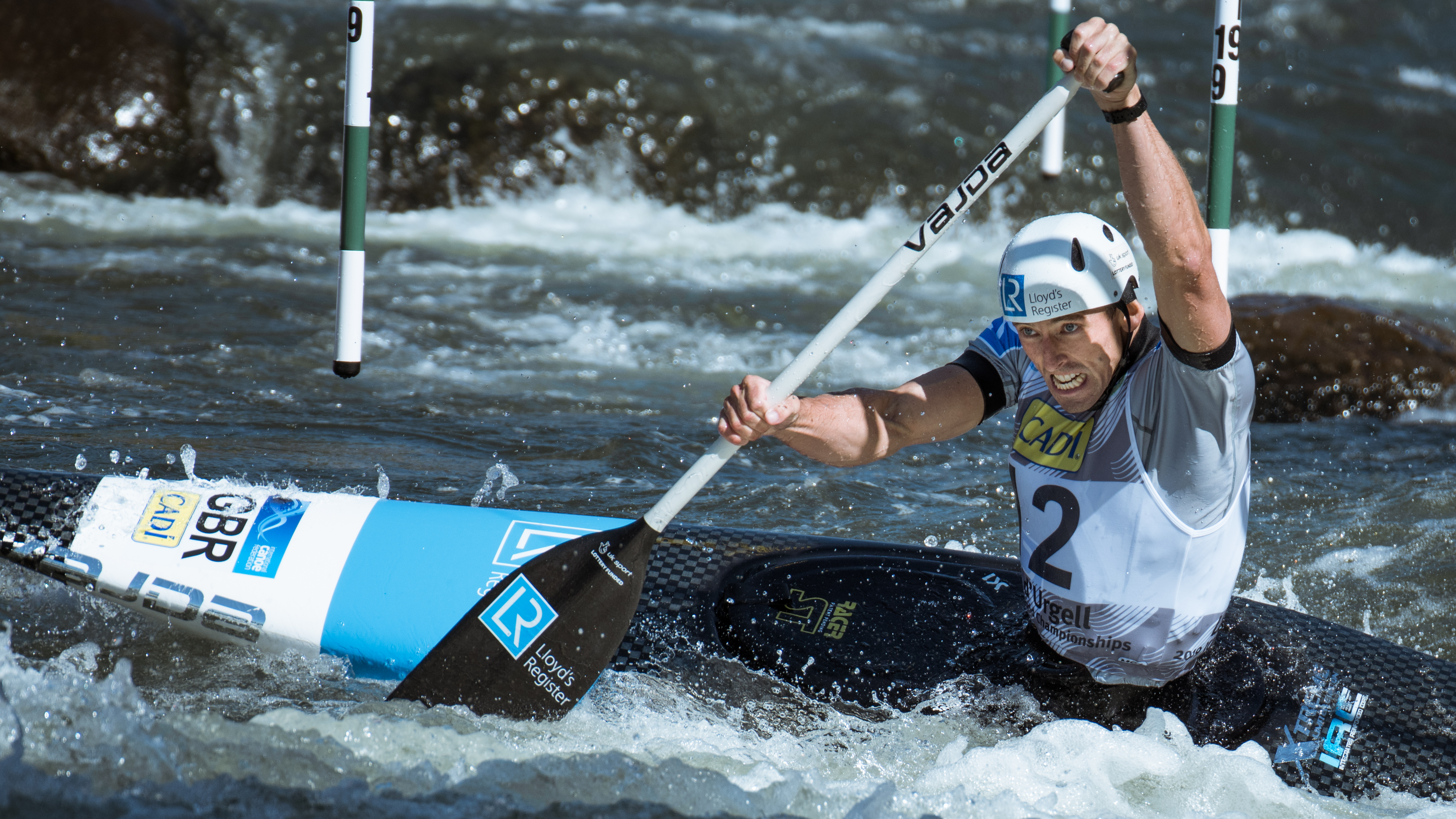
- Florence at the 2019 Canoe slalom World Championships

Personal information
- Nationality: Scottish
- Born: 8 August 1982 (age 44) Aberdeen, Scotland
- Height: 1.88 m (6 ft 2 in)
- Weight: 78 kg (172 lb)

Sport
- Country: Great Britain
- Sport: Canoe slalom
- Event: C1, C2
- Club: Forth
Medal record
Event	1st	2nd	3rd
Olympic Games	0	3	0
World Championships	3	1	7
European Championships	1	1	5
U23 European Championships	0	0	1
Total	4	5	13
Olympic Games
Silver medal – second place	2008 Beijing	C1
Silver medal – second place	2012 London	C2
Silver medal – second place	2016 Rio de Janeiro	C2
World Championships
Gold medal – first place	2013 Prague	C1
Gold medal – first place	2013 Prague	C2
Gold medal – first place	2015 London	C1
Silver medal – second place	2017 Pau	C1 team
Bronze medal – third place	2006 Prague	C1 team
Bronze medal – third place	2009 La Seu d'Urgell	C2 team
Bronze medal – third place	2010 Tacen	C2
Bronze medal – third place	2011 Bratislava	C2 team
Bronze medal – third place	2013 Prague	C2 team
Bronze medal – third place	2015 London	C2 team
Bronze medal – third place	2018 Rio de Janeiro	C1 team
European Championships
Gold medal – first place	2012 Augsburg	C2 team
Silver medal – second place	2009 Nottingham	C2 team
Bronze medal – third place	2010 Bratislava	C2
Bronze medal – third place	2010 Bratislava	C2 team
Bronze medal – third place	2015 Markkleeberg	C2
Bronze medal – third place	2015 Markkleeberg	C1 team
Bronze medal – third place	2016 Liptovský Mikuláš	C1 team
U23 European Championships
Bronze medal – third place	2005 Kraków	C1 team

David Florence (born 8 August 1982) is a retired British slalom canoeist who competed at the international level from 1999 to 2021. He is the 2013 and 2015 world champion in individual single canoe (C1) and 2013 champion in double canoe (C2), the latter with Richard Hounslow. Florence was the first canoeist since Charles Dussuet, sixty years earlier, to achieve the C1, C2 double at the same World Championships.

Florence won silver medals at three consecutive Olympics: in the C1 in 2008 and in the C2 in 2012 and 2016 (with Richard Hounslow).

He announced his retirement from the sport in May 2022.

== Early life ==
Having been born in Aberdeen, Florence lived in Edinburgh between the ages of 7 and 18 on the same street as future world and Olympic cycling champion Chris Hoy. He attended Roseburn Primary School and Stewarts Melville College secondary school. He began canoeing at the age of 14, on the Water of Leith, and was eventually invited to join the Forth Canoe Club, where most of his training was done on the Union Canal. He went to the University of Nottingham and studied mathematical physics, but says his main reason for choosing to move to Nottingham was because it is the home of the National Watersports Centre. His father, George, is a former Scottish canoeing champion and his brother, Fraser also canoes for Scotland. His Uncle Angus Florence also canoed for Scotland.

== Career ==
Florence finished 4th in the 2005 European Championships and 15th in the World Championships the same year. He also won a bronze medal in the World Cup event in Seu. In 2006 he improved to a sixth-place finish in the World Championships, won a bronze in the C1 team, and took the gold medal at the World Cup in Augsburg. In 2007 he took 5th place at the World Championships and two World Cup medals, bronzes in Prague and Augsburg. In 2009 he started competing in C2 alongside Richard Hounslow and he won a bronze in the C2 team event at the 2009 World Championships in La Seu d'Urgell. He went on to win a bronze in the C2 event at the 2010 World Championships in Tacen and another one in the C2 team event at the 2011 World Championships in Bratislava. At the 2013 World Championships in Prague he won 2 golds (C1 and C2) and 1 bronze (C2 team). He won a silver medal in the C1 team event at the 2017 world championships in Pau.

He won a total of eleven medals at the World Championships with three golds, one silver and seven bronzes. In 2009 he won the overall World Cup title in C1. Florence also has seven medals from the European Championships (1 gold, 1 silver and 5 bronzes). He finished three consecutive years as the C1 World No. 1, from 2012 to 2014.

=== 2008 Olympics ===
At the 2008 Summer Olympics, in Beijing, Florence competed in the C1 event. He finished second overall, winning the silver medal behind Slovak world number one Michal Martikán. He completed his preliminary runs of the course at the Shunyi Olympic Rowing-Canoeing Park in 89.47 and 82.16 seconds, to lie 3rd overall, with a total time of 171.63 seconds, heading into the semifinal. His semifinal time of 90.46 seconds, qualifying him for the final in 4th place out of the ten advancing competitors. His final run of 88.15 seconds gave him a total time 178.61 seconds and meant he led with only Martikán left to compete, however the Slovak went almost 2 seconds faster to push Florence into the silver medal position. After the event Florence said he had been inspired by the sight of Rebecca Adlington winning her 400 metres freestyle gold medal the day before.

=== 2012 Olympics ===
Florence qualified for the C1 event at the 2012 Summer Olympics in London at the British trials. Thanks to the fact that his C2 partner Richard Hounslow qualified for the K1 event, they were able to start together in the C2 event as the second British boat in that category. Florence was a favourite to medal especially in the C1 event, but he failed to make the final after a semifinal run full of mistakes. He finished down in 10th place which was a disappointment for him as well as the local fans. He and Hounslow (who also had a disappointing run in K1) made amends in the C2 event where they were able to win the silver medal behind their compatriots Tim Baillie and Etienne Stott and ahead of the three-time defending champions Pavol and Peter Hochschorner.

== World Cup individual podiums ==
	1st place, gold medalist(s)	2nd place, silver medalist(s)	3rd place, bronze medalist(s)	Total
C1	6	7	8	21
C2	1	1	4	6
Total	7	8	12	27

Season	Date	Venue	Position	Event
2005	24 July 2005	La Seu d'Urgell	3rd	C1
2006	4 June 2006	Augsburg	1st	C1
2007	18 March 2007	Foz do Iguaçu	3rd	C1^{1}
2007	30 June 2007	Prague	3rd	C1
2007	15 July 2007	Augsburg	3rd	C1
2008	21 June 2008	Prague	3rd	C1
2009	1 February 2009	Mangahao	1st	C1^{2}
2009	28 June 2009	Pau	3rd	C1
2009	28 June 2009	Pau	3rd	C2
2011	25 June 2011	Tacen	1st	C1
2011	13 August 2011	Prague	3rd	C1
2011	14 August 2011	Prague	3rd	C2
2012	9 June 2012	Cardiff	1st	C1
2012	10 June 2012	Cardiff	1st	C2
2012	23 June 2012	La Seu d'Urgell	2nd	C1
2013	23 June 2013	Cardiff	2nd	C2
2013	24 August 2013	Bratislava	2nd	C1
2014	7 June 2014	Lee Valley	1st	C1
2014	21 June 2014	Prague	2nd	C1
2014	16 August 2014	Augsburg	2nd	C1
2014	17 August 2014	Augsburg	3rd	C2
2015	20 June 2015	Prague	3rd	C1
2015	27 June 2015	Kraków	2nd	C1
2015	9 August 2015	La Seu d'Urgell	3rd	C2
2018	30 June 2018	Kraków	1st	C1
2021	13 June 2021	Prague	2nd	C1
2021	5 September 2021	La Seu d'Urgell	2nd	C1

^{1} Pan American Championship counting for World Cup points
^{2} Oceania Championship counting for World Cup points

== Astronaut application ==
Before the 2008 Olympics Florence had applied to become an astronaut in the European Space Agency's astronaut training programme in response to an advert he had seen, and was so serious about it that he began learning Russian, a mandatory requirement for the position. However he was not among the four people selected from the 8,400 applicants and received a rejection letter a short time before the start of the Olympics. After winning his Olympic medal he said of the application; "It wasn't a whim... It was an opportunity that came along to apply for something incredible. I tried but didn't get in."

== See also ==
- Canoeing at the 2008 Summer Olympics
- Great Britain at the 2008 Summer Olympics
