= Emir Mujčinović =

Croatian canoeist

Emir Mujčinović (born 13 March 1978 in Zagreb, lives in Sydney, Australia) is a Croatian slalom canoer who has competed since the late 1990s. Became junior World Champion in 1996 with Croatian downriver canoe team. He was eliminated in the qualifying round of the C-1 event at the 2008 Summer Olympics in Beijing, finishing 15th overall while then moving on to compete in triathlons. He represented Australia at ITU World Championships at Auckland 2012, Ironman World Championships at Kona, Hawaii 2014, Ironman 70.3 World Championships at Sunshine Coast, Australia. Emir won his age division at Ironman Busselton 2016 with the time of 8h46'. Currently he is the co-owner of Pelotone - Sydney's Premier Cycling and Fitness studio and Triathlon Australia certified performance coach.
