= Ronnie Dürrenmatt =

Swiss canoeist

Ronnie Dürrenmatt (born 30 May 1979, in Grenchen) is a Swiss slalom canoeist who competed from the mid-1990s to the late 2000s, specializing in the C1 class. At the 2004 Summer Olympics in Athens, he finished 11th in the C1 event.

== World Cup individual podiums ==
Season	Date	Venue	Position	Event
2008	29 Jun 2008	Tacen	3rd	C1

== Other highlights ==
- 9th place at the 2005 World Championships
- 7th place at the 2006 European Championships
- 9-times Swiss champion between 1995-2008
