= Cameron McIntosh =

South African slalom canoeist (born 1975)

Cameron Nicholas Douglas McIntosh (born 2 December 1975 in Pietermaritzburg) is a South African slalom canoeist who competed from the late 1990s to the late 2000s. He attended Michaelhouse in the KwaZulu-Natal Midlands where he was Deputy Head Boy in 1994. He was eliminated in the qualifying round of the C2 event at the 2008 Summer Olympics in Beijing, finishing in 12th place.

McIntosh competed in K1 and C2 classes. His partner in the C2 boat was Cyprian Ngidi.

== World Cup individual podiums ==
| Season | Date | Venue | Position | Event |
|---|---|---|---|---|
| 2008 | 27 Jan 2008 | Sagana | 2nd | C2^{1} |
| 2008 | 27 Jan 2008 | Sagana | 3rd | K1^{1} |

^{1} African Championship counting for World Cup points
