= Mathilde Pichery =

French canoeist

Medal record

Women's canoe slalom

Representing France

World Championships
| Gold medal – first place | 2002 Bourg St.-Maurice | K1 team |
| Gold medal – first place | 2006 Prague | K1 team |

European Championships
| Bronze medal – third place | 2002 Bratislava | K1 team |
| Bronze medal – third place | 2006 L'Argentière-la-Bessée | K1 |
| Bronze medal – third place | 2006 L'Argentière-la-Bessée | K1 team |
| Bronze medal – third place | 2009 Nottingham | K1 |

Mathilde Pichery (born 1981) is a French slalom canoeist who competed in the 2000s.

She won two gold medals in the K1 team event at the ICF Canoe Slalom World Championships, earning them in 2002 and 2006. She also won four bronze medals at the European Championships.

== World Cup individual podiums ==
| Season | Date | Venue | Position | Event |
|---|---|---|---|---|
| 2005 | 24 Jul 2005 | La Seu d'Urgell | 3rd | K1 |
| 2006 | 2 Jul 2006 | L'Argentière-la-Bessée | 3rd | K1^{1} |
| 2009 | 28 Jun 2009 | Pau | 1st | K1 |

^{1} European Championship counting for World Cup points
