= Scott Parsons =

American canoeist

Medal record

Men's canoe slalom

Representing United States

Junior World Championships
Silver medal – second place	1994 Wausau	K1 team

Scott Parsons (born March 27, 1979, in Toledo, Ohio) is an American slalom canoeist who competed at the international level from 1994 to 2012.

Competing in three Summer Olympics, he earned his best finish of sixth in the K1 event at Athens in 2004. He finished 20th in 2008 in Beijing. At the 2012 Summer Olympics in London, he represented the United States for the third time. He finished 16th in the K1 event after being eliminated in the heats.

He qualified a US K1 slalom kayak for the 2012 Summer Olympics by finishing 15th at the 2011 World Championships, and then ensured his own qualification by finishing 11th at the 2012 Cardiff World Cup event on 9 June 2012.

Parsons attended St. John's Jesuit High School in Toledo, OH. His former wife Lauren Bixby was also a kayaker before she had to retire due to injury.

== World Cup individual podiums ==
Season	Date	Venue	Position	Event
2000	18 Jun 2000	Ocoee	3rd	K1
2006	20 Aug 2006	Madawaska	2nd	K1^{1}
2007	8 Jul 2007	Tacen	2nd	K1
2008	5 Jul 2008	Augsburg	3rd	K1

^{1} Pan American Championship counting for World Cup points
