= Chen Fubin =

Chinese canoeist

Personal information
- Native name: 陈富彬
- Nationality: Chinese
- Born: 22 January 1978 (age 48) Ziyang, Sichuan
- Height: 1.78 m (5 ft 10 in)
- Weight: 77 kg (170 lb)

Sport
- Country: China
- Sport: male sprint canoeist
- Retired: yes

Chen Fubin
- Traditional Chinese: 陳富彬
- Simplified Chinese: 陈富彬
Transcriptions
Standard Mandarin
- Hanyu Pinyin: Chén Fù Bīn

Chen Fubin (born January 22, 1978, in Ziyang) is a Chinese slalom canoer who competed in the 2000s. He finished 11th in the C-2 event at the 2004 Summer Olympics in Athens, Greece after being eliminated in the qualifying round.
