= Mark Bellofiore =

Australian slalom canoeist

Mark Bellofiore (born 13 April 1983 in Melbourne) is an Australian slalom canoeist who competed in the 2000s. Competing in two Summer Olympics, he earned his best finish of seventh in the C2 event in Beijing in 2008.

His partner in the C2 boat was Lachie Milne.

== World Cup individual podiums ==
Season	Date	Venue	Position	Event
2006	26 February 2006	Mangahao	1st	C2^{1}
2008	16 March 2008	Penrith	3rd	C2^{1}

^{1} Oceania Championship counting for World Cup points
