= Tian Qin =

Chinese slalom canoeist (born 1983)

Tian Qin (born August 30, 1983 in Hunan) is a Chinese slalom canoeist who competed in the 2000s. He finished 11th in the C2 event at the 2004 Summer Olympics in Athens, Greece after being eliminated in the qualifying round.

== World Cup individual podiums ==
Season	Date	Venue	Position	Event
2006	27 Aug 2006	Zhangjiajie	2nd	C2^{1}

^{1} Asia Canoe Slalom Championship counting for World Cup points
