= Benn Fraker =

American slalom canoeist

Thomas Bennett "Benn" Fraker (born February 23, 1989, in Rome, Georgia) is an American slalom canoeist who competed at the international level from 2004 to 2014. He finished sixth in the C1 event at the 2008 Summer Olympics in Beijing.

== Early life ==
Fraker was born in Rome, Georgia, on February 23, 1989. He soon moved to Peachtree City, Georgia, where his family resides today. His parents, Tom and Marsha Fraker, supported him by driving him to different parts of the country to paddle more challenging rivers. He has a younger brother, Davis, and a younger sister, Addie, who are involved in different athletic sports. Davis is a 4A state record holder in track and field events discus, shot put, and hammer throw. Benn had been training for over ten years in kayaking and canoeing. Initially he started by watching his father, Tom Fraker, paddle recreationally. He began playing with his dad's kayaking equipment in the pool and later attempted to paddle down rivers. He was a soccer player until he developed Sever's disease in his heel, which is caused by overuse and small injuries to the growth plates. The disease required Fraker to stay off his feet. Kayaking and canoeing allowed him to recover from the disease and still stay active in sports. He started to get involved in the sport around the age of eleven or twelve.

== Career ==
Fraker competed in many events since he was in middle school, but his first major accomplishment that set the stage for the Olympics was the Junior Pre-World Championships in 2005. He was coached by Cathy Hearn (the USACK canoe coach and multi-time world champion) and her brother Davey Hearn (three-time Olympian, and two-time World Champion) Since the World Junior Championships occurred only every other year, the major event for 2005 was the Junior Pre-World Championships. He had major competition in the C1 event and struggled with a gate penalty on the first run, but finished the event with a 192.19 total time to win the event. The Pre-Worlds allowed Fraker to compete against the best juniors in the world. Proceeding to the 2006 World Junior Championships, Fraker finished fifth setting the stage for senior level competition. Although it's a difficult task to transfer from junior to senior level competition, Fraker proceeded to win the US Team Trials in 2007 and become first boat on the senior national teams. He also finished 13th in 2007 World Cup rankings. Fraker's accomplishments led him to the 2008 Summer Olympics in Beijing. He was one of the youngest competitors in his division. He had struggles in the beginning from the pressures of his first Olympics, but he finished first in the first heat of twenty-three paddlers and finished 6th overall in the C1 event with a total time of 183.14.

== World Cup individual podiums ==
Season	Date	Venue	Position	Event
2008	26 Apr 2008	Charlotte	2nd	C1^{1}

^{1} Pan American Championship counting for World Cup points
