= Lachie Milne =

Australian canoeist

Lachlan "Lachie" Milne (born 26 August 1978 in Melbourne) is an Australian slalom canoeist who competed from the mid-1990s to the late 2000s. Competing in two Summer Olympics, he earned his best finish of seventh in the C2 event in Beijing in 2008.

His partner in the C2 boat was Mark Bellofiore.

== World Cup individual podiums ==
Season	Date	Venue	Position	Event
2006	26 Feb 2006	Mangahao	1st	C2^{1}
2008	16 Mar 2008	Penrith	3rd	C2^{1}

^{1} Oceania Championship counting for World Cup points
