= Erik Masoero =

Italian canoeist (born 1976)

Medal record

Men's canoe slalom

Representing Italy

World Championships
| Bronze medal – third place | 2007 Foz do Iguaçu | C2 |

European Championships
| Bronze medal – third place | 2008 Kraków | C2 |

Erik Masoero (born 2 January 1976 in Turin) is an Italian slalom canoeist who competed at the international level from 1992 to 2013.

He won a bronze medal in the C2 event at the 2007 ICF Canoe Slalom World Championships in Foz do Iguaçu and again at the 2008 European Championships in Kraków.

Masoero also competed in two Summer Olympics, earning his best finish of fifth in the C2 event in Beijing in 2008.

His partner in the C2 boat for most of his career was Andrea Benetti.

== World Cup individual podiums ==
| Season | Date | Venue | Position | Event |
|---|---|---|---|---|
| 2006 | 11 Jun 2006 | La Seu d'Urgell | 2nd | C2 |
