= Andrea Benetti (canoeist) =

Italian slalom canoeist

Medal record

Men's canoe slalom

Representing Italy

World Championships
Bronze medal – third place	2007 Foz do Iguaçu	C2

European Championships
Bronze medal – third place	2008 Kraków	C2

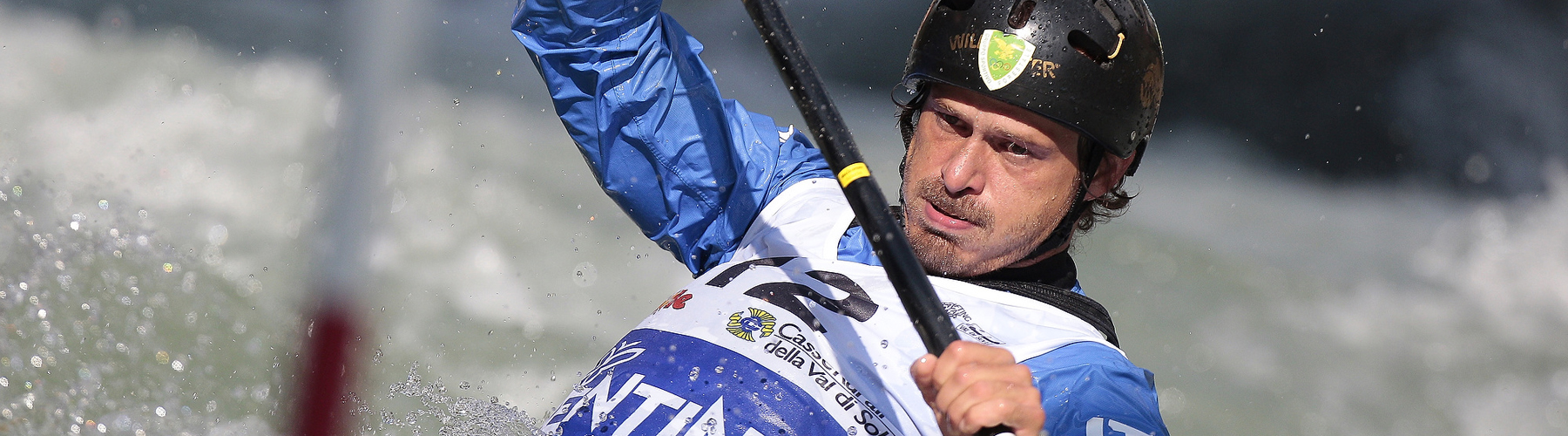
Andrea Benetti a Mezzana 2013 in C1

Andrea Benetti (born 28 June 1980 in Turin) is an Italian slalom canoeist who competed at the international level from 1997 to 2013.

He won a bronze medal in the C2 event at the 2007 ICF Canoe Slalom World Championships in Foz do Iguaçu and again at the 2008 European Championships in Kraków.

Benetti also competed in two Summer Olympics, earning his best finish of fifth in the C2 event in Beijing in 2008.

His partner in the C2 boat for most of his career was Erik Masoero.

== World Cup individual podiums ==
Season	Date	Venue	Position	Event
2006	11 Jun 2006	La Seu d'Urgell	2nd	C2
