= Ander Elosegi =

Spanish slalom canoeist

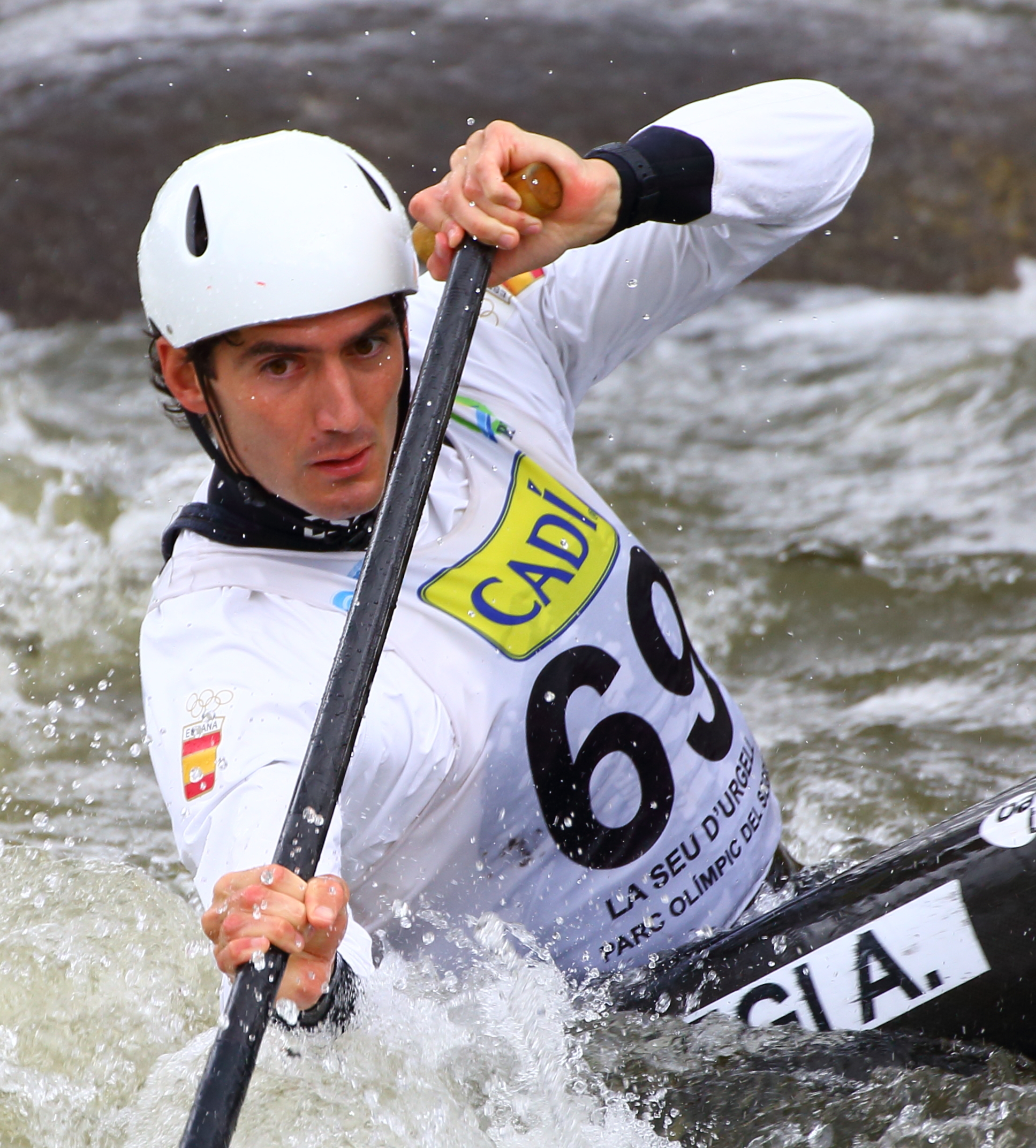

Personal information
- Full name: Ander Elosegi Alkain
- Nationality: Spanish
- Born: 14 November 1987 (age 38) Irun, Spain
- Height: 1.86 m (6 ft 1 in)
- Weight: 80 kg (176 lb)

Sport
- Country: Spain
- Sport: Canoe slalom
- Event: C1
- Club: SD Santiagotarrak
Medal record
Men's canoe slalom
Representing Spain
World Championships
Silver medal – second place	2019 La Seu d'Urgell	C1
Silver medal – second place	2019 La Seu d'Urgell	C1 team
Bronze medal – third place	2009 La Seu d'Urgell	C1 team
European Championships
Bronze medal – third place	2016 Liptovský Mikuláš	C1
Bronze medal – third place	2022 Liptovský Mikuláš	C1 team
U23 European Championships
Bronze medal – third place	2009 Liptovský Mikuláš	C1

Ander Elosegi Alkain (born 14 November 1987) is a Spanish-Basque slalom canoeist who has competed at the international level since 2003.

He won a three medals at the ICF Canoe Slalom World Championships with two silvers (C1: 2019, C1 team: 2019) and a bronze (C1 team: 2009), all in La Seu d'Urgell. He also won two bronze medals at the European Championships.

Elosegi participated in four Olympic Games. He finished fourth in the C1 event at the 2008 Summer Olympics in Beijing and again in the same event at the 2012 Summer Olympics in London. At the 2016 Summer Olympics in Rio de Janeiro he finished 8th in the C1 event. He has qualified to represent Spain again at the 2020 Summer Olympics and he finished 8th in the C1 event.

== World Cup individual podiums ==
Season	Date	Venue	Position	Event
2010	27 June 2010	La Seu d'Urgell	3rd	C1
2011	2 July 2011	L'Argentière-la-Bessée	2nd	C1
2013	6 July 2013	La Seu d'Urgell	2nd	C1
