= Erik Pfannmöller =

German slalom canoeist (born 1985)

- Born: 7 February 1985 (age 40)
- Occupation(s): Businessman, former slalom canoeist

Erik Pfannmöller
Medal record

Men's canoe slalom

Representing Germany

World Championships
Gold medal – first place	2007 Foz do Iguaçu	K1 team

European Championships
Silver medal – second place	2005 Tacen	K1 team
Silver medal – second place	2006 L'Argentière-la-Bessée	K1
Silver medal – second place	2007 Liptovský Mikuláš	K1 team
Bronze medal – third place	2005 Tacen	K1
Bronze medal – third place	2006 L'Argentière-la-Bessée	K1 team

U23 European Championships
Gold medal – first place	2004 Kraków	K1 team

Junior World Championships
Silver medal – second place	2002 Nowy Sącz	K1 team

Junior European Championships
Gold medal – first place	2001 Bratislava	K1 team
Gold medal – first place	2003 Hohenlimburg	K1 team
Silver medal – second place	2003 Hohenlimburg	K1

Erik Pfannmöller (born 7 February 1985 in Halle (Saale)) is a German slalom canoeist who competed at the international level from 2001 to 2008. After quitting his successful sports career in 2009, Pfannmöller became a businessman, founding three companies as of 2017.

Pfannmöller won a gold medal in the K1 team event at the 2007 ICF Canoe Slalom World Championships in Foz do Iguaçu. He won the overall World Cup title in K1 in 2006 and 2008. He also won five medals at the European Championships (3 silvers and 2 bronzes).

== World Cup individual podiums ==
Season	Date	Venue	Position	Event
2005	26 June 2005	Tacen	3rd	K1^{1}
2005	24 July 2005	La Seu d'Urgell	2nd	K1
2006	28 May 2006	Athens	2nd	K1
2006	3 June 2006	Augsburg	1st	K1
2006	2 July 2006	L'Argentière-la-Bessée	2nd	K1^{1}
2007	14 July 2007	Augsburg	2nd	K1
2008	22 June 2008	Prague	2nd	K1
2008	5 July 2008	Augsburg	1st	K1

^{1} European Championship counting for World Cup points

== Business career ==
In 2010, he graduated from the HHL Leipzig Graduate School of Management with a degree in business administration. In January 2010, he founded the company "Teambon", which was acquired by DailyDeal just two months later. In April 2010, he founded the Berlin-based startup "mysportbrands" together with Albert Schwarzmeier. Since 2015, he is founder and CEO of "Solvemate", a B2B SaaS company that uses machine learning to automate customer service with the help of chatbots.
