= Pierre Luquet =

French slalom canoeist

Medal record

Men's canoe slalom

Representing France

World Championships
Gold medal – first place	2002 Bourg St.-Maurice	C2 team
Silver medal – second place	2002 Bourg St.-Maurice	C2
Silver medal – second place	2007 Foz do Iguaçu	C2
Silver medal – second place	2007 Foz do Iguaçu	C2 team

European Championships
Silver medal – second place	2006 L'Argentière-la-Bessée	C2 team
Bronze medal – third place	2005 Tacen	C2 team

Junior World Championships
Bronze medal – third place	1992 Sjoa	C2

Pierre Luquet (born 19 December 1975 in Bagnères-de-Bigorre) is a French slalom canoeist who competed at the international level from 1992 to 2009 exclusively in the C2 class together with his twin brother Christophe.

He won four medals at the ICF Canoe Slalom World Championships with a gold (C2 team: 2002) and three silvers (C2: 2002, 2007, C2 team: 2007). He also won a silver and a bronze in the C2 team event at the European Championships.

== World Cup individual podiums ==
Season	Date	Venue	Position	Event
1996	9 Jun 1996	La Seu d'Urgell	3rd	C2
2001	27 May 2001	Goumois	3rd	C2
2006	28 May 2006	Athens	2nd	C2
