= David Ford (canoeist) =

Canadian slalom canoeist

Personal information
- Born: March 23, 1967 (age 59) Edmonton, Alberta
Medal record
Men's canoe slalom
Representing Canada
World Championships
Gold medal – first place	1999 La Seu d'Urgell	K1
Silver medal – second place	2003 Augsburg	K1

David Watson Ford (born March 23, 1967, in Edmonton, Alberta) is a Canadian slalom canoeist who has competed since the mid-1980s and is still actively competing. He is Canada's most successful slalom paddler.

== Career ==
Ford has won two medals in the K1 event at the ICF Canoe Slalom World Championships. In 1999 he became the first non-European to win the World Championship title. Ford followed up with a World Championship silver in 2003. In 2003 he also won the overall World Cup title in K1. He was named Male Athlete of the Year at the 2003 Canadian Sport Awards, and was inducted into the BC Sports Hall of Fame in 2005.

Ford has competed in five Summer Olympics, earning a fourth-place finish in the K1 event in Athens in 2004. He had a sixth-place finish in the same event in 2008 in Beijing. Ford could not get a sixth appearance in the 2012 Summer Olympics, as of his elbow tendons had ruptured prior to the qualifier, and with no time for the required surgery, countless injections were unable to produce an adequate result for him to paddle to his abilities.

== World Cup individual podiums ==
	1st place, gold medalist(s)	2nd place, silver medalist(s)	3rd place, bronze medalist(s)	Total
K1	5	1	8	14

Season	Date	Venue	Position	Event
1991	6 July 1991	Augsburg	3rd	K1
1992	7 June 1992	Merano	1st	K1
1995	1 October 1995	Ocoee	3rd	K1
1998	2 August 1998	Wausau	3rd	K1
2001	5 August 2001	Prague	3rd	K1
2002	26 May 2002	Guangzhou	3rd	K1
2002	28 July 2002	Tacen	3rd	K1
2002	15 September 2002	Tibagi	1st	K1
2003	11 May 2003	Penrith	1st	K1
2003	3 August 2003	Bratislava	3rd	K1
2004	30 May 2004	Merano	2nd	K1
2005	27 August 2005	Kern River	1st	K1^{1}
2006	20 August 2006	Madawaska	1st	K1^{1}
2009	3 August 2009	Kananaskis	3rd	K1^{1}

^{1} Pan American Championship counting for World Cup points

== Personal life ==
On April 25, 2009, Ford married Canadian alpine skier Kelly VanderBeek. They have a son, Cooper.
