= Li Jingjing (canoeist) =

Chinese canoeist

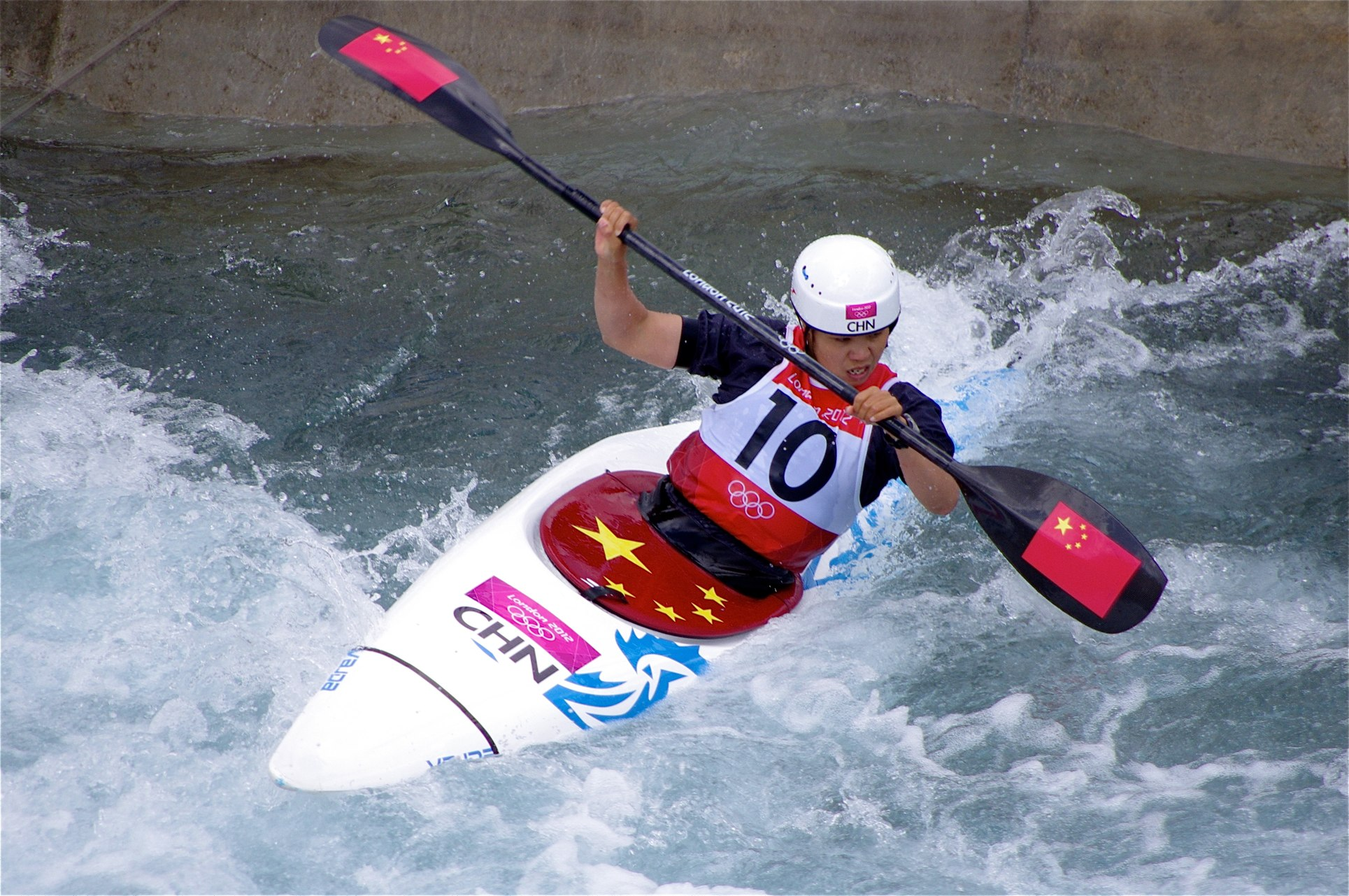
- Li Jingjing at the 2012 Summer Olympics

Personal information
- Native name: 李晶晶
- Nationality: Chinese
- Born: 1 February 1985 (age 41) Changle, Fuzhou
- Height: 1.69 m (5 ft 7 in)
- Weight: 55 kg (121 lb)

Sport
- Country: China
- Sport: Canoe slalom
- Event: K1
- Retired: 2013
Medal record
Women's canoe slalom
Representing China
Asian Championships
Gold medal – first place	2010 Xiasi	K1 team
Bronze medal – third place	2010 Xiasi	K1

Li Jingjing (born February 1, 1985, in Changle, Fuzhou) is a Chinese slalom canoeist who competed at the international level from 2002 to 2013. At the 2004 Summer Olympics in Athens, she was eliminated in the qualifying round of the K1 event, finishing in 18th place. Four years later in Beijing, Li was eliminated in the semifinals of the same event. She was classified in 13th place. At the 2012 Summer Olympics in London she was once again eliminated in the semifinal of the K1 event, finishing in 11th place.

== World Cup individual podiums ==
Season	Date	Venue	Position	Event
2006	27 Aug 2006	Zhangjiajie	2nd	K1^{1}
2008	16 Mar 2008	Penrith	3rd	K1^{2}
2008	29 Jun 2008	Tacen	2nd	K1

^{1} Asia Canoe Slalom Championship counting for World Cup points
^{2} Oceania Championship counting for World Cup points
