= Marcus Becker =

German canoeist (born 1981)

Medal record

Men's canoe slalom

Representing Germany

Olympic Games
Silver medal – second place	2004 Athens	C2

World Championships
Gold medal – first place	2003 Augsburg	C2
Silver medal – second place	2003 Augsburg	C2 team
Silver medal – second place	2006 Prague	C2
Silver medal – second place	2006 Prague	C2 team
Silver medal – second place	2009 La Seu d'Urgell	C2 team
Bronze medal – third place	2005 Penrith	C2

European Championships
Gold medal – first place	2008 Kraków	C2 team
Silver medal – second place	2005 Tacen	C2 team
Silver medal – second place	2011 La Seu d'Urgell	C2 team

Junior World Championships
Gold medal – first place	1998 Lofer	C2

Junior European Championships
Gold medal – first place	1999 Solkan	C2

Marcus Becker (born 11 September 1981 in Merseburg) is a German slalom canoeist who competed at the international level from 1996 to 2011. He won a silver medal in the C2 event at the 2004 Summer Olympics in Athens.

Becker won six medals at the ICF Canoe Slalom World Championships with a gold (C2: 2003), four silvers (C2: 2006, C2 team: 2003, 2006, 2009), and a bronze (C2: 2005). He also won a gold and two silvers in the C2 team event at the European Championships.

His partner in the C2 boat throughout his career was Stefan Henze.

== World Cup individual podiums ==
	1st place, gold medalist(s)	2nd place, silver medalist(s)	3rd place, bronze medalist(s)	Total
C2	3	3	4	10

Season	Date	Venue	Position	Event
2001	28 July 2001	Augsburg	3rd	C2
2003	3 August 2003	Bratislava	2nd	C2
2004	30 May 2004	Merano	2nd	C2
2005	16 July 2005	Augsburg	1st	C2
2005	2 October 2005	Penrith	3rd	C2^{1}
2006	3 June 2006	Augsburg	1st	C2
2006	5 August 2006	Prague	2nd	C2^{1}
2009	5 July 2009	Bratislava	3rd	C2
2009	11 July 2009	Augsburg	1st	C2
2010	27 June 2010	La Seu d'Urgell	3rd	C2

^{1} World Championship counting for World Cup points
