= Siboniso Cele =

South African slalom canoeist

Siboniso Master Cele (born 23 March 1985 in Pietermaritzburg) is a South African slalom canoeist who competed at the international level from 2003 to 2010. He was eliminated in the qualifying round of the C1 event at the 2008 Summer Olympics in Beijing, finishing in 16th place.

== World Cup individual podiums ==
Season	Date	Venue	Position	Event
2008	27 January 2008	Sagana	1st	C1^{1}
2008	27 January 2008	Sagana	3rd	C2^{1}

^{1} African Championship counting for World Cup points
