= Stefan Henze =

German canoeist

Personal information
- Nationality: German
- Born: 3 May 1981 Halle, East Germany
- Died: 15 August 2016 (aged 35) Rio de Janeiro, Brazil
- Height: 1.77 m (5 ft 10 in)
- Weight: 75 kg (165 lb)

Sport
- Country: Germany
- Sport: Canoe slalom
- Event: C2
Medal record
Men's canoe slalom
Representing Germany
Olympic Games
Silver medal – second place	2004 Athens	C2
World Championships
Gold medal – first place	2003 Augsburg	C2
Silver medal – second place	2003 Augsburg	C2 team
Silver medal – second place	2006 Prague	C2
Silver medal – second place	2006 Prague	C2 team
Silver medal – second place	2009 La Seu d'Urgell	C2 team
Bronze medal – third place	2005 Penrith	C2
European Championships
Gold medal – first place	2008 Kraków	C2 team
Silver medal – second place	2005 Tacen	C2 team
Silver medal – second place	2011 La Seu d'Urgell	C2 team
Junior World Championships
Gold medal – first place	1998 Lofer	C2
Junior European Championships
Gold medal – first place	1999 Solkan	C2

Stefan Henze (3 May 1981 – 15 August 2016) was a German slalom canoeist who competed at the international level from 1996 to 2011.

== Career ==
Henze won a silver medal in the C2 event at the 2004 Summer Olympics in Athens.

He also won six medals at the ICF Canoe Slalom World Championships with a gold (C2: 2003), four silvers (C2: 2006, C2 team: 2003, 2006, 2009), and a bronze (C2: 2005). He won a gold and two silvers in the C2 team event at the European Championships.

His partner in the C2 boat throughout his career was Marcus Becker.

His father Jürgen Henze is world champion in the C2 team event from 1975 and his older brother Frank Henze is also a canoe slalom racer and multiple world championship medalist.

== World Cup individual podiums ==
	1st place, gold medalist(s)	2nd place, silver medalist(s)	3rd place, bronze medalist(s)	Total
C2	3	3	4	10

Season	Date	Venue	Position	Event
2001	28 Jul 2001	Augsburg	3rd	C2
2003	3 Aug 2003	Bratislava	2nd	C2
2004	30 May 2004	Merano	2nd	C2
2005	16 Jul 2005	Augsburg	1st	C2
2005	2 Oct 2005	Penrith	3rd	C2^{1}
2006	3 Jun 2006	Augsburg	1st	C2
2006	5 Aug 2006	Prague	2nd	C2^{1}
2009	5 Jul 2009	Bratislava	3rd	C2
2009	11 Jul 2009	Augsburg	1st	C2
2010	27 Jun 2010	La Seu d'Urgell	3rd	C2

^{1} World Championship counting for World Cup points

== Death ==
On 12 August 2016, Henze suffered serious head injuries after a car crash in Rio de Janeiro, where he coached during the 2016 Summer Olympics, and died three days later. Henze donated his organs. After he died, his heart, his liver and both of his kidneys were transplanted into seriously ill people in a hospital in Rio de Janeiro.
