= James Cartwright (canoeist) =

Canadian canoeist

James Cartwright-Garland (born 16 June 1976 in North Vancouver, British Columbia) is a Canadian slalom canoeist who competed from the mid-1990s to the late 2000s. Competing in three Summer Olympics, he earned his best finish of ninth in the C1 event in Athens in 2004.

== World Cup individual podiums ==
Season	Date	Venue	Position	Event
2005	27 Aug 2005	Kern River	2nd	C1^{1}
2006	20 Aug 2006	Madawaska	1st	C1^{1}
2009	3 Aug 2009	Kananaskis	1st	C1^{1}

^{1} Pan American Championship counting for World Cup points
