= Mangahao River =

Coordinates: 40°23′S 175°50′E

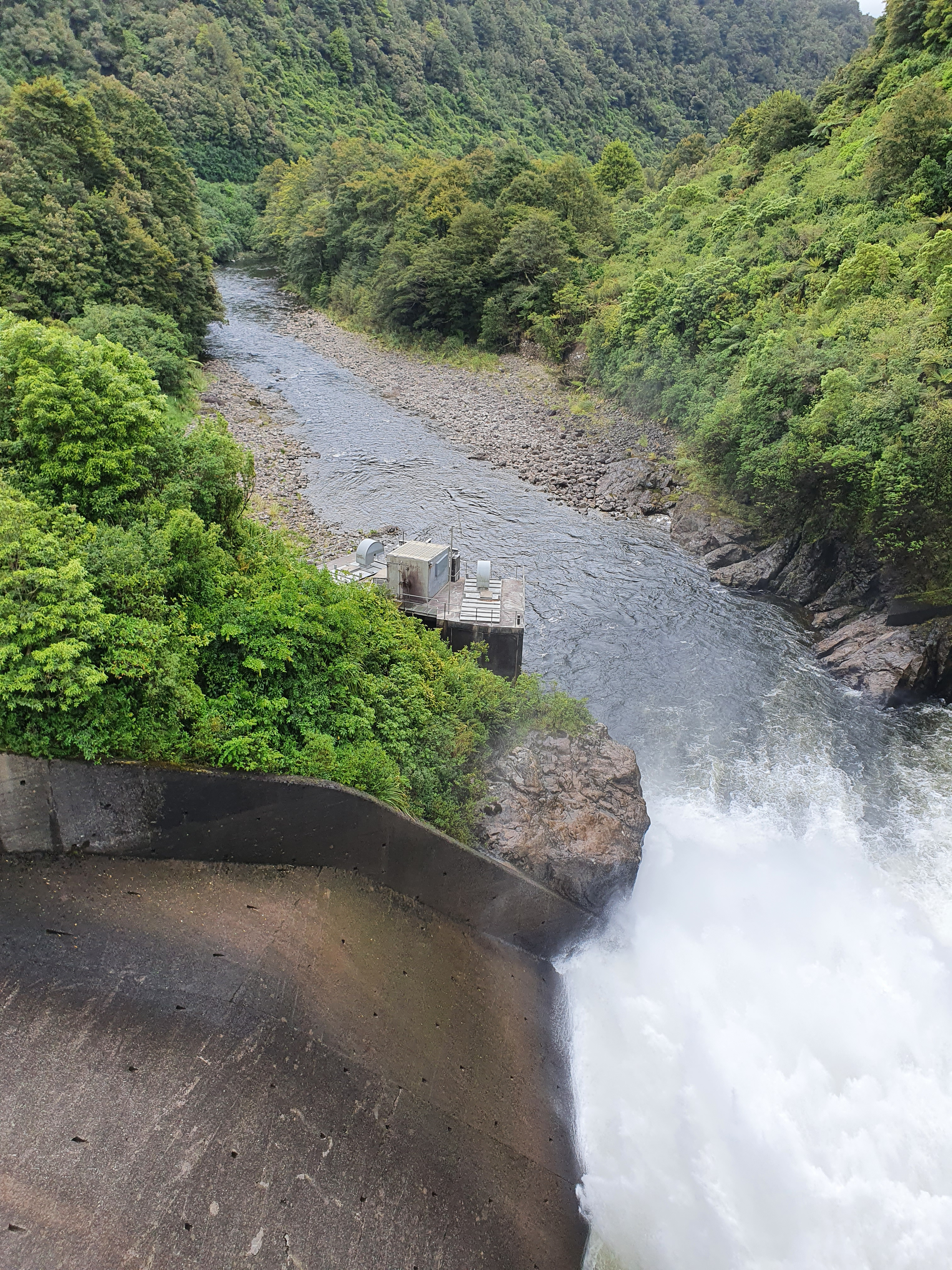
- Mangahao River flowing downstream from Mangahao Upper No. 1 Reservoir

Location
- Country: New Zealand

Physical characteristics
- Source
  - location: Tararua Range
- Mouth
  - location: Manawatū River
- Length: 86 km

The Mangahao River is located in the North Island of New Zealand. The headwaters are in the Tararua Ranges. The river flows northeast feeds into the Manawatū River south of Woodville.

There are two dams on the river which tunnel water, via a third reservoir on the Tokomaru River, to the Mangahao Power Station located on the Mangaore Stream near Shannon.

== Geology ==
Within the last 10,000 years the upper 30 km (19 mi) of the river has been captured at Kakariki from the Hukanui Stream, which feeds the Mangatainoka River. The crush zone of the Wellington Fault probably assisted the capture.

The capture has deepened the gorge cut into the Mesozoic greywacke and argillite of the Tararuas, which in places is over 100 m (330 ft) deep.
