= List of 2008 Summer Olympics medal winners =

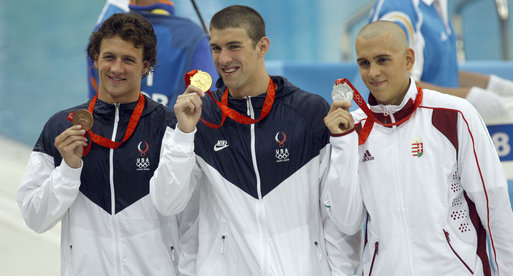
Ryan Lochte (bronze), Michael Phelps (gold), and László Cseh (silver) show the medals they earned from the men's 400 metre individual medley.

The 2008 Summer Olympics were held in Beijing, People's Republic of China, from 8 August to 24 August 2008.^{[Note 1]} A total of 10,942 athletes from 204 National Olympic Committees (NOC) participated. Overall, 302 events in 28 sports were held; 165 events were opened to men, 127 were opened to women and 10 were mixed events. In total there was one more event than in the 2004 Summer Olympics in Athens, Greece.

Nine new events were held, including two from the new cycling discipline of BMX. Women competed in the 3000 metre steeplechase for the first time. Marathon open water swimming events for men and women, over the distance of 10 kilometres, were added to the swimming discipline. Team events (men and women) in table tennis replaced the doubles events. In fencing, women's team foil and women's team sabre replaced men's team foil and women's team épée.^{[Note 2]} Two sports were open only to men, baseball and boxing, while one sport and one discipline were open only to women, softball and synchronized swimming. Equestrian is the only sport in which men and women compete together in the same events. Baseball and softball may have made their last appearances in Olympics history during these Games, as the International Olympic Committee voted to remove them from the programme of the 2012 Olympics. A total of 958 medals for events (302 gold, 303 silver and 353 bronze) were awarded. In boxing, judo, taekwondo and wrestling, two bronze medals are awarded in each weight class. Therefore, the total number of bronze medals is greater than the total number of gold or silver medals. Additionally, there were ties for a silver medal and two bronze medals.

A total of 1,881 individual athletes won medals. Chinese athletes won the most gold medals with 48 (100 total), and the United States won the most total medals with 112 (including 36 gold). Athletes from 87 countries won medals, while 55 nations won at least one gold medal, both setting new records for Olympic Games. Athletes from Afghanistan (Rohullah Nikpai – Taekwondo, men's 58 kg), Mauritius (Bruno Julie – boxing, bantamweight), Sudan (Ismail Ahmed Ismail – athletics, men's 800 m), Tajikistan (Rasul Boqiev – judo, men's 73 kg), and Togo (Benjamin Boukpeti – canoeing, men's K-1 slalom) won their NOCs' first Olympic medal. Athletes from Mongolia (Naidangiin Tüvshinbayar – judo, men's 100 kg), and Panama (Irving Saladino – athletics, men's long jump) won their nations' first gold medal.

American swimmer Michael Phelps was the most successful athlete, winning eight gold medals and setting a new record for most golds won in a single edition of the Olympics (the previous record, seven, had been set in 1972 by Mark Spitz). Phelps also set a new record for most career gold medals (14), and his 16 total medals were ranked second all-time behind Soviet gymnast Larisa Latynina (18) at the time. In 2012 Phelps set a record for most total medals. Several records for career medals in a sport were tied or surpassed, including cycling (Bradley Wiggins of the United Kingdom won two gold, tied for record with six career medals); judo (Ryoko Tani of Japan won a bronze, five career medals); softball (Laura Berg of the United States won a gold and Natalie Ward, Melanie Roche and Tanya Harding of Australia won a bronze; all have four career medals); swimming (Michael Phelps, 16 career medals); taekwondo (Steven López of the United States won a bronze and Hadi Saei of Iran won a gold, both three career medals); and table tennis (Wang Nan of China won a gold and silver medal, five career medals).

The 2008 Olympics had the most medals stripped for doping violations (50). The leading country is Russia with 14 medals stripped.

== Archery ==
Event	Gold	Silver	Bronze
Men's individual	Viktor Ruban; Ukraine	Park Kyung-Mo; South Korea	Bair Badënov; Russia
Women's individual	Zhang Juanjuan; China	Park Sung-hyun; South Korea	Yun Ok-hee; South Korea
Men's team	South Korea; Im Dong-Hyun; Lee Chang-hwan; Park Kyung-Mo	Italy; Ilario Di Buò; Marco Galiazzo; Mauro Nespoli	China; Jiang Lin; Li Wenquan; Xue Haifeng
Women's team	South Korea; Joo Hyun-Jung; Park Sung-hyun; Yun Ok-hee	China; Chen Ling; Guo Dan; Zhang Juanjuan	France; Virginie Arnold; Sophie Dodemont; Bérengère Schuh

== Athletics ==
Event	Gold	Silver	Bronze
Men's 100 m	Usain Bolt; Jamaica	Richard Thompson; Trinidad and Tobago	Walter Dix; United States
Women's 100 m	Shelly-Ann Fraser; Jamaica	Sherone Simpson; Jamaica	None
Women's 100 m	Shelly-Ann Fraser; Jamaica	Kerron Stewart; Jamaica	None
Men's 200 m	Usain Bolt; Jamaica	Shawn Crawford; United States	Walter Dix; United States
Women's 200 m	Veronica Campbell-Brown; Jamaica	Allyson Felix; United States	Kerron Stewart; Jamaica
Men's 400 m	LaShawn Merritt; United States	Jeremy Wariner; United States	David Neville; United States
Women's 400 m	Christine Ohuruogu; Great Britain	Shericka Williams; Jamaica	Sanya Richards; United States
Men's 800 m	Wilfred Kipkemboi Bungei; Kenya	Ismail Ahmed Ismail; Sudan	Alfred Kirwa Yego; Kenya
Women's 800 m	Pamela Jelimo; Kenya	Janeth Jepkosgei Busienei; Kenya	Hasna Benhassi; Morocco
Men's 1500 m	Asbel Kipruto Kiprop; Kenya	Nicholas Willis; New Zealand	Mehdi Baala; France
Women's 1500 m	Nancy Jebet Langat; Kenya	Iryna Lishchynska; Ukraine	Nataliya Tobias; Ukraine
Men's 5000 m	Kenenisa Bekele; Ethiopia	Eliud Kipchoge; Kenya	Edwin Cheruiyot Soi; Kenya
Women's 5000 m	Tirunesh Dibaba Kenene; Ethiopia	Meseret Defar Tola; Ethiopia	Sylvia Kibet; Kenya
Men's 10,000 m	Kenenisa Bekele; Ethiopia	Sileshi Sihine; Ethiopia	Micah Kemboi Kogo; Kenya
Women's 10,000 m	Tirunesh Dibaba Kenene; Ethiopia	Shalane Flanagan; United States	Linet Chepkwemoi Masai; Kenya
Men's marathon	Samuel Kamau Wanjiru; Kenya	Jaouad Gharib; Morocco	Tsegaye Kebede Wordofa; Ethiopia
Women's marathon	Constantina Diţă-Tomescu; Romania	Catherine Nyambura Ndereba; Kenya	Zhou Chunxiu; China
Men's 110 m hurdles	Dayron Robles; Cuba	David Payne; United States	David Oliver; United States
Women's 100 m hurdles	Dawn Harper; United States	Sally McLellan; Australia	Priscilla Lopes-Schliep; Canada
Men's 400 m hurdles	Angelo Taylor; United States	Kerron Clement; United States	Bershawn Jackson; United States
Women's 400 m hurdles	Melaine Walker; Jamaica	Sheena Tosta; United States	Tasha Danvers; Great Britain
Men's 3000 m steeplechase	Brimin Kipruto; Kenya	Mahiedine Mekhissi-Benabbad; France	Richard Kipkemboi Mateelong; Kenya
Women's 3000 m steeplechase	Gulnara Samitova-Galkina; Russia	Eunice Jepkorir; Kenya	Yekaterina Volkova; Russia
Men's 4 × 100 m relay	Trinidad and Tobago; Keston Bledman; Marc Burns; Emmanuel Callender; Richard Thompson; Aaron Armstrong	Japan; Naoki Tsukahara; Shingo Suetsugu; Shinji Takahira; Nobuharu Asahara	Brazil; Vicente Lima; Sandro Viana; Bruno de Barros; José Carlos Moreira
Women's 4 × 100 m relay	Belgium; Olivia Borlée; Hanna Mariën; Élodie Ouédraogo; Kim Gevaert	Nigeria; Ene Franca Idoko; Gloria Kemasuode; Halimat Ismaila; Oludamola Osayomi; Agnes Osazuwa	Brazil; Rosemar Coelho Neto; Lucimar de Moura; Thaissa Presti; Rosângela Santos
Men's 4 × 400 m relay	United States; LaShawn Merritt; Angelo Taylor; David Neville; Jeremy Wariner; Kerron Clement; Reggie Witherspoon	Bahamas; Andretti Bain; Michael Mathieu; Andrae Williams; Christopher Brown; Avard Moncur; Ramon Miller	Great Britain; Martyn Rooney; Andrew Steele; Robert Tobin; Michael Bingham
Women's 4 × 400 m relay	United States; Mary Wineberg; Allyson Felix; Monique Henderson; Sanya Richards; Natasha Hastings	Jamaica; Shericka Williams; Shereefa Lloyd; Rosemarie Whyte; Novlene Williams; Bobby-Gaye Wilkins	Great Britain; Christine Ohuruogu; Kelly Sotherton; Marilyn Okoro; Nicola Sanders
Men's 20 km walk	Valeriy Borchin; Russia	Jefferson Pérez; Ecuador	Jared Tallent; Australia
Women's 20 km walk	Olga Kaniskina; Russia	Kjersti Tysse Plätzer; Norway	Elisa Rigaudo; Italy
Men's 50 km walk	Alex Schwazer; Italy	Jared Tallent; Australia	Denis Nizhegorodov; Russia
Men's high jump	Andrey Silnov; Russia	Germaine Mason; Great Britain	Yaroslav Rybakov; Russia
Women's high jump	Tia Hellebaut; Belgium	Blanka Vlašić; Croatia	Anna Chicherova; Russia
Men's pole vault	Steven Hooker; Australia	Yevgeny Lukyanenko; Russia	Derek Miles; United States
Women's pole vault	Yelena Isinbayeva; Russia	Jennifer Stuczynski; United States	Svetlana Feofanova; Russia
Men's long jump	Irving Saladino; Panama	Godfrey Khotso Mokoena; South Africa	Ibrahim Camejo; Cuba
Women's long jump	Maurren Higa Maggi; Brazil	Blessing Okagbare; Nigeria	Chelsea Hammond; Jamaica
Men's triple jump	Nelson Évora; Portugal	Phillips Idowu; Great Britain	Leevan Sands; Bahamas
Women's triple jump	Françoise Mbango Etone; Cameroon	Olga Rypakova; Kazakhstan	Yargelis Savigne; Cuba
Men's shot put	Tomasz Majewski; Poland	Christian Cantwell; United States	Dylan Armstrong; Canada
Women's shot put	Valerie Vili; New Zealand	Dylan Armstrong; Cuba	Gong Lijiao; China
Men's discus throw	Gerd Kanter; Estonia	Piotr Małachowski; Poland	Virgilijus Alekna; Lithuania
Women's discus throw	Stephanie Brown Trafton; United States	Olena Antonova; Ukraine	Song Aimin; China
Men's hammer throw	Primož Kozmus; Slovenia	Vadim Devyatovskiy ^{[A]} Belarus	Ivan Tsikhan ^{[A]} Belarus
Women's hammer throw	Yipsi Moreno; Cuba	Zhang Wenxiu; China	Manuela Montebrun; France
Men's javelin throw	Andreas Thorkildsen; Norway	Ainārs Kovals; Latvia	Tero Pitkämäki; Finland
Women's javelin throw	Barbora Špotáková; Czech Republic	Mariya Abakumova; Russia	Christina Obergföll; Germany
Men's decathlon	Bryan Clay; United States	Andrei Krauchanka; Belarus	Leonel Suárez; Cuba
Women's heptathlon	Nataliya Dobrynska; Ukraine	Hyleas Fountain ^{[B]} United States	Tatyana Chernova ^{[B]} Russia

== Badminton ==
Event	Gold	Silver	Bronze
Men's singles	Lin Dan; China	Lee Chong Wei; Malaysia	Chen Jin; China
Women's singles	Zhang Ning; China	Xie Xingfang; China	Maria Kristin Yulianti; Indonesia
Men's doubles	Indonesia; Markis Kido; Hendra Setiawan	China; Cai Yun; Fu Haifeng	South Korea; Hwang Ji-man; Lee Jae-jin
Women's doubles	China; Du Jing; Yu Yang	South Korea; Lee Hyo-jung; Lee Kyung-won	China; Wei Yili; Zhang Yawen
Mixed doubles	South Korea; Lee Yong-dae; Lee Hyo-jung	Indonesia; Nova Widianto; Liliyana Natsir	China; He Hanbin; Yu Yang

== Baseball ==
Event	Gold	Silver	Bronze
Men's team	South Korea; Ryu Hyun-Jin; Han Ki-Joo; Park Jin-Man; Kwon Hyuk; Lee Taek-Keun; Lee Dae-Ho; Oh Seung-Hwan; Bong Jung-Keun; Ko Young-Min; Lee Jong-Wook; Jeong Keun-Woo; Kim Min-Jae; Jin Kab-Yong; Lee Jin-Young; Jang Won-Sam; Song Seung-Jun; Kim Kwang-Hyun; Lee Yong-Kyu; Kim Dong-Joo; Kang Min-Ho; Hyun-soo Kim; Lee Seung-Yeop; Chong Tae-Hyon; Yoon Suk-Min	Cuba; Ariel Pestano; Yoandry Urgellés; Alfredo Despaigne; Luis Rodríguez; Alexei Bell; Yadier Pedroso; Jonder Martínez; Adiel Palma; Luis Navas; Giorvis Duvergel; Alexander Mayeta; Eriel Sánchez; Rolando Meriño; Héctor Olivera; Michel Enríquez; Yuliesky Gourriel; Vicyohandry Odelín; Pedro Luis Lazo; Eduardo Paret; Norberto González; Norge Luis Vera; Frederich Cepeda; Elier Sánchez; Miguel Lahera	United States; Brett Anderson; Blaine Neal; Matt Brown; Nate Schierholtz; Jeremy Cummings; Michael Koplove; Terry Tiffee; Kevin Jepsen; Brian Duensing; Dexter Fowler; Brandon Knight; Mike Hessman; Casey Weathers; Jason Donald; Jayson Nix; Taylor Teagarden; Stephen Strasburg; Jake Arrieta; Lou Marson; Matt LaPorta; Trevor Cahill; Brian Barden; John Gall; Jeff Stevens

== Basketball ==
Event	Gold	Silver	Bronze
Men's team	United States; Carmelo Anthony; Carlos Boozer; Chris Bosh; Kobe Bryant; Dwight Howard; LeBron James; Jason Kidd; Chris Paul; Tayshaun Prince; Michael Redd; Dwyane Wade	Spain; José Calderón; Rudy Fernández; Jorge Garbajosa; Marc Gasol; Pau Gasol; Carlos Jiménez; Raúl López; Álex Mumbrú; Juan Carlos Navarro; Felipe Reyes; Berni Rodríguez; Ricky Rubio	Argentina; Carlos Delfino; Manu Ginóbili; Román González; Juan Pedro Gutiérrez; Leonardo Gutiérrez; Federico Kammerichs; Andrés Nocioni; Fabricio Oberto; Antonio Porta; Pablo Prigioni; Paolo Quinteros; Luis Scola
Women's team	United States; Seimone Augustus; Sue Bird; Tamika Catchings; Sylvia Fowles; Kara Lawson; Lisa Leslie; DeLisha Milton-Jones; Candace Parker; Cappie Pondexter; Katie Smith; Diana Taurasi; Tina Thompson	Australia; Suzy Batkovic; Tully Bevilaqua; Rohanee Cox; Hollie Grima; Kristi Harrower; Lauren Jackson; Erin Phillips; Emma Randall; Jennifer Screen; Belinda Snell; Laura Summerton; Penny Taylor	Russia; Svetlana Abrosimova; Becky Hammon; Marina Karpunina; Ilona Korstin; Marina Kuzina; Yekaterina Lisina; Irina Osipova; Oxana Rakhmatulina; Tatiana Shchegoleva; Irina Sokolovskaya; Maria Stepanova; Natalia Vodopyanova

== Boxing ==
Event	Gold	Silver	Bronze
Light flyweight	Zou Shiming; China	Pürevdorjiin Serdamba; Mongolia	Paddy Barnes; Ireland
Light flyweight	Zou Shiming; China	Pürevdorjiin Serdamba; Mongolia	Yampier Hernández; Cuba
Flyweight	Somjit Jongjohor; Thailand	Andry Laffita; Cuba	Georgy Balakshin; Russia
Flyweight	Somjit Jongjohor; Thailand	Andry Laffita; Cuba	Vincenzo Picardi; Italy
Bantamweight	Enkhbatyn Badar-Uugan; Mongolia	Yankiel León; Cuba	Bruno Julie; Mauritius
Bantamweight	Enkhbatyn Badar-Uugan; Mongolia	Yankiel León; Cuba	Veaceslav Gojan; Moldova
Featherweight	Vasyl Lomachenko; Ukraine	Khedafi Djelkhir; France	Yakup Kılıç; Turkey
Featherweight	Vasyl Lomachenko; Ukraine	Khedafi Djelkhir; France	Shahin Imranov; Azerbaijan
Lightweight	Aleksei Tishchenko; Russia	Daouda Sow; France	Hrachik Javakhyan; Armenia
Lightweight	Aleksei Tishchenko; Russia	Daouda Sow; France	Yordenis Ugás; Cuba
Light welterweight	Manuel Félix Díaz; Dominican Republic	Manus Boonjumnong; Thailand	Roniel Iglesias; Cuba
Light welterweight	Manuel Félix Díaz; Dominican Republic	Manus Boonjumnong; Thailand	Alexis Vastine; France
Welterweight	Bakhyt Sarsekbayev; Kazakhstan	Carlos Banteaux; Cuba	Hanati Silamu; China
Welterweight	Bakhyt Sarsekbayev; Kazakhstan	Carlos Banteaux; Cuba	Kim Jung-Joo; South Korea
Middleweight	James DeGale; Great Britain	Emilio Correa; Cuba	Darren Sutherland; Ireland
Middleweight	James DeGale; Great Britain	Emilio Correa; Cuba	Vijender Singh; India
Light heavyweight	Zhang Xiaoping; China	Kenny Egan; Ireland	Tony Jeffries; Great Britain
Light heavyweight	Zhang Xiaoping; China	Kenny Egan; Ireland	Yerkebulan Shynaliyev; Kazakhstan
Heavyweight	Rakhim Chakkhiev; Russia	Clemente Russo; Italy	Osmay Acosta; Cuba
Heavyweight	Rakhim Chakkhiev; Russia	Clemente Russo; Italy	Deontay Wilder; United States
Super heavyweight	Roberto Cammarelle; Italy	Zhang Zhilei; China	Vyacheslav Glazkov; Ukraine
Super heavyweight	Roberto Cammarelle; Italy	Zhang Zhilei; China	David Price; Great Britain

== Canoeing ==
=== Flatwater ===
Event	Gold	Silver	Bronze
Men's C-1 500 m	Maxim Opalev; Russia	David Cal; Spain	Yuriy Cheban; Ukraine
Men's C-1 1000 m	Attila Vajda; Hungary	David Cal; Spain	Thomas Hall; Canada
Men's C-2 500 m	China; Meng Guanliang; Yang Wenjun	Russia; Sergey Ulegin; Aleksandr Kostoglod	Germany; Christian Gille; Tomasz Wylenzek
Men's C-2 1000 m	Belarus; Andrei Bahdanovich; Aliaksandr Bahdanovich	Germany; Christian Gille; Tomasz Wylenzek	Hungary; György Kozmann; Tamás Kiss
Men's K-1 500 m	Ken Wallace; Australia	Adam van Koeverden; Canada	Tim Brabants; Great Britain
Men's K-1 1000 m	Tim Brabants; Great Britain	Eirik Verås Larsen; Norway	Ken Wallace; Australia
Men's K-2 500 m	Spain; Saúl Craviotto; Carlos Pérez	Germany; Ronald Rauhe; Tim Wieskötter	Belarus; Raman Piatrushenka; Vadzim Makhneu
Men's K-2 1000 m	Germany; Martin Hollstein; Andreas Ihle	Denmark; Kim Wraae Knudsen; René Holten Poulsen	Italy; Andrea Facchin; Antonio Scaduto
Men's K-4 1000 m	Belarus; Raman Piatrushenka; Aliaksei Abalmasau; Artur Litvinchuk; Vadzim Makhneu	Slovakia; Richard Riszdorfer; Michal Riszdorfer; Erik Vlček; Juraj Tarr	Germany; Lutz Altepost; Norman Bröckl; Torsten Eckbrett; Björn Goldschmidt
Women's K-1 500 m	Inna Osypenko-Radomska; Ukraine	Josefa Idem; Italy	Katrin Wagner-Augustin; Germany
Women's K-2 500 m	Hungary; Katalin Kovács; Natasa Janics	Poland; Beata Mikołajczyk; Aneta Konieczna	France; Marie Delattre; Anne-Laure Viard
Women's K-4 500 m	Germany; Fanny Fischer; Nicole Reinhardt; Katrin Wagner-Augustin; Conny Waßmuth	Hungary; Katalin Kovács; Gabriella Szabó; Danuta Kozák; Natasa Janics	Australia; Lisa Oldenhof; Hannah Davis; Chantal Meek; Lyndsie Fogarty

=== Slalom ===
Event	Gold	Silver	Bronze
Men's slalom C-1	Michal Martikán; Slovakia	David Florence; Great Britain	Robin Bell; Australia
Men's slalom C-2	Slovakia; Peter Hochschorner; Pavol Hochschorner	Czech Republic; Jaroslav Volf; Ondřej Štěpánek	Russia; Mikhail Kuznetsov; Dmitry Larionov
Men's slalom K-1	Alexander Grimm; Germany	Fabien Lefèvre; France	Benjamin Boukpeti; Togo
Women's slalom K-1	Elena Kaliská; Slovakia	Jacqueline Lawrence; Australia	Violetta Oblinger-Peters; Austria

== Cycling ==
=== Road ===
Event	Gold	Silver	Bronze
Men's road race	Samuel Sánchez; Spain	Fabian Cancellara ^{[G]} Switzerland	Alexandr Kolobnev ^{[G]} Russia
Men's time trial	Fabian Cancellara; Switzerland	Gustav Larsson; Sweden	Levi Leipheimer; United States
Women's road race	Nicole Cooke; Great Britain	Emma Johansson; Sweden	Tatiana Guderzo; Italy
Women's time trial	Kristin Armstrong; United States	Emma Pooley; Great Britain	Karin Thürig; Switzerland

=== Track ===
Event	Gold	Silver	Bronze
Men's Keirin	Chris Hoy; Great Britain	Ross Edgar; Great Britain	Kiyofumi Nagai; Japan
Men's Madison	Argentina; Juan Curuchet; Walter Pérez	Spain; Joan Llaneras; Antonio Tauler	Russia; Mikhail Ignatiev; Alexei Markov
Men's points race	Joan Llaneras; Spain	Roger Kluge; Germany	Chris Newton; Great Britain
Men's individual pursuit	Bradley Wiggins; Great Britain	Hayden Roulston; New Zealand	Steven Burke; Great Britain
Men's team pursuit	Great Britain; Ed Clancy; Paul Manning; Geraint Thomas; Bradley Wiggins	Denmark; Casper Jørgensen; Jens-Erik Madsen; Michael Mørkøv; Alex Rasmussen; Michael Færk Christensen	New Zealand; Sam Bewley; Hayden Roulston; Marc Ryan; Jesse Sergent; Westley Gough
Men's sprint	Chris Hoy; Great Britain	Jason Kenny; Great Britain	Mickaël Bourgain; France
Men's team sprint	Great Britain; Chris Hoy; Jason Kenny; Jamie Staff	France; Grégory Baugé; Kévin Sireau; Arnaud Tournant	Germany; René Enders; Maximilian Levy; Stefan Nimke
Women's points race	Marianne Vos; Netherlands	Yoanka González; Cuba	Leire Olaberria; Spain
Women's pursuit	Rebecca Romero; Great Britain	Wendy Houvenaghel; Great Britain	Lesya Kalytovska; Ukraine
Women's sprint	Victoria Pendleton; Great Britain	Anna Meares; Australia	Guo Shuang; China

=== Mountain bike ===
Event	Gold	Silver	Bronze
Men's cross-country	Julien Absalon; France	Jean-Christophe Péraud; France	Nino Schurter; Switzerland
Women's cross-country	Sabine Spitz; Germany	Maja Włoszczowska; Poland	Irina Kalentieva; Russia

=== BMX ===
Event	Gold	Silver	Bronze
Men's BMX	Māris Štrombergs; Latvia	Mike Day; United States	Donny Robinson; United States
Women's BMX	Anne-Caroline Chausson; France	Laëtitia Le Corguillé; France	Jill Kintner; United States

== Diving ==
Event	Gold	Silver	Bronze
Men's 3 m springboard	He Chong; China	Alexandre Despatie; Canada	Qin Kai; China
Women's 3 m springboard	Guo Jingjing; China	Yuliya Pakhalina; Russia	Wu Minxia; China
Men's 10 m platform	Matthew Mitcham; Australia	Zhou Lüxin; China	Gleb Galperin; Russia
Women's 10 m platform	Chen Ruolin; China	Émilie Heymans; Canada	Wang Xin; China
Men's synchronized 3 m springboard	China; Qin Kai; Wang Feng	Russia; Dmitri Sautin; Yuriy Kunakov	Ukraine; Illya Kvasha; Oleksiy Prygorov
Women's synchronized 3 m springboard	China; Guo Jingjing; Wu Minxia	Russia; Yuliya Pakhalina; Anastasia Pozdniakova	Germany; Ditte Kotzian; Heike Fischer
Men's synchronized 10 m platform	China; Lin Yue; Huo Liang	Germany; Patrick Hausding; Sascha Klein	Russia; Gleb Galperin; Dmitriy Dobroskok
Women's synchronized 10 m platform	China; Wang Xin; Chen Ruolin	Australia; Briony Cole; Melissa Wu	Mexico; Paola Espinosa; Tatiana Ortiz

== Equestrian ==
Event	Gold	Silver	Bronze
Individual dressage	Anky van Grunsven; Netherlands	Isabell Werth; Germany	Heike Kemmer; Germany
Team dressage	Germany; Nadine Capellmann; Heike Kemmer; Isabell Werth	Netherlands; Anky van Grunsven; Hans Peter Minderhoud; Imke Schellekens	Denmark; Andreas Helgstrand; Anne van Olst; Nathalie zu Sayn Wittgenstein
Individual eventing	Hinrich Romeike; Germany	Gina Miles; United States	Kristina Cook; Great Britain
Team eventing	Germany; Andreas Dibowski; Ingrid Klimke; Frank Ostholt; Hinrich Romeike; Peter Thomsen	Australia; Clayton Fredericks; Lucinda Fredericks; Sonja Johnson; Megan Jones; Shane Rose	Great Britain; Kristina Cook; Daisy Dick; William Fox-Pitt; Sharon Hunt; Mary King
Individual jumping	Eric Lamaze; Canada	Rolf-Göran Bengtsson; Sweden	Beezie Madden; United States
Team jumping	United States; Laura Kraut; Beezie Madden; Will Simpson; McLain Ward	Canada; Mac Cone; Jill Henselwood; Eric Lamaze; Ian Millar	Switzerland ^{[C]} Christina Liebherr; Pius Schwizer; Niklaus Schurtenberger; Steve Guerdat

== Fencing ==
Event	Gold	Silver	Bronze
Men's épée	Matteo Tagliariol; Italy	Fabrice Jeannet; France	José Luis Abajo; Spain
Men's team épée	France; Jérôme Jeannet; Fabrice Jeannet; Ulrich Robeiri	Poland; Robert Andrzejuk; Tomasz Motyka; Adam Wiercioch; Radosław Zawrotniak	Italy; Stefano Carozzo; Diego Confalonieri; Alfredo Rota; Matteo Tagliariol
Women's épée	Britta Heidemann; Germany	Ana Maria Brânză; Romania	Ildikó Mincza-Nébald; Hungary
Men's foil	Benjamin Kleibrink; Germany	Yuki Ota; Japan	Salvatore Sanzo; Italy
Women's foil	Valentina Vezzali; Italy	Nam Hyun-Hee; South Korea	Margherita Granbassi; Italy
Women's team foil	Russia; Svetlana Boyko; Aida Chanayeva; Viktoria Nikishina; Yevgeniya Lamonova	United States; Emily Cross; Hanna Thompson; Erinn Smart	Italy; Valentina Vezzali; Giovanna Trillini; Margherita Granbassi; Ilaria Salvatori
Men's sabre	Zhong Man; China	Nicolas Lopez; France	Mihai Covaliu; Romania
Men's team sabre	France; Nicolas Lopez; Julien Pillet; Boris Sanson	United States; Tim Morehouse; Jason Rogers; Keeth Smart; James Williams	Italy; Aldo Montano; Diego Occhiuzzi; Giampiero Pastore; Luigi Tarantino
Women's sabre	Mariel Zagunis; United States	Sada Jacobson; United States	Rebecca Ward; United States
Women's team sabre	Ukraine; Olga Kharlan; Olena Khomrova; Halyna Pundyk; Olha Zhovnir	China; Bao Yingying; Huang Haiyang; Ni Hong; Tan Xue	United States; Sada Jacobson; Rebecca Ward; Mariel Zagunis

== Field hockey ==
Event	Gold	Silver	Bronze
Men's team	Germany; Philip Witte; Maximilian Müller; Sebastian Biederlack; Carlos Nevado; Moritz Fürste; Jan-Marco Montag; Tobias Hauke; Tibor Weißenborn; Benjamin Weß; Niklas Meinert; Timo Weß; Oliver Korn; Christopher Zeller; Max Weinhold; Matthias Witthaus; Florian Keller; Philipp Zeller	Spain; Francisco Cortés; Santi Freixa; Francisco Fábregas; Víctor Sojo; Alex Fábregas; Pol Amat; Eduardo Tubau; Roc Oliva; Juan Fernández; Ramón Alegre; Xavier Ribas; Albert Sala; Rodrigo Garza; Sergi Enrique; Eduard Arbós; David Alegre	Australia; Jamie Dwyer; Liam de Young; Robert Hammond; Mark Knowles; Eddie Ockenden; David Guest; Luke Doerner; Grant Schubert; Bevan George; Andrew Smith; Stephen Lambert; Eli Matheson; Matthew Wells; Travis Brooks; Kiel Brown; Fergus Kavanagh; Des Abbott
Women's team	Netherlands; Lisanne de Roever; Eefke Mulder; Fatima Moreira de Melo; Miek van Geenhuizen; Wieke Dijkstra; Maartje Goderie; Lidewij Welten; Minke Smabers; Minke Booij; Janneke Schopman; Maartje Paumen; Naomi van As; Ellen Hoog; Sophie Polkamp; Eva de Goede; Marilyn Agliotti	China; Ma Yibo; Chen Zhaoxia; Cheng Hui; Huang Junxia; Fu Baorong; Li Shuang; Gao Lihua; Tang Chunling; Zhou Wanfeng; Zhang Yimeng; Li Hongxia; Ren Ye; Chen Qiuqi; Zhao Yudiao; Song Qingling; Pan Fengzhen	Argentina; Paola Vukojicic; Belén Succi; Magdalena Aicega; Mercedes Margalot; Mariana Rossi; Noel Barrionuevo; Giselle Kañevsky; Claudia Burkart; Luciana Aymar; Mariné Russo; Mariana González Oliva; Soledad García; Alejandra Gulla; María de la Paz Hernández; Carla Rebecchi; Rosario Luchetti

== Football ==
Event	Gold	Silver	Bronze
Men's team	Argentina; Óscar Ustari; Ezequiel Garay; Fabián Monzón; Pablo Zabaleta; Fernando Gago; Federico Fazio; José Sosa; Éver Banega; Ezequiel Lavezzi; Juan Román Riquelme; Ángel Di María; Nicolás Pareja; Lautaro Acosta; Javier Mascherano; Lionel Messi; Sergio Agüero; Diego Buonanotte; Sergio Romero; Nicolás Navarro	Nigeria; Ambruse Vanzekin; Chibuzor Okonkwo; Onyekachi Apam; Dele Adeleye; Monday James; Chinedu Obasi; Sani Kaita; Victor Obinna; Isaac Promise; Solomon Okoronkwo; Oluwafemi Ajilore; Olubayo Adefemi; Peter Odemwingie; Efe Ambrose; Victor Anichebe; Emmanuel Ekpo; Ikechukwu Ezenwa; Oladapo Olufemi	Brazil; Diego Alves; Renan; Rafinha; Alex Silva; Thiago Silva; Marcelo; Ilsinho; Breno; Hernanes; Anderson; Lucas; Ronaldinho; Ramires; Diego; Thiago Neves; Alexandre Pato; Rafael Sóbis; Jô
Women's team	United States; Hope Solo; Nicole Barnhart; Heather Mitts; Christie Rampone; Rachel Buehler; Stephanie Cox; Kate Markgraf; Lori Chalupny; Lindsay Tarpley; Shannon Boxx; Heather O'Reilly; Aly Wagner; Carli Lloyd; Tobin Heath; Angela Hucles; Natasha Kai; Amy Rodriguez; Lauren Cheney	Brazil; Andréia Suntaque; Bárbara Micheline do Monte Barbosa; Andréia Rosa de Andrade; Tânia Maria Pereira Ribeiro; Simone Gomes Jatobá; Rosana dos Santos Augusto; Érika Cristiano dos Santos; Renata Aparecida da Costa; Miraildes Maciel Mota; Daniela Alves Lima; Ester Aparecida dos Santos; Delma Gonçalves; Francielle Manoel Alberto; Andréia dos Santos; Maurine Dorneles Gonçalves; Marta Vieira da Silva; Cristiane Rozeira de Souza Silva; Fabiana da Silva Simões	Germany; Nadine Angerer; Fatmire Bajramaj; Saskia Bartusiak; Melanie Behringer; Linda Bresonik; Kerstin Garefrekes; Ariane Hingst; Ursula Holl; Annike Krahn; Simone Laudehr; Renate Lingor; Anja Mittag; Célia Okoyino da Mbabi; Babett Peter; Conny Pohlers; Birgit Prinz; Sandra Smisek; Kerstin Stegemann

== Gymnastics ==
=== Artistic ===
Event	Gold	Silver	Bronze
Men's individual all-around	Yang Wei; China	Kōhei Uchimura; Japan	Benoît Caranobe; France
Men's team all-around	China; Chen Yibing; Huang Xu; Li Xiaopeng; Xiao Qin; Yang Wei; Zou Kai	Japan; Takehiro Kashima; Takuya Nakase; Makoto Okiguchi; Koki Sakamoto; Hiroyuki Tomita; Kōhei Uchimura	United States; Alexander Artemev; Raj Bhavsar; Joseph Hagerty; Jonathan Horton; Justin Spring; Kevin Tan
Men's floor exercise	Zou Kai; China	Gervasio Deferr; Spain	Anton Golotsutskov; Russia
Men's horizontal bar	Zou Kai; China	Jonathan Horton; United States	Fabian Hambüchen; Germany
Men's parallel bars	Li Xiaopeng; China	Yoo Won-Chul; South Korea	Anton Fokin; Uzbekistan
Men's pommel horse	Xiao Qin; China	Filip Ude; Croatia	Louis Smith; Great Britain
Men's rings	Chen Yibing; China	Yang Wei; China	Oleksandr Vorobiov; Ukraine
Men's vault	Leszek Blanik; Poland	Thomas Bouhail; France	Anton Golotsutskov; Russia
Women's individual all-around	Nastia Liukin; United States	Shawn Johnson; United States	Yang Yilin; China
Women's team all-around	China; Cheng Fei; Deng Linlin; He Kexin; Jiang Yuyuan; Li Shanshan; Yang Yilin	United States; Shawn Johnson; Nastia Liukin; Chellsie Memmel; Samantha Peszek; Alicia Sacramone; Bridget Sloan	Romania; Andreea Acatrinei; Gabriela Drăgoi; Andreea Grigore; Sandra Izbaşa; Steliana Nistor; Anamaria Tămârjan
Women's balance beam	Shawn Johnson; United States	Nastia Liukin; United States	Cheng Fei; China
Women's floor exercise	Sandra Izbaşa; Romania	Shawn Johnson; United States	Nastia Liukin; United States
Women's uneven bars	He Kexin; China	Nastia Liukin; United States	Yang Yilin; China
Women's vault	Hong Un Jong; North Korea	Oksana Chusovitina; Germany	Cheng Fei; China

=== Rhythmic ===
Event	Gold	Silver	Bronze
individual all-around	Yevgeniya Kanayeva; Russia	Inna Zhukova; Belarus	Anna Bessonova; Ukraine
team all-around	Russia; Margarita Aliychuk; Anna Gavrilenko; Tatiana Gorbunova; Yelena Posevina; Daria Shkurikhina; Natalia Zuyeva	China; Cai Tongtong; Chou Tao; Lü Yuanyang; Sui Jian-Shuang; Sun Dan; Zhang Shuo	Belarus; Olesya Babushkina; Anastasia Ivankova; Ksenia Sankovich; Zinaida Lunina; Glafira Martinovich; Alina Tumilovich

=== Trampoline ===
Event	Gold	Silver	Bronze
Men's	Lu Chunlong; China	Jason Burnett; Canada	Dong Dong; China
Women's	He Wenna; China	Karen Cockburn; Canada	Ekaterina Khilko; Uzbekistan

== Handball ==
Event	Gold	Silver	Bronze
Men's team	France; Jérôme Fernandez; Didier Dinart; Cédric Burdet; Guillaume Gille; Bertrand Gille; Daniel Narcisse; Olivier Girault; Daouda Karaboué; Nikola Karabatić; Christophe Kempe; Thierry Omeyer; Joël Abati; Luc Abalo; Michaël Guigou; Cédric Paty	Iceland; Alexander Petersson; Arnór Atlason; Ásgeir Örn Hallgrímsson; Björgvin Páll Gústavsson; Guðjón Valur Sigurðsson; Hreiðar Guðmundsson; Ingimundur Ingimundarson; Logi Geirsson; Ólafur Stefánsson; Róbert Gunnarsson; Sigfús Sigurðsson; Snorri Guðjónsson; Sturla Ásgeirsson; Sverre Andreas Jakobsson	Spain; Albert Rocas; Alberto Entrerríos; Carlos Prieto; Cristian Malmagro; David Barrufet; David Davis; Demetrio Lozano; Iker Romero; Jon Belaustegui; José Javier Hombrados; Juanín García; Raúl Entrerríos; Rubén Garabaya; Víctor Tomás
Women's team	Norway; Kari Aalvik Grimsbø; Katja Nyberg; Ragnhild Aamodt; Gøril Snorroeggen; Else-Marthe Sørlie Lybekk; Tonje Nøstvold; Karoline Dyhre Breivang; Kristine Lunde; Gro Hammerseng; Kari Mette Johansen; Marit Malm Frafjord; Tonje Larsen; Katrine Lunde Haraldsen; Linn-Kristin Riegelhuth	Russia; Inna Suslina; Maria Sidorova; Yana Uskova; Yekaterina Marennikova; Emiliya Turey; Yelena Dmitriyeva; Anna Kareyeva; Lyudmila Postnova; Irina Bliznova; Yelena Polenova; Oxana Romenskaya; Natalia Shipilova; Yekaterina Andryushina; Irina Poltoratskaya	South Korea; Oh Yong-Ran; Kim On-a; Huh Soon-Young; Song Hai-Rim; Kim Nam-Sun; Kim Cha-Youn; Oh Seong-Ok; Hong Jeong-ho; Park Chung-Hee; Lee Min-Hee; An Jung-Hwa; Bae Min-Hee; Choi Im-jeong; Moon Pil-Hee

== Judo ==
Event	Gold	Silver	Bronze
Men's 60 kg	Choi Min-Ho; South Korea	Ludwig Paischer; Austria	Rishod Sobirov; Uzbekistan
Men's 60 kg	Choi Min-Ho; South Korea	Ludwig Paischer; Austria	Ruben Houkes; Netherlands
Men's 66 kg	Masato Uchishiba; Japan	Benjamin Darbelet; France	Yordanis Arencibia; Cuba
Men's 66 kg	Masato Uchishiba; Japan	Benjamin Darbelet; France	Pak Chol-Min; North Korea
Men's 73 kg	Elnur Mammadli; Azerbaijan	Wang Ki-Chun; South Korea	Rasul Boqiev; Tajikistan
Men's 73 kg	Elnur Mammadli; Azerbaijan	Wang Ki-Chun; South Korea	Leandro Guilheiro; Brazil
Men's 81 kg	Ole Bischof; Germany	Kim Jae-Bum; South Korea	Tiago Camilo; Brazil
Men's 81 kg	Ole Bischof; Germany	Kim Jae-Bum; South Korea	Roman Gontiuk; Ukraine
Men's 90 kg	Irakli Tsirekidze; Georgia	Amar Benikhlef; Algeria	Hesham Mesbah; Egypt
Men's 90 kg	Irakli Tsirekidze; Georgia	Amar Benikhlef; Algeria	Sergei Aschwanden; Switzerland
Men's 100 kg	Naidangiin Tüvshinbayar; Mongolia	Askhat Zhitkeyev; Kazakhstan	Movlud Miraliyev; Azerbaijan
Men's 100 kg	Naidangiin Tüvshinbayar; Mongolia	Askhat Zhitkeyev; Kazakhstan	Henk Grol; Netherlands
Men's +100 kg	Satoshi Ishii; Japan	Abdullo Tangriev; Uzbekistan	Oscar Braison; Cuba
Men's +100 kg	Satoshi Ishii; Japan	Abdullo Tangriev; Uzbekistan	Teddy Riner; France
Women's 48 kg	Alina Alexandra Dumitru; Romania	Yanet Bermoy; Cuba	Paula Pareto; Argentina
Women's 48 kg	Alina Alexandra Dumitru; Romania	Yanet Bermoy; Cuba	Ryoko Tani; Japan
Women's 52 kg	Xian Dongmei; China	An Kum-Ae; North Korea	Soraya Haddad; Algeria
Women's 52 kg	Xian Dongmei; China	An Kum-Ae; North Korea	Misato Nakamura; Japan
Women's 57 kg	Giulia Quintavalle; Italy	Deborah Gravenstijn; Netherlands	Xu Yan; China
Women's 57 kg	Giulia Quintavalle; Italy	Deborah Gravenstijn; Netherlands	Ketleyn Quadros; Brazil
Women's 63 kg	Ayumi Tanimoto; Japan	Lucie Décosse; France	Elisabeth Willeboordse; Netherlands
Women's 63 kg	Ayumi Tanimoto; Japan	Lucie Décosse; France	Won Ok-Im; North Korea
Women's 70 kg	Masae Ueno; Japan	Anaysi Hernández; Cuba	Ronda Rousey; United States
Women's 70 kg	Masae Ueno; Japan	Anaysi Hernández; Cuba	Edith Bosch; Netherlands
Women's 78 kg	Yang Xiuli; China	Yalennis Castillo; Cuba	Jeong Gyeong-Mi; South Korea
Women's 78 kg	Yang Xiuli; China	Yalennis Castillo; Cuba	Stéphanie Possamaï; France
Women's +78 kg	Tong Wen; China	Maki Tsukada; Japan	Lucija Polavder; Slovenia
Women's +78 kg	Tong Wen; China	Maki Tsukada; Japan	Idalys Ortiz; Cuba

== Modern pentathlon ==
Event	Gold	Silver	Bronze
Men's	Andrey Moiseyev; Russia	Edvinas Krungolcas; Lithuania	Andrejus Zadneprovskis; Lithuania
Women's	Lena Schöneborn; Germany	Heather Fell; Great Britain	Not Awarded

== Rowing ==
Event	Gold	Silver	Bronze
Men's single sculls	Olaf Tufte; Norway	Ondřej Synek; Czech Republic	Mahé Drysdale; New Zealand
Men's double sculls	Australia; David Crawshay; Scott Brennan	Estonia; Tõnu Endrekson; Jüri Jaanson	Great Britain; Matthew Wells; Stephen Rowbotham
Men's lightweight double sculls	Great Britain; Zac Purchase; Mark Hunter	Greece; Dimitrios Mougios; Vasileios Polymeros	Denmark; Mads Rasmussen; Rasmus Quist
Men's quadruple sculls	Poland; Konrad Wasielewski; Marek Kolbowicz; Michał Jeliński; Adam Korol	Italy; Luca Agamennoni; Simone Venier; Rossano Galtarossa; Simone Raineri	France; Jonathan Coeffic; Pierre-Jean Peltier; Julien Bahain; Cédric Berrest
Men's coxless pair	Australia; Drew Ginn; Duncan Free	Canada; David Calder; Scott Frandsen	New Zealand; Nathan Twaddle; George Bridgewater
Men's coxless four	Great Britain; Tom James; Steve Williams; Pete Reed; Andrew Triggs Hodge	Australia; Matt Ryan; James Marburg; Cameron McKenzie-McHarg; Francis Hegerty	France; Julien Desprès; Benjamin Rondeau; Germain Chardin; Dorian Mortelette
Men's lightweight coxless four	Denmark; Thomas Ebert; Morten Jørgensen; Eskild Ebbesen; Mads Andersen	Poland; Łukasz Pawłowski; Bartłomiej Pawełczak; Miłosz Bernatajtys; Paweł Rańda	Canada; Iain Brambell; Jon Beare; Mike Lewis; Liam Parsons
Men's eight	Canada; Kevin Light; Ben Rutledge; Andrew Byrnes; Jake Wetzel; Malcolm Howard; Dominic Seiterle; Adam Kreek; Kyle Hamilton; Brian Price	Great Britain; Alex Partridge; Tom Stallard; Tom Lucy; Richard Egington; Josh West; Alastair Heathcote; Matt Langridge; Colin Smith; Acer Nethercott	United States; Beau Hoopman; Matt Schnobrich; Micah Boyd; Wyatt Allen; Daniel Walsh; Steven Coppola; Josh Inman; Bryan Volpenhein; Marcus McElhenney
Women's single sculls	Rumyana Neykova; Bulgaria	Michelle Guerette; United States	Ekaterina Karsten; Belarus
Women's double sculls	New Zealand; Georgina Evers-Swindell; Caroline Evers-Swindell	Germany; Annekatrin Thiele; Christiane Huth	Great Britain; Elise Laverick; Anna Bebington
Women's lightweight double sculls	Netherlands; Kirsten van der Kolk; Marit van Eupen	Finland; Minna Nieminen; Sanna Stén	Canada; Tracy Cameron; Melanie Kok
Women's quadruple sculls	China; Tang Bin; Xi Aihua; Jin Ziwei; Zhang Yangyang	Great Britain; Annabel Vernon; Debbie Flood; Frances Houghton; Katherine Grainger	Germany; Britta Oppelt; Manuela Lutze; Kathrin Boron; Stephanie Schiller
Women's coxless pair	Romania; Georgeta Andrunache; Viorica Susanu	China; Wu You; Gao Yulan	Belarus; Yuliya Bichyk; Natallia Helakh
Women's eight	United States; Erin Cafaro; Lindsay Shoop; Anna Goodale; Elle Logan; Anna Cummins; Susan Francia; Caroline Lind; Caryn Davies; Mary Whipple	Netherlands; Femke Dekker; Marlies Smulders; Nienke Kingma; Roline Repelaer van Driel; Annemarieke van Rumpt; Helen Tanger; Sarah Siegelaar; Annemiek de Haan; Ester Workel	Romania; Constanța Burcică; Viorica Susanu; Rodica Şerban; Enikő Barabás; Simona Muşat; Ioana Papuc; Georgeta Andrunache; Doina Ignat; Elena Georgescu

== Sailing ==
Event	Gold	Silver	Bronze
Men's sailboard	Tom Ashley; New Zealand	Julien Bontemps; France	Shahar Tzuberi; Israel
Women's sailboard	Yin Jian; China	Alessandra Sensini; Italy	Bryony Shaw; Great Britain
Men's Laser	Paul Goodison; Great Britain	Vasilij Žbogar; Slovenia	Diego Romero; Italy
Women's Laser Radial	Anna Tunnicliffe; United States	Gintarė Volungevičiūtė; Lithuania	Xu Lijia; China
Men's 470	Australia; Nathan Wilmot; Malcolm Page	Great Britain; Nick Rogers; Joe Glanfield	France; Nicolas Charbonnier; Olivier Bausset
Women's 470	Australia; Elise Rechichi; Tessa Parkinson	Netherlands; Marcelien de Koning; Lobke Berkhout	Brazil; Fernanda Oliveira; Isabel Swan
49er	Denmark; Jonas Warrer; Martin Kirketerp	Spain; Iker Martínez de Lizarduy; Xabier Fernández	Germany; Jan-Peter Peckolt; Hannes Peckolt
Finn	Ben Ainslie; Great Britain	Zach Railey; United States	Guillaume Florent; France
Men's Star	Great Britain; Iain Percy; Andrew Simpson	Brazil; Robert Scheidt; Bruno Prada	Sweden; Fredrik Lööf; Anders Ekström
Tornado	Spain; Antón Paz Blanco; Fernando Echavarri	Australia; Darren Bundock; Glenn Ashby	Argentina; Santiago Lange; Carlos Espínola
Women's Yngling	Great Britain; Sarah Ayton; Sarah Webb; Pippa Wilson	Netherlands; Mandy Mulder; Annemieke Bes; Merel Witteveen	Greece; Sofia Bekatorou; Sofia Papadopoulou; Virginia Kravarioti

== Shooting ==
Event	Gold	Silver	Bronze
Men's 10 m air pistol	Pang Wei; China	Jin Jong-oh; South Korea	Jason Turner^{[D]} United States
Women's 10 m air pistol	Guo Wenjun; China	Natalia Paderina; Russia	Nino Salukvadze; Georgia
Men's 10 m air rifle	Abhinav Bindra; India	Zhu Qinan; China	Henri Häkkinen; Finland
Women's 10 m air rifle	Kateřina Emmons; Czech Republic	Lioubov Galkina; Russia	Snježana Pejčić; Croatia
Women's 25 m pistol	Chen Ying; China	Otryadyn Gündegmaa; Mongolia	Munkhbayar Dorjsuren; Germany
Men's 25 m rapid fire pistol	Oleksandr Petriv; Ukraine	Ralf Schumann; Germany	Christian Reitz; Germany
Men's 50 m pistol	Jin Jong-oh; South Korea	Tan Zongliang ^{[D]} China	Vladimir Isakov ^{[D]} Russia
Men's 50 m rifle three positions	Qiu Jian; China	Jury Sukhorukov; Ukraine	Rajmond Debevec; Slovenia
Women's 50 m rifle three positions	Du Li; China	Kateřina Emmons; Czech Republic	Eglis Yaima Cruz; Cuba
Men's 50 m rifle prone	Artur Ayvazyan; Ukraine	Matthew Emmons; United States	Warren Potent; Australia
Men's skeet	Vincent Hancock; United States	Tore Brovold; Norway	Anthony Terras; France
Women's skeet	Chiara Cainero; Italy	Kim Rhode; United States	Christine Brinker; Germany
Men's trap	David Kostelecký; Czech Republic	Giovanni Pellielo; Italy	Aleksei Alipov; Russia
Women's trap	Satu Mäkelä-Nummela; Finland	Zuzana Štefečeková; Slovakia	Corey Cogdell; United States
Men's double trap	Walton Eller; United States	Francesco D'Aniello; Italy	Hu Binyuan; China

== Softball ==
Event	Gold	Silver	Bronze
Women's team	Japan; Naho Emoto; Motoko Fujimoto; Megu Hirose; Emi Inui; Sachiko Ito; Ayumi Karino; Satoko Mabuchi; Yukiyo Mine; Masumi Mishina; Rei Nishiyama; Hiroko Sakai; Rie Sato; Mika Someya; Yukiko Ueno; Eri Yamada	United States; Monica Abbott; Stacey Nuveman; Crystl Bustos; Jennie Finch; Laura Berg; Lauren Lappin; Lovieanne Jung; Cat Osterman; Tairia Flowers; Andrea Duran; Jessica Mendoza; Victoria Galindo; Kelly Kretschman; Caitlin Lowe; Natasha Watley	Australia; Jodie Bowering; Kylie Cronk; Kelly Hardie; Tanya Harding; Sandy Lewis; Simmone Morrow; Tracey Mosley; Stacey Porter; Melanie Roche; Justine Smethurst; Danielle Stewart; Natalie Titcume; Natalie Ward; Belinda Wright; Kerry Wyborn

== Swimming ==
Event	Gold	Silver	Bronze
Men's 50 m freestyle	César Cielo Filho; Brazil	Amaury Leveaux; France	Alain Bernard; France
Women's 50 m freestyle	Britta Steffen; Germany	Dara Torres; United States	Cate Campbell; Australia
Men's 100 m freestyle	Alain Bernard; France	Eamon Sullivan; Australia	Jason Lezak; United States
Men's 100 m freestyle	Alain Bernard; France	Eamon Sullivan; Australia	César Cielo Filho; Brazil
Women's 100 m freestyle	Britta Steffen; Germany	Libby Trickett; Australia	Natalie Coughlin; United States
Men's 200 m freestyle	Michael Phelps; United States	Park Tae-hwan; South Korea	Peter Vanderkaay; United States
Women's 200 m freestyle	Federica Pellegrini; Italy	Sara Isakovič; Slovenia	Pang Jiaying; China
Men's 400 m freestyle	Park Tae-hwan; South Korea	Zhang Lin; China	Larsen Jensen; United States
Women's 400 m freestyle	Rebecca Adlington; Great Britain	Katie Hoff; United States	Joanne Jackson; Great Britain
Women's 800 m freestyle	Rebecca Adlington; Great Britain	Alessia Filippi; Italy	Lotte Friis; Denmark
Men's 1500 m freestyle	Oussama Mellouli; Tunisia	Grant Hackett; Australia	Ryan Cochrane; Canada
Men's 100 m backstroke	Aaron Peirsol; United States	Matt Grevers; United States	Hayden Stoeckel; Australia
Men's 100 m backstroke	Aaron Peirsol; United States	Matt Grevers; United States	Arkady Vyatchanin; Russia
Women's 100 m backstroke	Natalie Coughlin; United States	Kirsty Coventry; Zimbabwe	Margaret Hoelzer; United States
Men's 200 m backstroke	Ryan Lochte; United States	Aaron Peirsol; United States	Arkady Vyatchanin; Russia
Women's 200 m backstroke	Kirsty Coventry; Zimbabwe	Margaret Hoelzer; United States	Reiko Nakamura; Japan
Men's 100 m breaststroke	Kosuke Kitajima; Japan	Alexander Dale Oen; Norway	Hugues Duboscq; France
Women's 100 m breaststroke	Leisel Jones; Australia	Rebecca Soni; United States	Mirna Jukić; Austria
Men's 200 m breaststroke	Kosuke Kitajima; Japan	Brenton Rickard; Australia	Hugues Duboscq; France
Women's 200 m breaststroke	Rebecca Soni; United States	Leisel Jones; Australia	Sara Nordenstam; Norway
Men's 100 m butterfly	Michael Phelps; United States	Milorad Čavić; Serbia	Andrew Lauterstein; Australia
Women's 100 m butterfly	Libby Trickett; Australia	Christine Magnuson; United States	Jessicah Schipper; Australia
Men's 200 m butterfly	Michael Phelps; United States	László Cseh; Hungary	Takeshi Matsuda; Japan
Women's 200 m butterfly	Liu Zige; China	Jiao Liuyang; China	Jessicah Schipper; Australia
Men's 200 m individual medley	Michael Phelps; United States	László Cseh; Hungary	Ryan Lochte; United States
Women's 200 m individual medley	Stephanie Rice; Australia	Kirsty Coventry; Zimbabwe	Natalie Coughlin; United States
Men's 400 m individual medley	Michael Phelps; United States	László Cseh; Hungary	Ryan Lochte; United States
Women's 400 m individual medley	Stephanie Rice; Australia	Kirsty Coventry; Zimbabwe	Katie Hoff; United States
Men's 4 × 100 m freestyle relay	United States; Michael Phelps; Garrett Weber-Gale; Cullen Jones; Jason Lezak; Nathan Adrian; Ben Wildman-Tobriner; Matt Grevers	France; Amaury Leveaux; Fabien Gilot; Frédérick Bousquet; Alain Bernard; Grégory Mallet; Boris Steimetz	Australia; Eamon Sullivan; Andrew Lauterstein; Ashley Callus; Matt Targett; Leith Brodie; Patrick Murphy
Women's 4 × 100 m freestyle relay	Netherlands; Inge Dekker; Ranomi Kromowidjojo; Femke Heemskerk; Marleen Veldhuis; Hinkelien Schreuder; Manon van Rooijen	United States; Natalie Coughlin; Lacey Nymeyer; Kara Lynn Joyce; Dara Torres; Emily Silver; Julia Smit	Australia; Cate Campbell; Alice Mills; Melanie Schlanger; Libby Trickett; Shayne Reese
Men's 4 × 200 m freestyle relay	United States; Michael Phelps; Ryan Lochte; Ricky Berens; Peter Vanderkaay; Klete Keller; Erik Vendt; David Walters	Russia; Nikita Lobintsev; Yevgeny Lagunov; Danila Izotov; Alexander Sukhorukov; Mikhail Polischuk	Australia; Patrick Murphy; Grant Hackett; Grant Brits; Nic Ffrost; Kirk Palmer; Leith Brodie
Women's 4 × 200 m freestyle relay	Australia; Stephanie Rice; Bronte Barratt; Kylie Palmer; Linda Mackenzie; Felicity Galvez; Angie Bainbridge; Melanie Schlanger; Lara Davenport	China; Yang Yu; Zhu Qianwei; Tan Miao; Pang Jiaying; Tang Jingzhi	United States; Allison Schmitt; Natalie Coughlin; Caroline Burckle; Katie Hoff; Christine Marshall; Kim Vandenberg; Julia Smit
Men's 4 × 100 m medley relay	United States; Aaron Peirsol; Brendan Hansen; Michael Phelps; Jason Lezak; Matt Grevers; Mark Gangloff; Ian Crocker; Garrett Weber-Gale	Australia; Hayden Stoeckel; Brenton Rickard; Andrew Lauterstein; Eamon Sullivan; Ashley Delaney; Christian Sprenger; Adam Pine; Matt Targett	Japan; Junichi Miyashita; Kosuke Kitajima; Takuro Fujii; Hisayoshi Sato
Women's 4 × 100 m medley relay	Australia; Emily Seebohm; Leisel Jones; Jessicah Schipper; Libby Trickett; Tarnee White; Felicity Galvez; Shayne Reese	United States; Natalie Coughlin; Rebecca Soni; Christine Magnuson; Dara Torres; Margaret Hoelzer; Megan Jendrick; Elaine Breeden; Kara Lynn Joyce	China; Zhao Jing; Sun Ye; Zhou Yafei; Pang Jiaying; Xu Tianlongzi
Men's 10 km marathon	Maarten van der Weijden; Netherlands	David Davies; Great Britain	Thomas Lurz; Germany
Women's 10 km marathon	Larisa Ilchenko; Russia	Keri-Anne Payne; Great Britain	Cassandra Patten; Great Britain

== Synchronized swimming ==
Event	Gold	Silver	Bronze
duet	Russia; Anastasia Davydova; Anastasiya Yermakova	Spain; Andrea Fuentes; Gemma Mengual	Japan; Saho Harada; Emiko Suzuki
team	Russia; Anastasia Davydova; Anastasiya Yermakova; Mariya Gromova; Natalia Ishchenko; Elvira Khasyanova; Olga Kuzhela; Yelena Ovchinnikova; Anna Shorina; Svetlana Romashina	Spain; Alba María Cabello; Raquel Corral; Andrea Fuentes; Gemma Mengual; Thaïs Henríquez; Laura López; Gisela Morón; Irina Rodríguez; Paola Tirados	China; Gu Beibei; Huang Xuechen; Jiang Tingting; Jiang Wenwen; Liu Ou; Luo Xi; Sun Qiuting; Wang Na; Zhang Xiaohuan

== Table tennis ==
Event	Gold	Silver	Bronze
Men's singles	Ma Lin; China	Wang Hao; China	Wang Liqin; China
Women's singles	Zhang Yining; China	Wang Nan; China	Guo Yue; China
Men's team	China; Ma Lin; Wang Hao; Wang Liqin	Germany; Timo Boll; Dimitrij Ovtcharov; Christian Süß	South Korea; Oh Sang-Eun; Ryu Seung-Min; Yoon Jae-Young
Women's team	China; Guo Yue; Wang Nan; Zhang Yining	Singapore; Feng Tianwei; Li Jiawei; Wang Yuegu	South Korea; Dang Ye-Seo; Kim Kyung-Ah; Park Mi-Young

== Taekwondo ==
Event	Gold	Silver	Bronze
Men's 58 kg	Guillermo Pérez; Mexico	Gabriel Mercedes; Dominican Republic	Chu Mu-yen; Chinese Taipei
Men's 58 kg	Guillermo Pérez; Mexico	Gabriel Mercedes; Dominican Republic	Rohullah Nikpai; Afghanistan
Men's 68 kg	Son Tae-Jin; South Korea	Mark López; United States	Servet Tazegül; Turkey
Men's 68 kg	Son Tae-Jin; South Korea	Mark López; United States	Sung Yu-Chi; Chinese Taipei
Men's 80 kg	Hadi Saei; Iran	Mauro Sarmiento; Italy	Zhu Guo; China
Men's 80 kg	Hadi Saei; Iran	Mauro Sarmiento; Italy	Steven López; United States
Men's +80 kg	Cha Dong-Min; South Korea	Alexandros Nikolaidis; Greece	Chika Chukwumerije; Nigeria
Men's +80 kg	Cha Dong-Min; South Korea	Alexandros Nikolaidis; Greece	Arman Chilmanov; Kazakhstan
Women's 49 kg	Wu Jingyu; China	Buttree Puedpong; Thailand	Daynellis Montejo; Cuba
Women's 49 kg	Wu Jingyu; China	Buttree Puedpong; Thailand	Dalia Contreras; Venezuela
Women's 57 kg	Lim Su-Jeong; South Korea	Azize Tanrıkulu; Turkey	Diana López; United States
Women's 57 kg	Lim Su-Jeong; South Korea	Azize Tanrıkulu; Turkey	Martina Zubčić; Croatia
Women's 67 kg	Hwang Kyung-Seon; South Korea	Karine Sergerie; Canada	Gwladys Épangue; France
Women's 67 kg	Hwang Kyung-Seon; South Korea	Karine Sergerie; Canada	Sandra Šarić; Croatia
Women's +67 kg	María del Rosario Espinoza; Mexico	Nina Solheim; Norway	Sarah Stevenson; Great Britain
Women's +67 kg	María del Rosario Espinoza; Mexico	Nina Solheim; Norway	Natália Falavigna; Brazil

== Tennis ==
Event	Gold	Silver	Bronze
Men's singles	Rafael Nadal; Spain	Fernando González; Chile	Novak Djokovic; Serbia
Women's singles	Elena Dementieva; Russia	Dinara Safina; Russia	Vera Zvonareva; Russia
Men's doubles	Switzerland; Roger Federer; Stanislas Wawrinka	Sweden; Simon Aspelin; Thomas Johansson	United States; Bob Bryan; Mike Bryan
Women's doubles	United States; Serena Williams; Venus Williams	Spain; Anabel Medina Garrigues; Virginia Ruano Pascual	China; Yan Zi; Zheng Jie

== Triathlon ==
Event	Gold	Silver	Bronze
Men's	Jan Frodeno; Germany	Simon Whitfield; Canada	Bevan Docherty; New Zealand
Women's	Emma Snowsill; Australia	Vanessa Fernandes; Portugal	Emma Moffatt; Australia

== Volleyball ==
=== Beach ===
Event	Gold	Silver	Bronze
Men's	United States; Phil Dalhausser; Todd Rogers	Brazil; Márcio Araújo; Fabio Magalhães	Brazil; Ricardo Santos; Emanuel Rego
Women's	United States; Misty May-Treanor; Kerri Walsh	China; Tian Jia; Wang Jie	China; Xue Chen; Zhang Xi

=== Indoor ===
Event	Gold	Silver	Bronze
Men's team	United States; Lloy Ball; Sean Rooney; David Lee; Richard Lambourne; William Priddy; Ryan Millar; Riley Salmon; Tom Hoff; Clay Stanley; Kevin Hansen; Gabriel Gardner; Scott Touzinsky	Brazil; Bruno Rezende; Marcelo Elgarten; André Heller; Samuel Fuchs; Gilberto Godoy Filho; Murilo Endres; André Luiz da Silva Nascimento; Sérgio Dutra Santos; Anderson Rodrigues; Gustavo Endres; Rodrigo Santana; Dante Amaral	Russia; Aleksandr Korneev; Semyon Poltavskiy; Aleksandr Kosarev; Sergey Grankin; Sergey Tetyukhin; Vadim Khamuttskikh; Yury Berezhko; Aleksey Ostapenko; Alexander Volkov; Aleksey Verbov; Maxim Mikhaylov; Aleksey Kuleshov
Women's team	Brazil; Walewska Oliveira; Carolina Albuquerque; Marianne Steinbrecher; Paula Pequeno; Thaisa Menezes; Hélia Souza; Valeska Menezes; Fabiana Claudino; Welissa Gonzaga; Jaqueline Carvalho; Sheilla Castro; Fabiana de Oliveira	United States; Ogonna Nnamani; Danielle Scott-Arruda; Tayyiba Haneef-Park; Lindsey Berg; Stacy Sykora; Nicole Davis; Heather Bown; Jennifer Joines; Kim Glass; Robyn Ah Mow-Santos; Kim Willoughby; Logan Tom	China; Wang Yimei; Feng Kun; Yang Hao; Liu Yanan; Wei Qiuyue; Xu Yunli; Zhou Suhong; Zhao Ruirui; Xue Ming; Li Juan; Zhang Na; Ma Yunwen

== Water polo ==
Event	Gold	Silver	Bronze
Men's team	Hungary; Zoltán Szécsi; Tamás Varga; Norbert Madaras; Dénes Varga; Tamás Kásás; Norbert Hosnyánszky; Gergely Kiss; Tibor Benedek; Dániel Varga; Péter Biros; Gábor Kis; Tamás Molnár; István Gergely	United States; Merrill Moses; Brandon Brooks; Ryan Bailey; J. W. Krumpholz; Tony Azevedo; Adam Wright; Peter Varellas; Jesse Smith; Jeff Powers; Layne Beaubien; Peter Hudnut; Rick Merlo; Tim Hutten	Serbia; Denis Šefik; Andrija Prlainović; Živko Gocić; Vanja Udovičić; Dejan Savić; Duško Pijetlović; Nikola Rađen; Filip Filipović; Aleksandar Ćirić; Aleksandar Šapić; Vladimir Vujasinović; Branko Peković; Slobodan Soro
Women's team	Netherlands; Ilse van der Meijden; Yasemin Smit; Mieke Cabout; Biurakn Hakhverdian; Marieke van den Ham; Daniëlle de Bruijn; Iefke van Belkum; Noeki Klein; Gillian van den Berg; Alette Sijbring; Rianne Guichelaar; Simone Koot; Meike de Nooy	United States; Betsey Armstrong; Jaime Hipp; Moriah van Norman; Kami Craig; Brenda Villa; Heather Petri; Patty Cardenas; Brittany Hayes; Lauren Wenger; Natalie Golda; Alison Gregorka; Elsie Windes; Jessica Steffens	Australia; Gemma Beadsworth; Nikita Cuffe; Suzie Fraser; Taniele Gofers; Kate Gynther; Amy Hetzel; Bronwen Knox; Emma Knox; Alicia McCormack; Melissa Rippon; Rebecca Rippon; Mia Santoromito; Jenna Santoromito

== Weightlifting ==
Event	Gold	Silver	Bronze
Men's 56 kg	Long Qingquan; China	Hoàng Anh Tuấn; Vietnam	Eko Yuli Irawan; Indonesia
Men's 62 kg	Zhang Xiangxiang; China	Diego Salazar; Colombia	Triyatno; Indonesia
Men's 69 kg	Liao Hui; China	Vencelas Dabaya; France	Yordanis Borrero; Cuba
Men's 77 kg	Sa Jae-Hyouk; South Korea	Li Hongli; China	Gevorg Davtyan; Armenia
Men's 85 kg	Lu Yong; China	Tigran Martirosyan; Armenia	Jadier Valladares; Cuba
Men's 94 kg	Szymon Kołecki; Poland	Arsen Kasabiev; Georgia	Yoandry Hernández; Cuba
Men's 105 kg	Andrei Aramnau; Belarus	Dmitry Klokov; Russia	Marcin Dołęga; Poland
Men's +105 kg	Matthias Steiner; Germany	Evgeny Chigishev; Russia	Viktors Ščerbatihs; Latvia
Women's 48 kg	Chen Wei-ling; Chinese Taipei	Im Jyoung-hwa; South Korea	Pensiri Laosirikul; Thailand
Women's 53 kg	Prapawadee Jaroenrattanatarakoon; Thailand	Yoon Jin-Hee; South Korea	Raema Lisa Rumbewas; Indonesia
Women's 58 kg	Chen Yanqing; China	O Jong Ae; North Korea	Wandee Kameaim; Thailand
Women's 63 kg	Pak Hyon Suk; North Korea	Lu Ying-chi; Chinese Taipei	Christine Girard; Canada
Women's 69 kg	Oksana Slivenko; Russia	Leydi Solís; Colombia	Abeer Abdelrahman; Egypt
Women's 75 kg	Alla Vazhenina; Kazakhstan	Lydia Valentín; Spain	Damaris Aguirre; Mexico
Women's +75 kg	Jang Mi-Ran; South Korea	Ele Opeloge; Samoa	Mariam Usman; Nigeria

== Wrestling ==
=== Freestyle ===
Event	Gold	Silver	Bronze
Men's 55 kg	Henry Cejudo (USA)	Tomohiro Matsunaga (JPN)	Besik Kudukhov (RUS)
Men's 55 kg	Henry Cejudo (USA)	Tomohiro Matsunaga (JPN)	Radoslav Velikov (BUL)
Men's 60 kg	Mavlet Batirov (RUS)	Kenichi Yumoto (JPN)	Bazar Bazarguruev (KGZ)
Men's 60 kg	Mavlet Batirov (RUS)	Kenichi Yumoto (JPN)	Morad Mohammadi (IRI)
Men's 66 kg	Ramazan Şahin (TUR)	Andriy Stadnik (UKR)	Sushil Kumar (IND)
Men's 66 kg	Ramazan Şahin (TUR)	Andriy Stadnik (UKR)	Otar Tushishvili (GEO)
Men's 74 kg	Buvaisar Saitiev (RUS)	Murad Gaidarov (BLR)	Kiril Terziev (BUL)
Men's 74 kg	Buvaisar Saitiev (RUS)	Murad Gaidarov (BLR)	Gheorghiță Ștefan (ROU)
Men's 84 kg	Revaz Mindorashvili (GEO)	Yusup Abdusalomov (TJK)	Taras Danko (UKR)
Men's 84 kg	Revaz Mindorashvili (GEO)	Yusup Abdusalomov (TJK)	Georgy Ketoyev (RUS)
Men's 96 kg	Shirvani Muradov (RUS)	Giorgi Gogshelidze (GEO)	Khetag Gazyumov (AZE)
Men's 96 kg	Shirvani Muradov (RUS)	Giorgi Gogshelidze (GEO)	Michel Batista (CUB)
Men's 120 kg	Bakhtiyar Akhmedov (RUS)	David Musuľbes (SVK)	Marid Mutalimov (KAZ)
Men's 120 kg	Bakhtiyar Akhmedov (RUS)	David Musuľbes (SVK)	Disney Rodríguez (CUB)
Women's 48 kg	Carol Huynh (CAN)	Chiharu Icho (JPN)	Mariya Stadnik (AZE)
Women's 48 kg	Carol Huynh (CAN)	Chiharu Icho (JPN)	Iryna Merleni (UKR)
Women's 55 kg	Saori Yoshida (JPN)	Xu Li (CHN)	Tonya Verbeek (CAN)
Women's 55 kg	Saori Yoshida (JPN)	Xu Li (CHN)	Jackeline Rentería (COL)
Women's 63 kg	Kaori Icho (JPN)	Alena Kartashova (RUS)	Yelena Shalygina (KAZ)
Women's 63 kg	Kaori Icho (JPN)	Alena Kartashova (RUS)	Randi Miller (USA)
Women's 72 kg	Wang Jiao (CHN)	Stanka Zlateva (BUL)	Kyoko Hamaguchi (JPN)
Women's 72 kg	Wang Jiao (CHN)	Stanka Zlateva (BUL)	Agnieszka Wieszczek (POL)

=== Greco-Roman ===
Event	Gold	Silver	Bronze
Men's 55 kg	Nazyr Mankiev (RUS)	Rovshan Bayramov (AZE)	Park Eun-Chul (KOR)
Men's 55 kg	Nazyr Mankiev (RUS)	Rovshan Bayramov (AZE)	Roman Amoyan (ARM)
Men's 60 kg	Islambek Albiev (RUS)	Nurbakyt Tengizbayev (KAZ)	Ruslan Tyumenbayev (KGZ)
Men's 60 kg	Islambek Albiev (RUS)	Nurbakyt Tengizbayev (KAZ)	Sheng Jiang (CHN)
Men's 66 kg	Steeve Guenot (FRA)	Kanatbek Begaliev (KGZ)	Armen Vardanyan (UKR)
Men's 66 kg	Steeve Guenot (FRA)	Kanatbek Begaliev (KGZ)	Mikhail Siamionau (BLR)
Men's 74 kg	Manuchar Kvirkelia (GEO)	Chang Yongxiang (CHN)	Yavor Yanakiev (BUL)
Men's 74 kg	Manuchar Kvirkelia (GEO)	Chang Yongxiang (CHN)	Christophe Guenot (FRA)
Men's 84 kg	Andrea Minguzzi (ITA)	Zoltán Fodor (HUN)	Nazmi Avluca (TUR)
Men's 84 kg	Andrea Minguzzi (ITA)	Zoltán Fodor (HUN)	Vacant ^{[E]}
Men's 96 kg	Aslanbek Khushtov (RUS)	Mirko Englich (GER)	Adam Wheeler (USA)
Men's 96 kg	Aslanbek Khushtov (RUS)	Mirko Englich (GER)	Marek Švec (CZE)
Men's 120 kg	Mijaín López (CUB)	Mindaugas Mizgaitis (LTU)	Yury Patrikeyev (ARM)
Men's 120 kg	Mijaín López (CUB)	Mindaugas Mizgaitis (LTU)	Yannick Szczepaniak (FRA)

== Statistics ==
=== Medal leaders ===
Athletes that won at least three gold medals or at least four total medals are listed below.

Athlete	Nation	Sport	Gold	Silver	Bronze	Total
Michael Phelps	United States	Swimming	8	0	0	8
Chris Hoy	Great Britain	Cycling	3	0	0	3
Zou Kai	China	Gymnastics	3	0	0	3
Stephanie Rice	Australia	Swimming	3	0	0	3
Libby Trickett	Australia	Swimming	2	1	1	4
Ryan Lochte	United States	Swimming	2	0	2	4
Nastia Liukin	United States	Gymnastics	1	3	1	5
Kirsty Coventry	Zimbabwe	Swimming	1	3	0	4
Shawn Johnson	United States	Gymnastics	1	3	0	4
Natalie Coughlin	United States	Swimming	1	2	3	6

== Medal winner changes ==
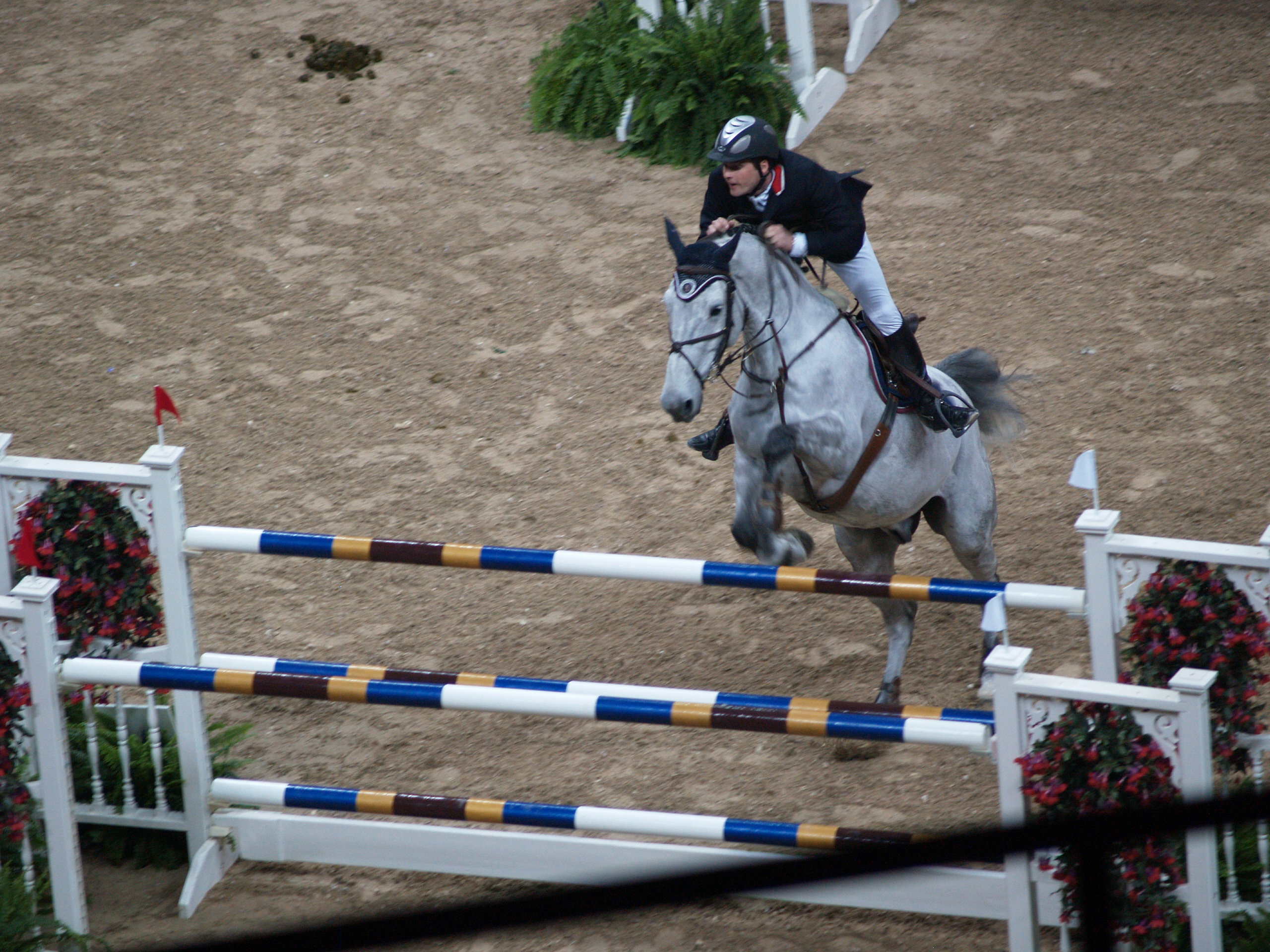
Tony André Hansen was stripped of his bronze medal when his horse tested positive for a banned substance

A. Belarusian athletes Vadim Devyatovskiy and Ivan Tsikhan, who won silver and bronze respectively in the men's hammer throw, both tested positive for abnormal levels of testosterone. After attending a disciplinary hearing in September, they were stripped of their medals on December 11, 2008. Krisztián Pars of Hungary was given the silver medal, and Koji Murofushi of Japan was given the bronze. On June 10, 2010, following a successful appeal to the Court of Arbitration for Sport, Devyatovskiy and Tsikhan had their medals reinstated.

B. Ukrainian athlete Lyudmyla Blonska, who finished second in the women's heptathlon, tested positive for the steroid methyltestosterone. On August 22, 2008, the International Olympic Committee officially stripped Blonska of her medal, and as a result, the silver medal went to Hyleas Fountain of the United States, and the bronze medal to Tatyana Chernova of Russia.

C. Norwegian equestrian athlete Tony André Hansen's horse tested positive for the pain relieving medication capsaicin, a banned substance. Hansen, who won a bronze medal in the team jumping event, was disqualified. In the team jumping system, the top three scores garnered by the four riders are counted. Hansen had the best score on his team, and it was removed from the total. Without Hansen's score, his team was below the bronze medal threshold so the medal was awarded to the team from Switzerland on December 22, 2008.

D. On August 15, 2008, the International Olympic Committee announced North Korean shooter Kim Jong-su had tested positive for the banned substance propranolol and was stripped of his two medals. He had won a bronze medal in the 10 metre air pistol and silver in the 50 metre pistol. After Kim Jong-su was disqualified, the bronze medal in the 10 metre air pistol went to Jason Turner of the United States; in the 50 metre pistol, the silver medal went to Tan Zongliang of China, and the bronze medal to Vladimir Isakov of Russia.

E. Swedish wrestler Ara Abrahamian was originally awarded a bronze medal in the Greco-Roman 84 kg event. However, at the medal ceremony, he walked off the podium and dropped his medal on the mat in protest of the judging in his event. On August 16, 2008, the International Olympic Committee decided to strip him of his medal because they felt it amounted to a political demonstration and was disrespectful to other athletes.

F. On November 18, 2009, the IOC announced that Rashid Ramzi of Bahrain had been stripped of the gold medal in the men's 1500 m race. Ramzi had been the first athlete from Bahrain to win an Olympic gold medal. His frozen blood sample was re-tested and found to contain traces of Continuous erythropoietin receptor activator (CERA), a stamina-building blood-booster. Kenyan Asbel Kipruto Kiprop was upgraded to gold, Nicholas Willis of New Zealand was given the silver and Mehdi Baala of France received the bronze.

G. On November 18, 2009, the IOC announced that Italian cyclist Davide Rebellin had tested positive for Cera and had been stripped of the silver medal he earned in the men's road race. Switzerland's Fabian Cancellara was upgraded to silver and Russia's Alexandr Kolobnev was given the bronze.

== Notes ==
Note 1. Although the official opening of the Games was on 8 August 2008, football matches were held beginning on 6 August.

Note 2. The fencing programme included six individual events and four team events, though the team events were a different set than were held in 2004. The International Fencing Federation's rules call for events not held in the previous Games to receive automatic selection and for at least one team event in each weapon to be held. Voting is conducted to determine the fourth event. In 2004, the three men's team events and the women's épée were held. Thus, in 2008, the women's foil and sabre events and men's épée were automatically selected. Men's sabre was chosen over foil by a 45–20 vote.

== See also ==
- 2008 Summer Olympics medal table
