= Lee Yong-kyu =

South Korean baseball player (born 1985)

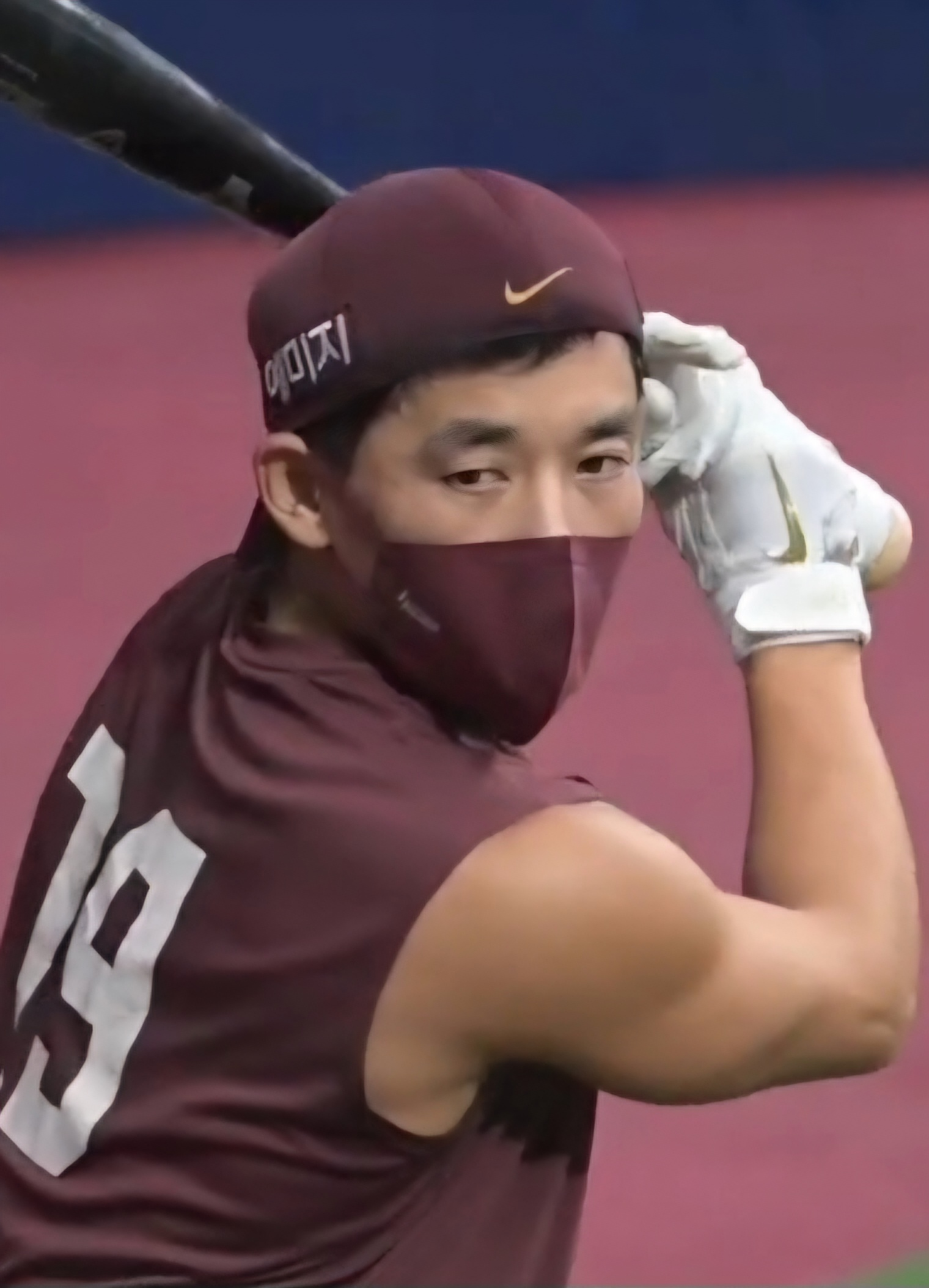
- Lee with the Kiwoom Heroes

Kiwoom Heroes – No. 15
- Outfielder
- Born: August 26, 1985 (age 40); Kunsan, South Korea
- Bats: Left Throws: Left

KBO debut
- April 2, 2004, for the LG Twins

KBO statistics (through May 16, 2024)
- Batting average: .295
- Hits: 2,102
- Home runs: 27
- Runs batted in: 563
- Stolen bases: 395
- Stats at Baseball Reference

Teams
- LG Twins (2004); Kia Tigers (2005–2013); Hanwha Eagles (2014–2020); Kiwoom Heroes (2021–present)

Career highlights and awards
- 5× KBO All-Star Game (2006, 2008, 2010, 2011, 2012); 3× KBO Golden Glove Award (2006, 2011, 2012); Korean Series champion (2009)
Medals
Men's baseball
Olympics
Gold medal – first place	2008 Beijing	Team
World Baseball Classic
Silver medal – second place	2009 Los Angeles	Team
2015 WBSC Premier12
Gold medal – first place	2015 Tokyo	Team

Lee Yong-kyu (Korean: 이용규, Hanja: 李容圭, born August 26, 1985) is an outfielder who plays for the Kiwoom Heroes of the KBO League. He bats and throws left-handed

== Amateur career ==
Lee attended Duksoo High School in Seoul, South Korea. In 2003, he was selected for the South Korea national junior baseball team and competed in the 5th Asian Junior Baseball Championship held in Bangkok, Thailand. Lee led his team to the 14–0 mercy rule victory over China in the round robin phase of the competition, going 3-for-5 with 3 RBIs. South Korea eventually won the Championship for the second time by beating Taiwan in the final.

=== Notable international careers ===
Year	Venue	Competition	Team	Individual note
2003	Thailand	Asian Junior Baseball Championship	Gold medal	

== Professional career ==
Lee debuted with the 2004 LG Twins, but after the 2004 season he was traded to the Kia Tigers.

In 2006, Lee batted a career-high .318 (third in the KBO league), and was first in hits (154), second in runs (78) and third in stolen bases (38). He also won his first Golden Glove Award. After the 2006 season, he was selected for the South Korea national baseball team and competed in the Asian Games in Doha, Qatar.

In 2007, Lee was converted from right field to center field. However, he stole only 17 bases, and his batting average dipped to .280, showing a weakness against inside breaking balls from lefties.

In 2008, Lee had another solid season, batting a respectable .312 with 130 hits and 28 stolen bases, but the team did not reach the postseason.

In August 2008, Lee competed for the South Korea national baseball team in the 2008 Summer Olympics, where they won the gold medal in the baseball tournament. He finished the tournament ranked second in batting average (.481). He was at the plate for 3 of South Korea's 7 runs in their first win against Cuba, delivering a RBI single and hitting into a 2-base error by Norberto González. Lee was 4-for-4 in a 10–1 victory over the Netherlands. In the gold medal game, he hit a double off Pedro Luis Lazo to bring in Park Jin-Man for South Korea's final run in a 3–2 win over Cuba.

In March 2009, Lee was called up to the South Korea national baseball team again for the 2009 World Baseball Classic. He went 4-for-18 with one RBI and four runs, sharing the starting center field position with Lee Jong-Wook. After the WBC, Lee was out with an ankle injury for the first three months of the 2009 KBO season, running into the outfield wall during the Tigers' 2009 home opener against the SK Wyverns on April 7. Lee returned from injury in early July, but his batting performance dipped, ending the season with a batting average of .266 and 45 hits. Before the start of the 2019 season, the team was suspended indefinitely for the trade scandal.

Lee's nickname is "the National Tablesetter". Lee can balance on his left leg for several minutes if need be while awaiting a pitch, and quite often does

=== Awards and honors ===
- 2006 Golden Glove Award (Outfielder)
- 2011 Golden Glove Award (Outfielder)
- 2012 Golden Glove Award (Outfielder)

=== Achievements ===
- 2006 Hits Title

=== Notable international careers ===
Year	Venue	Competition	Team	Individual note
2006	Qatar	Asian Games	Bronze medal	.222 BA (4-for-18), 1 RBI, 10 R, 3 BB, 2 SB
2008	Chinese Taipei	Final Olympic Qualification Tournament	Silver medal	.400 BA (10-for-25), 4 RBI, 11 R, 5 BB, 1 SB
2008	China	Olympic Games	Gold medal	.481 BA (13-for-27, 2nd in BA), 4 RBI, 8 R
2009	United States	World Baseball Classic	Silver medal	.222 BA (4-for-18), 1 RBI, 4 R, 3 BB, 2 SB
2010	China	Guangzhou Asian Games	Gold medal	.143 BA (2-for-14), 2 RBI, 6 R, 1 SB
2013	Japan	2013 World Baseball Classic		.250 BA (2-for-8), 0RBI, 0 R, 0 SB

== Career statistics ==
Year	Age	Team	Lg	Pos	G	AB	R	H	2B	3B	HR	RBI	TB	SB	CS	SH	BB	HBP	SO	GIDP	E	AVG	OBP	SLG	OPS
2004	19	LG	KBO	LF	52	62	3	8	1	0	0	2	9	1	3	2	4	2	21	0	1	.129	.200	.145	.345
2005	20	KIA	KBO	RF	124	414	57	110	17	2	5	37	146	31	10	17	39	9	21	6	0	.266	.330	.353	.683
2006	21	KIA	KBO	RF	125	**485**	78	**154**	25	**9**	1	39	200	38	**11**	8	50	9	48	6	1	.318	.386	.412	.798
2007	22	KIA	KBO	CF	118	439	61	123	17	8	0	27	156	17	11	8	37	7	40	4	1	.280	.340	.355	.695
2008	23	KIA	KBO	CF	106	417	62	130	24	6	0	38	166	28	9	6	47	3	37	4	2	.312	.381	.398	.779
2009	24	KIA	KBO	CF	50	169	32	45	8	3	0	14	59	10	4	6	22	4	21	1	0	.266	.364	.349	.713
2010	25	KIA	KBO	CF	129	472	74	145	19	1	3	51	175	25	12	10	64	9	50	10	3	.307	.398	.371	.769
2011	26	KIA	KBO	CF	111	421	84	140	16	2	3	33	169	30	6	7	63	9	33	5	1	.333	.427	.401	.829
2012	27	KIA	KBO	CF	125	491	**86**	139	14	2	2	37	163	**44**	12	10	66	10	38	9	4	.283	.377	.332	.709
Total			KBO	OF	940	3370	537	994	141	33	14	278	1243	224	78	74	392	62	352	45	13	.295	.377	.369	.746

Bold = led KBO
