= Song Seung-jun =

South Korean baseball player (born 1980)

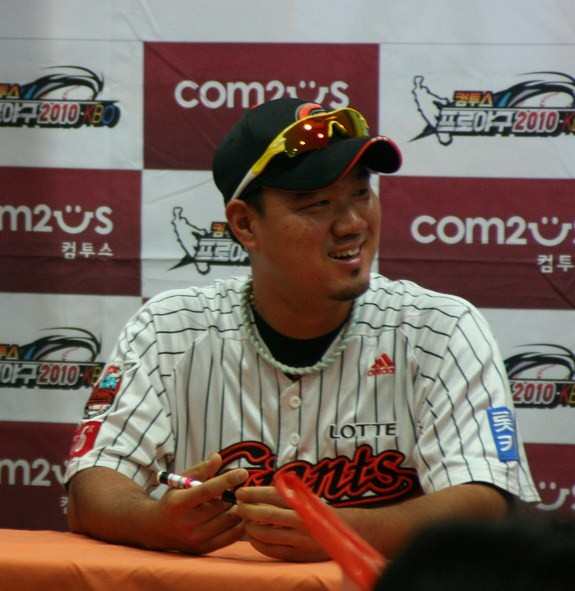
- Pitcher
- Born: June 29, 1980 (age 45); Pusan, South Korea
- Batted: Right Threw: Right

KBO debut
- April 21, 2007, for the Lotte Giants

Last KBO appearance
- September 8, 2020, for the Lotte Giants

KBO statistics
- Win–loss record: 109–85
- Earned run average: 4.48
- Strikeouts: 1,238
- Stats at Baseball Reference

Teams
- Lotte Giants (2007–2020)
Medals
Men's baseball
Representing South Korea
Men's baseball
Gold medal – first place	2008 Beijing	Team

Song Seung-jun (Korean: 송승준; Hanja: 宋勝準; born June 29, 1980 in Busan, South Korea) is a South Korean former professional baseball player. A pitcher, Song played for the Lotte Giants in the Korea Baseball Organization. Prior to playing for Lotte, Song played minor league baseball in the United States from 1999 through 2006. He bats and throws right-handed. Song's bread-and-butter pitch is a forkball.

== Amateur career ==
Song attended Kyungnam High School in Busan, South Korea. In September 1998, he was selected for the South Korean national junior team, and participated in the 3rd Asian Junior Baseball Championship in Osaka, Japan, along with Baek Cha-Seung, Lee Jong-Wook and Lee Jin-Young. He helped lead the baseball team to the Korean national high school championship in 1998.

=== Notable international careers ===
Year	Venue	Competition	Team	Individual note
1998	Japan	Asian Junior Baseball Championship	Bronze medal	

== Professional career ==
=== Minor League Baseball ===
Though Song was the first overall selection in the Korea Baseball Organization (KBO) amateur draft, Song signed with the Boston Red Sox of Major League Baseball as an amateur free agent in February 1999, receiving a $800,000 signing bonus. He started his professional career in the Rookie-level Gulf Coast League (GCL) with the GCL Red Sox that season. He pitched for the Lowell Spinners of the Class A-Short Season New York–Pennsylvania League in 2000.

In 2001, Song began the season with the Augusta GreenJackets of the Class A South Atlantic League (SAL), earning the victory in the SAL All-Star Game. He received a promotion to the Sarasota Red Sox of the Class A-Advanced Florida State League on his 21st birthday. He finished the season with a 1.90 earned run average, finishing second in minor league baseball behind Josh Beckett, and 135 strikeouts in 138 innings pitched. He was named Minor League Player of the Year by Baseball America. He also competed in the 2001 All-Star Futures Game as a member of World Team.

Prior to the 2002 season, Song was rated as the 60th-best prospect in baseball by Baseball America. In 2002, he played for the Trenton Thunder of the Class AA Eastern League, and competed in the 2002 All-Star Futures Game. That season, the Boston Red Sox traded Song to the Montreal Expos with Sun-Woo Kim for Cliff Floyd.

In April 2003, while pitching for the Harrisburg Senators, the Expos' Class AA affiliate in the Eastern League, Song threw a no-hitter. He was selected again as a member of World Team for the 2003 All-Star Futures Game. This made Song the first three-time participant in the All-Star Futures Game. Later that year, the Expos attempted to trade Song and Josh McKinley to the Texas Rangers for Juan González, but Gonzalez used a no-trade clause in his contract to block the deal. In 2004, the Expos optioned Song to the Edmonton Trappers of the Class AAA Pacific Coast League.

After the 2004 season, the Toronto Blue Jays claimed Song off of waivers. In 2005, he pitched for the San Francisco Giants organization. In 2006, he pitched for the Wichita Wranglers, the Kansas City Royals' Class AA affiliate, in the Texas League. He appeared in the Texas League All-Star Game.

=== KBO League ===
Song transferred to the Lotte Giants of the KBO, who signed him to one-year contract for $300,000 in March 2007. Song led the Giants in wins in 2010, and was selected to start the first game of the playoffs. Between 2008 and 2011, Song won at least 12 games a year for the Giants. In 2012, he was named a starter in the KBO All-Star Game, as the fans voted for ten Giants as starters.

In 2016, he grade down in 1st major in Lotte. Because of his Fascia rupture, his doctor said that he will need to cure of two weeks.

== International career ==
Song was named to the preliminary roster for the 2008 Beijing Olympic Games in July 2007, and made the final 24-man roster in July 2008, his first major international competition. Song started two games at the Olympics. On August 14, he pitched six scoreless innings against the Chinese national baseball team, giving up only two hits while striking out nine. On August 19, Song pitched 6 1/3 innings against Cuban national baseball team, allowing three runs and five hits to earn the win for South Korea.

=== Notable international careers ===
Year	Venue	Competition	Team	Individual note
2008	China	Olympic Games	Gold medal	1-0; 2.19 ERA (2 G, 12.1 IP, 3 ER, 12 K)

== Filmography ==
=== Television show ===
Year	Title	Role	Notes	Ref.
2022	Strongest Baseball	Cast Member		

== See also ==
- List of KBO career win leaders
- List of KBO career strikeout leaders
