= Yadier Pedroso =

Cuban baseball player (1986–2013)

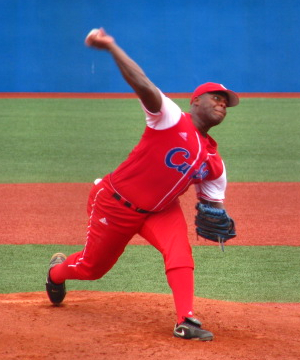
- Pedroso pitching for the Cuba national team in 2010 World University Baseball Championship
- Pitcher
- Born: 9 April 1986; Guanajay, La Habana Province, Cuba
- Died: 16 March 2013 (aged 26); Artemisa Province, Cuba
- Batted: Right Threw: Right

Teams
- La Habana (2004–2011); Artemisa (2011–2013)
Medals
Men's baseball
Representing Cuba
World Baseball Classic
Silver medal – second place	2006 San Diego	Team
Summer Olympics
Silver medal – second place	2008 Beijing	National team
Baseball World Cup
Gold medal – first place	2005 Rotterdam	National team
Silver medal – second place	2009 Nettuno	National team
Intercontinental Cup
Gold medal – first place	2010 Taichung	National team
Pan American Games
Bronze medal – third place	2011 Guadalajara	National team
Central American and Caribbean Games
Gold medal – first place	2006 Cartagena	National team

Yadier Pedroso González (9 April 1986 – 16 March 2013), was a right-handed professional baseball pitcher. He played for the Cuban national baseball team and La Habana of the Cuban National Series. Pedroso was part of the Cuban team at the 2006 and 2013 World Baseball Classics.

== Early life ==
Pedroso was born on 9 April 1986 in Guanajay, then part of La Habana Province (now Artemisa Province). His father, José Manuel, also played in the Cuban National Series and later worked as a pitching coach in both Cuba and Italy.

== Career ==
Pedroso, then 19 years old, went 8–5 with a 3.58 ERA for La Habana during the 2005–06 Cuban National Series as part of a strong staff featuring two other members of the national team, Jonder Martínez and Yulieski González.

== Death ==
On 16 March 2013, Pedroso died in a traffic accident near Artemisa, Cuba, at age 26. Before his death, he had expressed a desire to play for the Gallos de Sancti Spíritus under manager Yovany Aragón.
