= André Nascimento =

André Nascimento may refer to:

- André Nascimento (volleyball)
- André Nascimento (footballer)
