= Jeremy Cummings =

American baseball player (born 1976)

Personal information
- Full name: Jeremy Michael Cummings
- Born: November 7, 1976 (age 49) Charleston, West Virginia, U.S.
Medal record
Men's baseball
Representing United States
Olympic Games
| Bronze medal – third place | 2008 Beijing | Team |

Jeremy Michael Cummings (born November 7, 1976) is a minor league right-handed pitcher who last played in the Tampa Bay Rays organization in 2008. He was originally signed by the St. Louis Cardinals in 1999.

In his best minor league season he went a combined 12-4 record and 3.76 earned run average in 26 games (18 starts) between the Double-A Springfield Cardinals and Triple-A Memphis Redbirds.

The following season, he was signed as a minor league free agent by the Philadelphia Phillies, and assigned to their Triple-A affiliate, the Scranton/Wilkes-Barre Red Barons. In his final start of the season, he pitched a no hitter.

He split the 2007 season between the Rochester Red Wings and Syracuse SkyChiefs, the Minnesota Twins and Toronto Blue Jays' Triple-A affiliates respectively, before landing with the Rays in 2008. At the All Star break, Cummings was 7-2 with a 2.82 ERA to earn himself an International League All Star nod. He only appeared in three games in the second half of the season before shutting it down in order to compete with the United States national baseball team at the 2008 Summer Olympics in Beijing. He and his team won the Bronze medal.
