= Elier Sánchez =

Cuban baseball player

Medal record

Men's baseball

Representing Cuba

Olympic Games
Silver medal – second place	2008 Beijing	Team

Baseball World Cup
Silver medal – second place	2007 Taipei	Team

Pan American Games
Gold medal – first place	2007 Rio de Janeiro	Team

World Junior Baseball Championship
Gold medal – first place	2004 Taipei	Team

Elier Sánchez is a baseball player for Cuba. He was part of the Cuban team which won a silver medal at the 2008 Summer Olympics.
