= Eriel Sánchez =

Cuban baseball player (born 1975)

Gallos de Sancti Spíritus – No. 5
- Catcher / Manager
- Born: 17 May 1975 (age 51); Fomento, Sancti Spíritus Province, Cuba
- Bats: Right Throws: Right
Medals
Men's baseball
Representing Cuba
World Baseball Classic
Silver medal – second place	2006 San Diego	Team
Summer Olympics
Gold medal – first place	2004 Athens	Team
Silver medal – second place	2008 Beijing	Team
Baseball World Cup
Gold medal – first place	2003 Havana	Team
Silver medal – second place	2009 Nettuno	Team
Pan American Games
Gold medal – first place	2007 Rio de Janeiro	Team
Central American and Caribbean Games
Gold medal – first place	2006 Cartagena	Team

Eriel Sánchez León (born 17 May 1975) in (Fomento, Sancti Spiritus) is a Cuban baseball manager and former catcher for Sancti Spíritus of the Cuban National Series.

== Career ==
Sánchez was part of Cuba's gold medal-winning team at the 2004 Summer Olympics, silver medal winning team at the 2008 Summer Olympics and the second place team at the 2006 World Baseball Classic.
