= Baseball at the 2008 Summer Olympics =

Baseball at the Games of the XXIX Olympiad
- Pictogram used to identify baseball at the 2008 Games
- Venue: Wukesong Baseball Field
- Dates: August 13–23, 2008
- Teams: 8

Medalists
1st place, gold medalist(s)		South Korea
2nd place, silver medalist(s)		Cuba
3rd place, bronze medalist(s)		United States

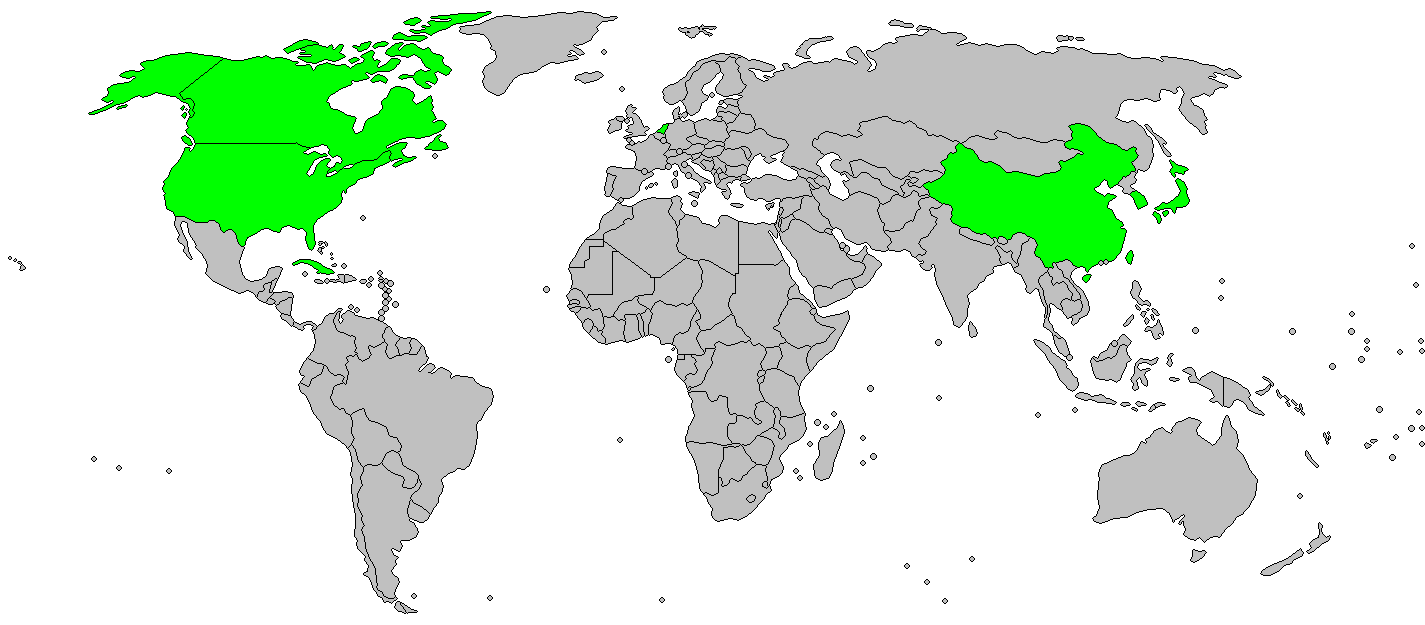
Competing teams

Baseball at the 2008 Summer Olympics in Beijing was held from August 13 to August 23. All games were played at Wukesong Baseball Field, a temporary venue constructed at the Beijing Wukesong Culture & Sports Center. For the third time in Olympic competition, professional baseball players were eligible to participate, though no active players from Major League Baseball were available.

This was the last Olympic baseball tournament before the International Olympic Committee voted to remove baseball from the program in the 2012 Olympics. Along with softball, baseball was rejected for inclusion in the 2016 Summer Olympics at the IOC's meeting in October 2009. However, following a 2016 IOC vote, baseball was again included for the 2020 Games.

This was also the first time that the IBAF's new extra-innings rule was officially in effect, allowing each team to start with two base runners from the 11th inning on. South Korea won the gold medal in a 3–2 final victory against Cuba. The United States won bronze.

== Venues ==
(China) Beijing
Wukesong Baseball Main Field	Wukesong Baseball Field 2
Capacity: 12,000	Capacity: 3,000

== Medalists ==
Gold	Silver	Bronze
South Korea; Hyun-Jin Ryu; Ki-Joo Han; Jin-Man Park; Hyuk Kwon; Taek-Keun Lee; Dae-Ho Lee; Seung-Hwan Oh; Jung-Keun Bong; Young-Min Ko; Jong-Wook Lee; Keun-Woo Jeong; Min-Jae Kim; Kab-Yong Jin; Jin-Young Lee; Won-Sam Jang; Seung-Jun Song; Kwang-Hyun Kim; Yong-Kyu Lee; Dong-Joo Kim; Min-Ho Kang; Hyun-soo Kim; Seung-Yeop Lee; Tae-Hyon Chong; Suk-Min Yoon	Cuba; Ariel Pestano; Yoandry Urgellés; Alfredo Despaigne; Luis Rodríguez; Alexei Bell; Yadier Pedroso; Jonder Martínez; Adiel Palma; Luis Navas; Giorvis Duvergel; Alexander Mayeta; Eriel Sánchez; Rolando Meriño; Héctor Olivera; Michel Enríquez; Yuliesky Gourriel; Vicyohandry Odelín; Pedro Luis Lazo; Eduardo Paret; Norberto González; Norge Luis Vera; Frederich Cepeda; Elier Sánchez; Miguel La Hera	United States; Brett Anderson; Blaine Neal; Matt Brown; Nate Schierholtz; Jeremy Cummings; Michael Koplove; Terry Tiffee; Kevin Jepsen; Brian Duensing; Dexter Fowler; Brandon Knight; Mike Hessman; Casey Weathers; Jason Donald; Jayson Nix; Taylor Teagarden; Stephen Strasburg; Jake Arrieta; Lou Marson; Matt LaPorta; Trevor Cahill; Brian Barden; John Gall; Jeff Stevens

== Competition format ==
Eight teams are competing in the Olympic baseball tournament, and the competition consists of two rounds. The preliminary round follows a round robin format, where each of the teams plays all the other teams once. Following this, the top four teams advance to a single elimination round culminating in the bronze and gold medal games.

== Qualification ==
Event	Date	Location	Vacancies	Qualified
Host nation				China
American Qualifying Tournament	Aug 25 – Sept 7, 2006	(Cuba) Havana	2	United States; Cuba
European Championship	Sept 7 – Sept 16, 2007	(Spain) Barcelona	1	Netherlands
Asian Baseball Championship	Nov 27 – Dec 3, 2007	(Taiwan) Taichung	1	Japan
Final Qualifying Tournament	Mar 7 – Mar 14, 2008	(Taiwan) Taichung and Douliou	3	Canada; South Korea; Chinese Taipei
TOTAL			8	

^1 Chinese Taipei is the official IOC designation for the state officially referred to as the Republic of China (ROC), commonly known as Taiwan.

== Team squad ==
Team	Qualification criteria	Appearance
Canada	1st place of Final Qualifying Tournament	2nd
China	Automatic as host nation of the Olympics	1st
Chinese Taipei	3rd place of Final Qualifying Tournament	3rd
Cuba	2nd place of American Qualifying Tournament	5th
Japan	1st place of Asian Baseball Championship	5th
South Korea	2nd place of Final Qualifying Tournament	3rd
Netherlands	1st place of European Championship	4th
United States	1st place of American Qualifying Tournament	4th

== Group stage ==
All times are China Standard Time (UTC+8)

Pos	Team	Pld	W	L	RF	RA	RD	PCT	GB	Qualification
1	South Korea	7	7	0	41	22	+19	1.000	—	Advance to knockout round
2	Cuba	7	6	1	52	23	+29	.857	1	Advance to knockout round
3	United States	7	5	2	40	22	+18	.714	2	Advance to knockout round
4	Japan	7	4	3	30	14	+16	.571	3	Advance to knockout round
5	Chinese Taipei	7	2	5	29	33	−4	.286 (Note: Chinese Taipei defeated Canada 6–5.)	5	
6	Canada	7	2	5	29	20	+9	.286	5	
7	Netherlands	7	1	6	9	50	−41	.143 (Note: Netherlands defeated China 6–4.)	6	
8	China (H)	7	1	6	14	60	−46	.143	6	

(H) Hosts
Notes:

Team	G	W	L	RS	RA	WIN%	GB	Tiebreaker
South Korea	7	7	0	41	22	1.000	–	–
Cuba	7	6	1	52	23	.857	1	–
United States	7	5	2	40	22	.714	2	–
Japan	7	4	3	30	14	.571	3	–
Chinese Taipei	7	2	5	29	33	.286	5	1–0
Canada	7	2	5	29	20	.286	5	0–1
Netherlands	7	1	6	9	50	.143	6	1–0
China	7	1	6	14	60	.143	6	0–1

=== August 13 ===
Team	1	2	3	4	5	6	7	8	9	R	H	E
Netherlands	0	0	0	0	0	0	0	0	0	0	4	1
Chinese Taipei	0	1	0	3	0	1	0	0	X	5	7	0
WP: Wei-Yin Chen (1-0) LP: David Bergman (0-1)

Team	1	2	3	4	5	6	7	8	9	R	H	E
Canada	0	0	0	3	2	0	1	4	-	10	10	0
China	0	0	0	0	0	0	0	0	-	0	8	2
WP: Chris Begg (1-0) LP: Tao Bu (0-1); Home runs: CAN: Scott Thorman (1), Michael Saunders (1); CHN: None

Team	1	2	3	4	5	6	7	8	9	R	H	E
United States	1	0	0	0	2	1	0	0	3	7	12	1
South Korea	0	2	1	0	3	0	0	0	2	8	9	1
WP: Suk-Min Yoon (1-0) LP: Jeff Stevens (0-1); Home runs: USA: Nate Schierholtz (1), Mike Hessman (1); KOR: Dae-Ho Lee (1)

Team	1	2	3	4	5	6	7	8	9	R	H	E
Japan	0	0	1	0	1	0	0	0	0	2	9	1
Cuba	0	1	1	0	2	0	0	0	X	4	9	1
WP: Norge Luis Vera (1-0) LP: Yu Darvish (0-1) Sv: Pedro Luis Lazo (1)

=== August 14 ===
Team	1	2	3	4	5	6	7	8	9	R	H	E
United States	0	1	0	4	0	0	1	1	-	7	10	0
Netherlands	0	0	0	0	0	0	0	0	-	0	1	0
WP: Stephen Strasburg (1-0) LP: Shairon Martis (0-1); Home runs: USA: Matt Brown (1), Matt Laporta (1); NED: None

Team	1	2	3	4	5	6	R	H	E
China	0	0	0	0	0	0	0	2	0
South Korea	0	0	0	0	0	-	0	3	0

Team	1	2	3	4	5	6	7	8	9	R	H	E
Canada	0	0	2	1	0	2	0	1	0	6	9	2
Cuba	0	3	0	0	0	4	0	0	X	7	5	2
WP: Vicyohandri Odelín (1-0) LP: Jonathan Lockwood (0-1) Sv: Norberto González (1); Home runs: CAN: Michael Saunders (2), Nick Weglarz 2 (2); CUB: Alexander Malleta (1), Alfredo Despaigne (1)

Team	1	2	3	4	5	6	7	8	9	R	H	E
Japan	0	0	0	0	1	1	0	0	4	6	9	1
Chinese Taipei	0	0	0	1	0	0	0	0	0	1	4	0
WP: Hideaki Wakui (1-0) LP: Fu-Te Ni (0-1); Home runs: JPN: Shinnosuke Abe (1); TPE: None

=== August 15 ===
Team	1	2	3	4	5	6	7	8	9	10	11	12	R	H	E
Chinese Taipei	0	0	0	0	1	1	0	0	1	0	0	4	7	11	1
China	0	0	0	0	0	0	0	3	0	0	0	5	8	11	3
WP: Jiangang Lv (1-0) LP: Chien-Fu Yang (0-1); Home runs: TPE: Kuo-Hui Lo (1); CHN: None

Team	1	2	3	4	5	6	7	8	9	10	11	R	H	E
Cuba	2	0	0	0	0	0	0	1	0	0	2	5	10	0
United States	0	0	0	2	0	0	0	1	0	0	1	4	6	0
WP: Pedro Luis Lazo (1-0) LP: Jeff Stevens (0-2); Home runs: CUB: Alfredo Despaigne (2); USA: Jayson Nix (1)

Team	1	2	3	4	5	6	7	8	9	R	H	E
South Korea	0	0	1	0	0	0	0	0	0	1	3	0
Canada	0	0	0	0	0	0	0	0	0	0	5	1
WP: Hyun-Jin Ryu (1-0) LP: Mike Johnson (0-1); Home runs: KOR: Keun-Woo Jeong (1); CAN: None

Team	1	2	3	4	5	6	7	8	9	R	H	E
Netherlands	0	0	0	0	0	0	0	0	0	0	4	1
Japan	4	0	0	0	0	0	0	2	X	6	10	0
WP: Toshiya Sugiuchi (1-0) LP: Alexander Smit (0-1); Home runs: NED: None; JPN: Takahiko Sato (1)

=== August 16 ===
Team	1	2	3	4	5	6	7	8	9	R	H	E
Canada	0	1	2	1	0	0	0	0	0	4	10	1
United States	0	0	0	2	1	0	2	0	X	5	9	1
WP: Brian Duensing (1-0) LP: Chris Reitsma (0-1); Home runs: CAN: None; USA: Brian Barden (1)

Team	1	2	3	4	5	6	7	8	9	R	H	E
Chinese Taipei	0	0	0	0	0	0	0	0	0	0	4	1
Cuba	0	0	0	0	0	0	1	0	X	1	5	0
WP: Elier Sánchez (1-0) LP: Chen-Chang Lee (0-1) Sv: Norberto González (2); Home runs: TPE: None; CUB: Frederich Cepeda (1)

Team	1	2	3	4	5	6	7	8	9	R	H	E
Netherlands	0	0	0	1	5	0	0	0	0	6	9	1
China	0	0	1	0	1	0	0	1	1	4	11	1
WP: Leon Boyd (1-0) LP: Kai Liu (0-1) Sv: David Bergman (1); Home runs: NED: Sharnol Adriana (1), Sidney de Jong (1), Bryan Engelhardt (1); CHN: None

Team	1	2	3	4	5	6	7	8	9	R	H	E
South Korea	0	0	0	0	0	0	2	0	3	5	9	1
Japan	0	0	0	0	0	2	0	0	1	3	7	1
WP: Suk-Min Yoon (2-0) LP: Hitoki Iwase (0-1) Sv: Tae-Hyon Chong (1); Home runs: KOR: Dae-Ho Lee (2); JPN: Takahiro Arai (1)

=== August 17 ===
Team	6	7	8	9	10	11	R	H	E
China	-	0	0	0	0	0	0	4	2
South Korea	0	0	0	0	0	1	1	7	0
WP: Seung-Hwan Oh (1-0) LP: Jiangang Lu (1-1)

=== August 18 ===
Team	1	2	3	4	5	6	7	8	9	R	H	E
Japan	0	0	0	0	1	0	0	0	0	1	5	0
Canada	0	0	0	0	0	0	0	0	0	0	2	2
WP: Yoshihisa Naruse (1-0) LP: Chris Begg (1-1) Sv: Koji Uehara (1); Home runs: JPN: Atsunori Inaba (1); CAN: None

Team	1	2	3	4	5	6	7	8	9	R	H	E
South Korea	7	1	0	0	0	0	1	0	0	9	16	2
Chinese Taipei	0	2	0	0	4	2	0	0	0	8	12	2
WP: Ki-Joo Han (1-0) LP: Fu-Te Ni (0-2) Sv: Suk-Min Yoon (1); Home runs: KOR: Young-Min Ko (1); TPE: None

Team	1	2	3	4	5	6	7	8	9	R	H	E
Cuba	1	0	0	0	5	4	0	4	-	14	16	0
Netherlands	0	1	1	0	0	0	1	0	-	3	10	2
WP: Jonder Martínez (1-0) LP: Juan Carlos Sulbaran (0-1); Home runs: CUB: None; NED: Bryan Engelhardt (2), Percy Isenia (1)

Team	1	2	3	4	5	6	7	8	9	R	H	E
China	0	0	0	0	0	0	0	0	1	1	4	1
United States	1	0	0	0	3	1	4	0	X	9	9	0
WP: Jake Arrieta (1-0) LP: Chenhao Li (0-1); Home runs: CHN: Yang Yang (1); USA: None

=== August 19 ===
Team	1	2	3	4	5	6	7	8	9	R	H	E
Canada	0	0	1	2	0	0	0	1	0	4	7	1
Netherlands	0	0	0	0	0	0	0	0	0	0	2	0
WP: Brooks McNiven (1-0) LP: Shairon Martis (0-2)

Team	1	2	3	4	5	6	7	8	9	R	H	E
Cuba	0	3	0	0	0	0	0	1	0	4	7	2
South Korea	0	0	0	5	0	1	1	0	X	7	9	0
WP: Seung-Jun Song (1-0) LP: Vicyohandri Odelín (1-1) Sv: Seung-Hwan Oh (1)

Team	1	2	3	4	5	6	7	8	9	R	H	E
China	0	0	0	0	0	0	0	-	-	0	2	0
Japan	0	3	1	0	0	6	X	-	-	10	10	0
WP: Hideaki Wakui (2-0) LP: Nan Wang (0-1); Home runs: CHN: None; JPN: Tsuyoshi Nishioka (1)

Team	1	2	3	4	5	6	7	8	9	R	H	E
Chinese Taipei	0	0	0	0	1	0	1	0	0	2	5	0
United States	0	0	0	0	1	2	0	1	X	4	10	2
WP: Brandon Knight (1-0) LP: Wen-Hsiung Hsu (0-1) Sv: Kevin Jepsen (1); Home runs: TPE: Chih-Sheng Lin (1); USA: John Gall (1)

=== August 20 ===
Team	1	2	3	4	5	6	7	8	9	R	H	E
China	0	0	0	0	0	0	1	-	-	1	2	1
Cuba	0	9	1	4	1	2	X	-	-	17	20	0
WP: Jonder Martínez (2-0) LP: Tao Bu (0-2); Home runs: CHN: None; CUB: Giorbis Duvergel (1), Michel Enríquez (1), Ariel Pestano (1)

Team	1	2	3	4	5	6	7	8	9	R	H	E
South Korea	2	0	0	0	4	2	0	2	-	10	16	1
Netherlands	0	0	0	0	0	0	0	0	-	0	4	1
WP: Won-Sam Jang (1-0) LP: Alexander Smit (0-2); Home runs: KOR: Dae-Ho Lee (3), Taek-Keun Lee (1); NED: None

Team	1	2	3	4	5	6	7	8	9	10	11	12	R	H	E
Chinese Taipei	1	4	0	0	0	0	0	0	0	0	0	1	6	10	2
Canada	2	1	0	1	0	0	1	0	0	0	0	0	5	10	3
WP: Fu-Te Ni (1-2) LP: Chris Reitsma (0-2) Sv: Chih-Chia Chang (1); Home runs: TPE: Chih-Sheng Lin (2), Che-Hsuan Lin (1); CAN: Stubby Clapp (1)

Team	1	2	3	4	5	6	7	8	9	10	11	R	H	E
United States	0	0	0	0	0	0	0	0	0	0	4	4	5	0
Japan	0	0	0	0	0	0	0	0	0	0	2	2	5	0
WP: Jeff Stevens (1-2) LP: Hitoki Iwase (0-2) Sv: Casey Weathers (1)

== Knockout stage ==
Semifinals
2008-08-22 - Beijing
Japan	2
South Korea	6
2008-08-22 - Beijing
United States	2
Cuba	10

Gold Medal Match
2008-08-23 - Beijing
South Korea	3
Cuba	2
Bronze Medal Match
2008-08-23 - Beijing
Japan	4
United States	8

=== Semifinals ===
Team	1	2	3	4	5	6	7	8	9	R	H	E
Japan	1	0	1	0	0	0	0	0	0	2	6	2
South Korea	0	0	0	1	0	0	1	4	X	6	10	1
WP: Kwang-Hyun Kim (1-0) LP: Hitoki Iwase (0-3); Home runs: JPN: None; KOR: Seung-Yeop Lee (1)

Team	1	2	3	4	5	6	7	8	9	R	H	E
United States	0	0	0	1	1	0	0	0	0	2	6	2
Cuba	0	0	2	1	0	1	0	6	X	10	14	2
WP: Norge Luis Vera (2-0) LP: Stephen Strasburg (1-1) Sv: Pedro Luis Lazo (2); Home runs: USA: None; CUB: Alfredo Despaigne (3), Frederich Cepeda (2), Alexei Bell (1), Ariel Pestano (2)

=== Bronze medal match ===
Team	1	2	3	4	5	6	7	8	9	R	H	E
Japan	1	0	3	0	0	0	0	0	0	4	6	1
United States	0	1	3	0	4	0	0	0	X	8	9	0
WP: Brett Anderson (1-0) LP: Kenshin Kawakami (0-1); Home runs: JPN: Masahiro Araki (1), Norichika Aoki (1); USA: Matt LaPorta (2), Matt Brown (2), Jason Donald (1)

=== Gold medal match ===
23 August 2008 18:00 WKB Main Field
Team	1	2	3	4	5	6	7	8	9	R	H	E
South Korea	2	0	0	0	0	0	1	0	0	3	4	0
Cuba	1	0	0	0	0	0	1	0	0	2	5	1
WP: Hyun-Jin Ryu (2-0) LP: Norberto González (0-1) Sv: Tae-Hyon Chong (2); Home runs: KOR: Seung-Yeop Lee (2); CUB: Michel Enríquez (2), Alexei Bell (2)

== Final standings ==
Place	Team
Gold	South Korea
Silver	Cuba
Bronze	United States
4	Japan
5	Chinese Taipei
6	Canada
7	Netherlands
8	China

2008 Olympic champions

South Korea
First title
