= Giorvis Duvergel =

Cuban baseball player (born 1979)

- Outfielder
- Born: 3 September 1979 (age 46); Guantánamo, Guantánamo Province, Cuba
- Bats: Left Throws: Left

Teams
- Indios de Guantánamo (1999–2013; 2014–2017); Vegueros de Pinar del Río (2013–2014)
Medals
Men's baseball
Representing Cuba
Summer Olympics
Silver medal – second place	2008 Beijing	National team
Baseball World Cup
Silver medal – second place	2007 Taipei	National team
Silver medal – second place	2009 Nettuno	National team
Intercontinental Cup
Gold medal – first place	2002 Havana	National team
Gold medal – first place	2006 Taichung	National team
Gold medal – first place	2010 Taichung	National team
Pan American Games
Gold medal – first place	2007 Rio de Janeiro	National team
Bronze medal – third place	2011 Guadalajara	National team
Central American and Caribbean Games
Gold medal – first place	2006 Cartagena	National team

Giorvis Duvergel (born 3 September 1979) is an Olympic baseball player for Cuba. He was part of the Cuban team which won a silver medal at the 2008 Summer Olympics.

In April 2023, it was reported that Duvergel had emigrated to the United States.
