= Matthew Brown (baseball) =

American baseball player (born 1982)

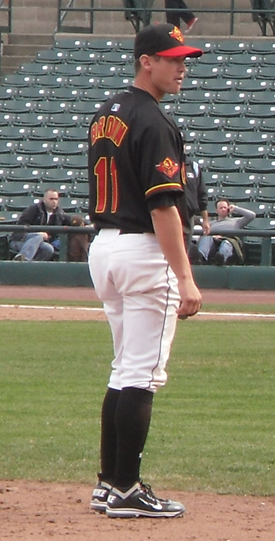
- Brown at third for Rochester in April 2011
- Third baseman
- Born: August 8, 1982 (age 43); Bellevue, Washington, U.S.
- Batted: Right Threw: Right

MLB debut
- May 10, 2007, for the Los Angeles Angels of Anaheim

Last MLB appearance
- September 28, 2008, for the Los Angeles Angels of Anaheim

Career statistics
- Batting average: .042
- Home runs: 0
- Runs batted in: 3
- Stats at Baseball Reference

Teams
- Los Angeles Angels of Anaheim (2007–2008)
Medals
Men's baseball
Representing United States
Olympic Games
Bronze medal – third place	2008 Beijing	Team

Matthew Benjamin Brown (born August 8, 1982) is a former third baseman. Brown was selected by the Anaheim Angels in the 10th round of the 2001 Major League Baseball draft out of Coeur d'Alene (Idaho) High School.

== Career ==
He debuted on May 10, 2007, flying out to left field in a pinch-hit appearance against the Cleveland Indians. He never collected a hit in five major league at-bats in 2007, however had one hit, a double, in 2008 (14 at-bats). He was batting .326 with 21 home runs and 67 RBI for the Angels' Triple-A Pacific Coast League affiliate, the Salt Lake Bees when his season ended as a result of being selected for the 2008 USA Baseball Olympic Team.

Brown signed a minor league contract with the Minnesota Twins in December 2010 to provide organizational depth behind third baseman Danny Valencia. He last played for the Acereros de Monclova in the Mexican League in 2012.
