= Luis Miguel Rodríguez (baseball) =

Cuban baseball player (born 1973)

Medal record

Men's baseball

Representing Cuba

Summer Olympics
Silver medal – second place	2008 Beijing	Team

Luis Miguel Rodríguez (born May 3, 1973) is a baseball player for Cuba. He was pitcher in the Cuban team which won a silver medal at the 2008 Summer Olympics.
