= Luis Miguel Navas =

Cuban baseball player

Medal record

Men's baseball

Representing Cuba

Summer Olympics
Silver medal – second place	2008 Beijing	National team

Baseball World Cup
Silver medal – second place	2009 Nettuno	National team

Pan American Games
Gold medal – first place	2007 Rio de Janeiro	National team

Luis Miguel Navas González (born 1980) is a baseball player for Cuba. He was part of the Cuban team which won a silver medal at the 2008 Summer Olympics. He plays shortstop.
