= Terry Tiffee =

American baseball player (born 1979)

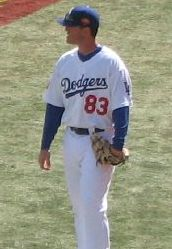
- Tiffee during the MLB China Series in 2008
- Third baseman
- Born: April 21, 1979 (age 46); North Little Rock, Arkansas, U.S.
- Batted: Switch Threw: Right

MLB debut
- September 1, 2004, for the Minnesota Twins

Last MLB appearance
- June 5, 2008, for the Los Angeles Dodgers

MLB statistics
- Batting average: .226
- Home runs: 5
- Runs batted in: 29
- Stats at Baseball Reference

Teams
- Minnesota Twins (2004–2006); Los Angeles Dodgers (2008)
Medals
Men's baseball
Representing United States
Olympic Games
Bronze medal – third place	2008 Beijing	Team
Baseball World Cup
Gold medal – first place	2009 Nettuno	National team

Terry Ronald Tiffee (born April 21, 1979) is an American former professional baseball infielder. He played in Major League Baseball for the Minnesota Twins and Los Angeles Dodgers.

== Career ==
Tiffee graduated from Sylvan Hills High School in 1997 and Pratt Community College (Kansas) in 1999. After his time at Pratt, Tiffee signed a letter of intent to play baseball at Louisiana State University, but chose instead to sign with the Minnesota Twins (scout Gregg Miller) when he was acquired in the 26th round of the June 1999 free agent draft.

Tiffee played with the Rochester Red Wings in the 2006 Governor's Cup International League Championship Series. Rochester lost the series 3-2.

After playing parts of three seasons for the Twins from 2004-2006, Tiffee signed a minor league deal with the Baltimore Orioles on January 5, 2007. On November 29, 2007, Tiffee signed a minor league contract with the Los Angeles Dodgers and was assigned to play for the Triple-A Las Vegas 51s.

On May 25, 2008, Tiffee's contract was purchased by the Dodgers, and he was added to the active roster. He singled in his first at-bat for the Dodgers as a pinch hitter that same day. He compiled a .250 average in six games with the Dodgers before being designated for assignment on June 7, 2008, to make room for Ángel Berroa. He cleared waivers and was optioned back to Las Vegas. He signed a minor league contract with the Philadelphia Phillies on December 17, 2008.

Tiffee began 2011 with the Lancaster Barnstormers in independent baseball. He signed a minor league contract with the New York Yankees on June 22, 2011, and was assigned to the Triple-A Scranton/Wilkes-Barre Yankees. He was released on August 22.

The Miami Marlins signed him to a minor league contract on January 19, 2012. He signed a minor league deal with the Atlanta Braves on July 12, 2012 and was assigned to the Gwinnett Braves. He elected free agency on November 2, 2012.

== 2008 USA Baseball Olympic Team ==
Tiffee had 351 at bats with Triple-A Las Vegas and was batting .376 with 8 home runs, 36 doubles, and 61 Runs batted in when he was announced as a member of the U.S. Olympic Baseball Team.

== Personal ==
Tiffee met his wife, Kelli, in Liberal, Kansas where he was playing fall league. They have a daughter and twin sons.
