= Jonder Martínez =

Cuban baseball player (born 1978)

Cocodrilos de Matanzas – No. 27
- Pitcher / Coach
- Born: 22 June 1978 (age 48); Mariel, Cuba
- Bats: Right Throws: Right
- Stats at Baseball Reference
Medals
Men's baseball
Representing Cuba
World Baseball Classic
Silver medal – second place	2006 San Diego	Team
Summer Olympics
Gold medal – first place	2004 Athens	National team
Silver medal – second place	2008 Beijing	National team
Baseball World Cup
Gold medal – first place	2003 Havana	National team
Silver medal – second place	2007 Taipei	National team
Silver medal – second place	2009 Nettuno	National team
Intercontinental Cup
Gold medal – first place	2010 Taichung	National team
Pan American Games
Gold medal – first place	2007 Rio de Janeiro	National team
Bronze medal – third place	2011 Guadalajara	National team
Central American and Caribbean Games
Gold medal – first place	2014 Veracruz	Team

Jonder Martínez Martínez (born 22 June 1978) is a former right-handed pitcher for Matanzas of the Cuban National Series and the Cuban national baseball team. Martínez currently serves as the pitching coach of Matanzas.

Martínez played for the national team at the 1995 World Junior Championship, 2003 Baseball World Cup, 2004 Summer Olympics, 2006 World Baseball Classic, 2006 Haarlem Baseball Week, 2007 Pan American Games, 2007 Baseball World Cup and 2008 Summer Olympics, 2014 Central American and Caribbean Games and 2017 World Baseball Classic.
