= Pedro Luis Lazo =

Cuban baseball player (born 1973)

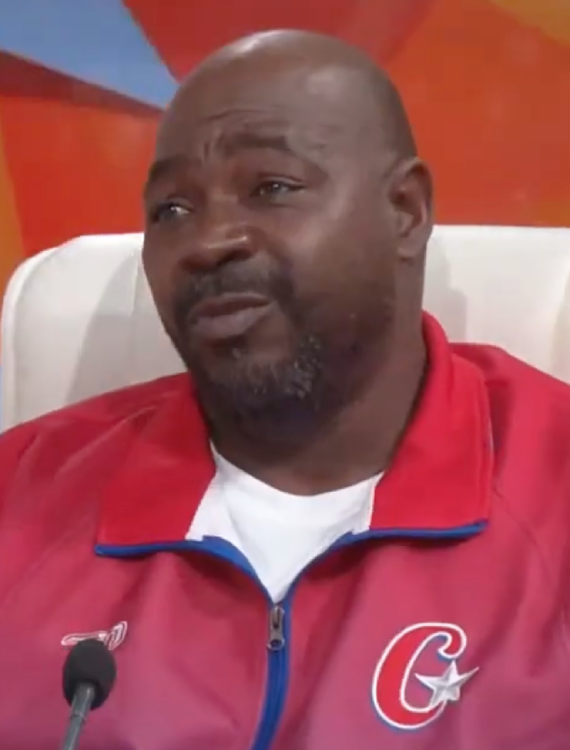
- Lazo in 2023
- Pitcher / Coach
- Born: 15 April 1973 (age 53); Río Feo, Pinar del Río, Cuba
- Batted: Right Threw: Right

Last SNB appearance
- 18 December, 2010, for the Pinar del Río

SNB statistics
- Win–loss record: 181–102
- Earned run average: 3.40
- Strikeouts: 2,335

Teams
- Forestales (1990–1992); Pinar del Río (1992–2010)
Medals
Men's baseball
Representing Cuba
World Baseball Classic
| Silver medal – second place | 2006 San Diego | Team |
Olympic Games
| Gold medal – first place | 1996 Atlanta | Team |
| Silver medal – second place | 2000 Sydney | Team |
| Gold medal – first place | 2004 Athens | Team |
| Silver medal – second place | 2008 Beijing | Team |
Baseball World Cup
| Gold medal – first place | 1998 Italy | Team |
| Gold medal – first place | 2001 Taipei | Team |
| Gold medal – first place | 2003 Cuba | Team |
| Gold medal – first place | 2005 Netherlands | Team |
| Silver medal – second place | 2007 Taipei | Team |
| Silver medal – second place | 2009 Nettuno | Team |
Intercontinental Cup
| Gold medal – first place | 1995 Havana | Team |
| Silver medal – second place | 1997 Barcelona | Team |
| Gold medal – first place | 2002 Havana | Team |
| Gold medal – first place | 2006 Taichung | Team |
Pan American Games
| Gold medal – first place | 1995 Mar del Plata | Team |
| Gold medal – first place | 1999 Winnipeg | Team |
| Gold medal – first place | 2007 Rio de Janeiro | Team |
Central American and Caribbean Games
| Gold medal – first place | 1998 Maracaibo | Team |
| Gold medal – first place | 2006 Cartagena | Team |

Pedro Luis Lazo Iglesias (born 15 April 1973) is a Cuban former baseball pitcher. He was used predominantly as a reliever in international competition, although he was a starter in the Cuban National Series, where he played for Pinar del Río. His fastball was clocked at 97 mph, and he combined it with a mid 80s slider. He is considered one of the greatest pitchers in Cuban baseball history.

Since 2022, he has been the pitching coach for the Cuba national baseball team.

== Early life ==
Lazo was born on 15 April 1973 in Río Feo, a village in the municipality of San Luis, Pinar del Río Province, Cuba.

== Playing career ==
=== Cuban National Series ===
Lazo made his Cuban National Series debut during the 1990–91 season playing for the Forestales of Pinar del Río; he achieved his first victory on 10 November 1991 against the Metropolitanos of the Havana. In 1992, ahead of the 1992–93 season, the Forestales and the Vegueros, the two teams from the Pinar del Río Province, were merged into a single club, named only Pinar del Río.

He retired after the 2009–10 season as the Cuban National Series' all-time wins leader with 257 career victories.

Cuban National Series career statistics
| Seasons | G | W | L | SV | IP | H | ER | BB | SO | ERA |
|---|---|---|---|---|---|---|---|---|---|---|
| 20 | 525 | 257 | 136 | 20 | 3260.1 | 2999 | 1166 | 946 | 2426 | 3.22 |

=== Piratas de Campeche ===
Despite having announced his retirement after the 2009–10 Cuban National Series season, Lazo returned to professional baseball in 2012, joining the Piratas de Campeche of the Mexican League. He appeared in 33 games, all in relief, compiling a 2–2 record with three saves, a 2.25 ERA, 36.0 innings pitched, and 34 strikeouts.

=== Cañeros de Los Mochis ===
Later in 2012, Lazo joined the Cañeros de Los Mochis of the Mexican Pacific League, Mexico's winter league. He earned his first and only victory on 15 November 2012, pitching seven scoreless innings in the Cañeros' 9–0 shutout victory over the Naranjeros de Hermosillo. He appeared in nine games, making seven starts and compiling a 1–4 record with 41.0 innings pitched, 31 strikeouts, and a 5.05 ERA.

== International career ==
Lazo was part of the gold medal-winning Cuban teams at the 1996 Atlanta Olympics and 2004 Athens games, and won silver at the 2000 Sydney and 2008 Beijing Olympics. He also appeared in the exhibition series between the Cuban national team and the Baltimore Orioles in 1999.

During the Baseball World Cup in 2005 in the Netherlands, Lazo had 2 wins, 0 losses with 2 saves, a 0.54 earned run average, and just 7 hits against in 16 2/3 innings. He also pitched for Cuba in the World Baseball Classic in March 2006 and recorded an impressive 5 inning save against Dominican Republic in the semifinals matchup.

== Coaching career ==
In September 2022, Lazo was appointed as the pitching coach of the Cuba national baseball team ahead of the 2023 World Baseball Classic and continues to serve in that role.

== Personal life ==
His cousin, Raudel Lazo, defected from Cuba to play in Major League Baseball.
