= Lee Taek-keun =

South Korean baseball player (born 1980)

Lotte Giants
- Outfielder / General Manager
- Born: July 10, 1980 (age 46); Busan, South Korea
- Bats: Right Throws: Right

KBO debut
- April 6, 2003, for the Hyundai Unicorns

KBO statistics
- Batting average: .302
- Home runs: 136
- Runs batted in: 773
- Stats at Baseball Reference

Teams
- As player: Hyundai Unicorns (2003–2007); Woori Heroes (2008–2009); LG Twins (2010–2011); Nexen/Kiwoom Heroes (2012–2020); As Baseball Commentator: SBS Sports (2023 WBC, 2024–2025); As Committee Member in KBO: Power Enhancement (2025–2026); As General Manager: Lotte Giants (2027–present)

Career highlights and awards
- 2x KBO League Golden Glove Award (2006, 2009)
Medals
Men's baseball
Olympic Games
Gold medal – first place	2008 Beijing	Team
World Baseball Classic
Silver medal – second place	2009 Los Angeles	Team

Lee Taek-keun (Korean: 이택근; Hanja: 李宅根; born July 10, 1980) is a former outfielder who played in the Korea Baseball Organization. He batted and threw right-handed.

== Amateur career ==
Attending Kyungnam Commerce High School in Busan, South Korea, Lee was considered one of the top high school catching prospects. In 1998, he was selected for the South Korea national junior team that finished in 3rd place at the 1998 Asian Junior Baseball Championship in Kaohsiung, Taiwan.

Upon graduation from high school in 1999, he chose to play college baseball at Korea University instead of turning pro directly. Lee was soon regarded as one of the best offensive amateur catchers in the nation, becoming a fixture in the starting nine in his first collegiate season. In his freshman year at Korea University, he was called up to the South Korea national baseball team, and participated in the 1999 Intercontinental Cup. In Korea's first game of the round-robin tournament against Cuba, he led his team to a memorable 4-3 victory, which was South Korea's first victory over Cuba at international baseball competitions organized by the IBAF.

In 2001, Lee was selected for the South Korea national baseball team, that finished in 6th place at the 2001 Baseball World Cup. Lee was one of five amateur players on the roster.

In 2002, Lee competed for the South Korea national baseball team again in the inaugural World University Baseball Championship held in Messina, Italy, manning the designated hitting and the catching positions.

=== Notable international careers ===
Year	Venue	Competition	Team	Individual note
1998	Japan	Asian Junior Baseball Championship	Bronze medal	All-Star (catcher)
1999	Australia	Intercontinental Cup	7th	
2001	Chinese Taipei	Baseball World Cup	6th	
2002	Italy	World University Baseball Championship	5th	

== Professional career ==
Signed by the Hyundai Unicorns in 2003, Lee started his pro career as a catcher. Although Lee immediately became one of the most reliable and consistent hitters in the team, he failed to make an impact with the Unicorns as a catcher due to his defensive deficiencies. So, the team convinced Lee to convert to the outfield in spring training 2006. As the 2006 season started, the team finally moved Lee to the outfield permernantly.

In the 2006 season, he finished second in batting average (.322), tenth in RBI (66) and sixth in hits (135), and was selected to the All-Star team and won his first KBO League Golden Glove Award. After the season, he was selected for the South Korea national team and competed in the 2006 Asian Games held in Doha, Qatar.

In the 2007 season, he finished ninth in batting average (.313) and sixth in hits (137).

In the 2008 season, Lee had a .317 batting average, that ranked seventh overall, with 12 home runs and 118 hits. He also stole 18 bases, batting leadoff. In August 2008, he competed for the South Korean national team in the 2008 Summer Olympics held in Beijing, China, where they won the gold medal in the baseball tournament.

In March 2009, Lee was called up to the South Korea national baseball team for the 2009 World Baseball Classic. He appeared in 7 games, but mostly served as a pinch runner and backup center fielder. In the 2009 KBO season, Lee had another impressive performance. He batted .311 (eighth in the league) and posted career-highs in hits (142), home runs (15), doubles (26), RBI (66), runs (84) and stolen bases (43). Lee finished third in stolen bases (43 in 51 attempts) and his stolen base percentage (.843) was higher than title-winner Lee Dae-Hyung and runner-up Jeong Keun-Woo.

On December 11, 2009, he won his second Golden Glove Award as an outfielder.

On May 18, 2017, he won the game against Hanwha by hitting the first pinch-hitter-ending grand slam in the KBO league against Jung Woo-ram.

=== Awards and honors ===
- 2006 Golden Glove Award (Outfielder)
- 2009 Golden Glove Award (Outfielder)

=== Notable international careers ===
Year	Venue	Competition	Team	Individual note
2006	Qatar	Asian Games	Bronze medal	.182 BA (2-for-11), 1 RBI, 1 R
2007	Chinese Taipei	Asian Baseball Championship	Silver medal	.270 BA (2-for-7), 1 RBI
2008	Chinese Taipei	Final Olympic Qualification Tournament	Silver medal	.320 BA (8-for-25), 5 RBI, 4 R
2008	China	Olympic Games	Gold medal	.125 BA (2-for-16), 1 HR, 3 RBI, 3 R
2009	United States	World Baseball Classic	Silver medal	.167 BA (1-for-6), 1 R, 2 BB, 1 SB

== Controversy ==
In 2018 Lee was suspended 36 games for the 2019 season by the league because of an earlier (May 2015) incident in which he struck a younger teammate, Moon Woo-ram, in the face with a bat multiple times, leaving him with a concussion and serious swelling in the face. Lee said that he had hit Moon because he didn't follow his order of getting a haircut.

== Filmography ==
=== Television show ===
Year	Title	Role	Notes	Ref.
2022	Strongest Baseball	Cast Member		
