= Lee Jong-wook (baseball) =

South Korean baseball player (born 1980)

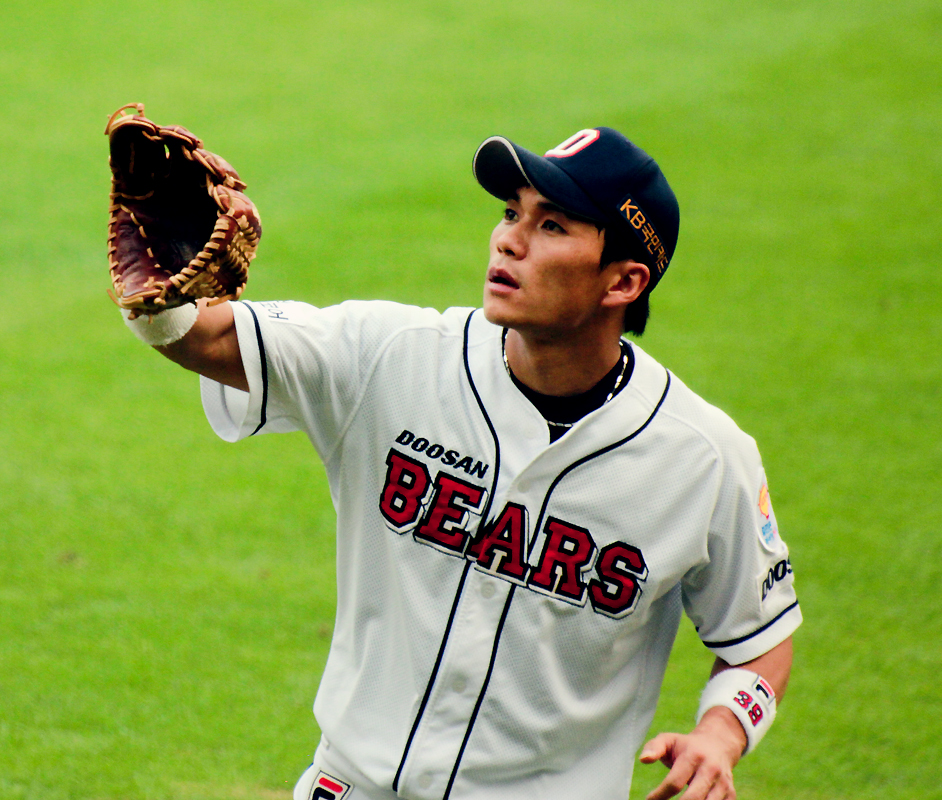
- Lee Jong-wook in 2013

Samsung Lions – No. 93
- Outfielder / Coach
- Born: June 18, 1980 (age 46)
- Batted: Left Threw: Left

KBO debut
- February 2, 2003, for the Hyundai Unicorns

Last KBO appearance
- 2018, for the NC Dinos

KBO statistics
- Batting average: .291
- Home runs: 41
- Runs batted in: 543
- Stolen bases: 340
- Stats at Baseball Reference

Teams
- As player: Hyundai Unicorns (2003–2005); Doosan Bears (2006–2013); NC Dinos (2014–2018); As coach: NC Dinos (2020–2024); Samsung Lions (2025–present)

Career highlights and awards
- As coach: Korean Series champion (2026)
Medals
Men's baseball
Olympics
| Gold medal – first place | 2008 Beijing | Team |
World Baseball Classic
| Silver medal – second place | 2009 Los Angeles | Team |

- Lee Jong-wook
- Hangul: 이종욱
- Hanja: 李鐘旭
- RR: I Jonguk
- MR: I Chonguk

Lee Jong-wook (Korean: 이종욱; Hanja: 李鍾旭; born June 18, 1980) is a South Korean former professional baseball outfielder. He played in the KBO League for the Hyundai Unicorns, Doosan Bears, and NC Dinos from 2003 to 2018.

== Professional career ==
In 2003, he joined the Hyundai Unicorns after graduating from Youngnam University in Daegu. However, he did not play any games since he joined the military service in December of that year.

In 2006, when he was discharged from the military, he joined the Doosan Bears as a trainee. At that time, he tried to practice and develop his skill. At last, The Doosan's Head coach Kim Kyung-Moon selected him and Lee tried to survive, not to lose the opportunity. As a result, he could settle down the major group of Bears.

In Summer Olympic Games 2008, Lee contributed to win the gold medal for his national team. In the team's first game of round-robin play against the United States, he hit the game-winning sacrifice fly to score Lee Taek-Keun in the bottom of the 9th inning.

His biggest advantage was to run fast. Therefore, he made fifty-one steals in that season even though his team failed to join the post-season in 2006. Next year, he made forty-seven steals while he hit a homer and made a 0.316 hitting average. He can run to the third base if he hit a ball to the further course of a stadium. He can steal to the second or third base in any situation even a good pitcher marks tightly or a catcher throws a ball exactly. In addition, he can catch a flying ball which drops into the point in which any outfielder get hardly or miss.

He contributed and led the Bears to the Final round of 2007 and 2008 post-season. Especially he made 0.517 hitting average and three SBs in playoffs 2008. And won the Most Valuable Player straight two years in 2007 and 2008 playoff of two post-seasons.

=== Awards and honors ===
- 2007 Golden Glove Award (Outfielder)
- 2008 Golden Glove Award (Outfielder)
- 2010 Golden Glove Award (Outfielder)

=== Achievements ===
- 2006 Stolen Bases Title
- 2008 Runs Leader

== Career statistics ==
| Year | Age | Team | Lg | Pos | G | AB | R | H | 2B | 3B | HR | RBI | TB | SB | CS | SH | BB | HBP | K | GIDP | E | AVG | OBP | SLG | OPS |
|---|---|---|---|---|---|---|---|---|---|---|---|---|---|---|---|---|---|---|---|---|---|---|---|---|---|
| 2006 | 26 | Doosan | KBO | OF | 120 | 388 | 76 | 110 | 14 | 6 | 1 | 32 | 139 | **51** | 7 | 12 | 40 | 7 | 60 | 1 | 6 | .284 | .351 | .358 | .709 |
| 2007 | 27 | Doosan | KBO | OF | 123 | 465 | 84 | 147 | 20 | **12** | 1 | 46 | 194 | 47 | 14 | 10 | 48 | 4 | 74 | 6 | 0 | .316 | .378 | .417 | .795 |
| 2008 | 28 | Doosan | KBO | OF | 122 | 458 | **98** | 138 | 14 | 5 | 0 | 28 | 162 | 47 | 8 | 8 | 52 | 4 | 53 | 4 | 2 | .301 | .372 | .354 | .726 |
| Total | | | KBO | OF | 365 | 1311 | 258 | 395 | 48 | 23 | 2 | 106 | 495 | 145 | 29 | 30 | 140 | 15 | 187 | 11 | 8 | .301 | .368 | .378 | .746 |

Bold = led KBO
