= Mexico at the 2008 Summer Olympics =

- IOC code: MEX
- NOC: Mexican Olympic Committee
- Website: www.soycom.org (in Spanish)

in Beijing
- Competitors: 85 in 21 sports
- Flag bearers: Paola Espinosa (opening); Tatiana Ortiz (closing)
- Medals Ranked 36th: Gold 2 Silver 0 Bronze 2 Total 4

Summer Olympics appearances (overview)
- 1900; 1904–1920; 1924; 1928; 1932; 1936; 1948; 1952; 1956; 1960; 1964; 1968; 1972; 1976; 1980; 1984; 1988; 1992; 1996; 2000; 2004; 2008; 2012; 2016; 2020; 2024; 2028

Mexico competed at the 2008 Summer Olympics in Beijing. The country sent 85 competitors (43 men and 42 women) and participated in 23 sports. Mexico's flag-bearer at the opening ceremony was diver Paola Espinosa. Mexican athletes won two gold medals at the games for the first time since the 1984 Olympics.

== Medalists ==
Medal	Name	Sport	Event	Date
Gold	Guillermo Pérez Sandoval	Taekwondo	Men's 58 kg	20 August
Gold	María del Rosario Espinoza	Taekwondo	Women's +67 kg	23 August
Bronze	Paola Espinosa Sánchez; Tatiana Ortiz Galicia	Diving	Women's 10 m synchronized platform	12 August
Bronze	Damaris Gabriela Aguirre	Weightlifting	Women's 75 kg	15 August

== Archery ==
Mexico sent archers, two men and two women, to the Olympics for the eighth time, and had yet to win an Olympic medal in the sport. Two men received qualifying places in archery, after Luis Velez earned a qualifying spot during the 2007 World Outdoor Target Championships and Juan Serrano added another spot at the Pan American championships. The two women, Mariana Avitia and Aída Román, both earned their Olympic spots at the Pan American tournament.

Men

Athlete	Event	Ranking round		Round of 64	Round of 32	Round of 16	Quarterfinals	Semifinals	Final / BM	
Athlete	Event	Score	Seed	Opposition Score	Opposition Score	Opposition Score	Opposition Score	Opposition Score	Opposition Score	Rank
Juan René Serrano	Individual	679	1	Muaausa (SAM) (64); W 116–88	Morillo (ESP) (33); W 112–111	Kunda (BLR) (48); W 110–106	Wunderle (USA) (41); W 113–106	Park K-M (KOR) (4); L 112–115	Badënov (RUS) (31); L 110–115	4
Eduardo Vélez	Individual	660	24	Wunderle (USA) (41); L 102–106	Did not advance					

Women

Athlete	Event	Ranking round		Round of 64	Round of 32	Round of 16	Quarterfinals	Semifinals	Final / BM	
Athlete	Event	Score	Seed	Opposition Score	Opposition Score	Opposition Score	Opposition Score	Opposition Score	Opposition Score	Rank
Mariana Avitia	Individual	641	20	Son H-Y (PRK) (45); W 112–107	Ćwienczek (POL) (13); W 109–100	Narimanidze (GEO) (4); W 109–108	Kwon U-S (PRK) (5); L 99–105	Did not advance		
Aída Román	Individual	646	12	D'Unienville (MRI) (53); W 108–97	Koval (UKR) (21); W 111–105	Kwon U-S (PRK) (5); L 100–105	Did not advance			

== Athletics ==
Key

- Note–Ranks given for track events are within the athlete's heat only
- Q = Qualified for the next round
- q = Qualified for the next round as a fastest loser or, in field events, by position without achieving the qualifying target
- NR = National record
- N/A = Round not applicable for the event
- Bye = Athlete not required to compete in round

Men
Track & road events

Athlete	Event	Heat		Final	
Athlete	Event	Result	Rank	Result	Rank
Juan Luis Barrios	5000 m	13:42.39	7 q	13:19.79	7
David Galván	10000 m	—N/a		DNF	
Juan Carlos Romero	10000 m	—N/a		28:26.57	29
Alejandro Suarez	10000 m	—N/a		29:24.78	35
Francisco Bautista	Marathon	—N/a		2:29:28	66
Carlos Cordero	Marathon	—N/a		2:18:40	32
Procopio Franco	Marathon	—N/a		2:23:24	47
David Mejia	20 km walk	—N/a		1:26:45	36
Eder Sánchez	20 km walk	—N/a		1:21:53	15
Mario Iván Flores	50 km walk	—N/a		3:58:04	23
Horacio Nava	50 km walk	—N/a		3:45:21	6
Jesús Sánchez	50 km walk	—N/a		3:53:58	18

Field events

Athlete	Event	Qualification		Final	
Athlete	Event	Distance	Position	Distance	Position
Gerardo Martínez	High jump	2.15	=33	Did not advance	
Giovanni Lanaro	Pole vault	5.45	25	Did not advance	

Women
Track & road events

Athlete	Event	Heat		Semifinal		Final	
Athlete	Event	Result	Rank	Result	Rank	Result	Rank
Gabriela Medina	400 m	51.96	3 Q	52.97	8	Did not advance	
Dulce María Rodríguez	10000 m	—N/a				32:58.04	27
Karina Pérez	Marathon	—N/a				2:47:02	61
Madai Pérez	Marathon	—N/a				2:31:47	19
Patricia Rétiz	Marathon	—N/a				2:39:34	55
Karla Dueñas; Ruth Grajeda; Gabriela Medina; Zudikey Rodríguez; Maria Teresa Rugerio; Nallely Vela	4 × 400 m relay	3:30.36	7	—N/a		Did not advance	

Field events

Athlete	Event	Qualification		Final	
Athlete	Event	Distance	Position	Distance	Position
Romary Rifka	High jump	NM	—	Did not advance	

== Badminton ==
Athlete	Event	Round of 64	Round of 32	Round of 16	Quarterfinal	Semifinal	Final / BM	
Athlete	Event	Opposition Score	Opposition Score	Opposition Score	Opposition Score	Opposition Score	Opposition Score	Rank
Deyanira Angulo	Women's singles	Hosny (EGY); L 18–21, 21–7, 14–21	Did not advance					

== Boxing ==
Mexico qualified three boxers for the Olympic boxing tournament. Santos Reyes was the first, qualifying in featherweight at the World Championships. Valdez was the second, qualifying at the first American qualifier. Vargas was the last, earning his spot at the second American tournament.

Athlete	Event	Round of 32	Round of 16	Quarterfinals	Semifinals	Final	
Athlete	Event	Opposition Result	Opposition Result	Opposition Result	Opposition Result	Opposition Result	Rank
Óscar Valdez	Bantamweight	Badar-Uugan (MGL); L 4–15	Did not advance				
Arturo Santos	Featherweight	Okoth (KEN); W 6–2	Shili (TUN); W 14–2	Djelkhir (FRA); L 9–14	Did not advance		
Francisco Vargas	Lightweight	Soloniaina (MAD); W 9–2	Popescu (ROU); L 4–14	Did not advance			

== Canoeing ==
=== Sprint ===
Athlete	Event	Heats		Semifinals		Final	
Athlete	Event	Time	Rank	Time	Rank	Time	Rank
Manuel Cortina	Men's K-1 500 m	1:40.626	4 QS	1:48.333	7	Did not advance	
Manuel Cortina	Men's K-1 1000 m	3:41.433	7 QS	3:43.017	7	Did not advance	
Everardo Cristobal	Men's C-1 1000 m	4:15.280	6 QS	4:04.267	6	Did not advance	
Dimas Camilo Cortes; Everardo Cristobal	Men's C-2 500 m	1:54.090	8 QS	1:48.853	9	Did not advance	
Dimas Camilo Cortes; Everardo Cristobal	Men's C-2 1000 m	3:51.684	6 QS	3:49.695	7	Did not advance	

Qualification Legend: QS = Qualify to semi-final; QF = Qualify directly to final

== Cycling ==
=== Road ===
Athlete	Event	Time	Rank
Moises Aldape Chavez	Men's road race	6:28:08	47
Alessandra Grassi	Women's road race	3:36:35	45

== Diving ==
Men

Athlete	Events	Preliminaries		Semifinals		Final	
Athlete	Events	Points	Rank	Points	Rank	Points	Rank
Yahel Castillo	3 m springboard	480.65	3 Q	504.55	4 Q	462.10	7
Rommel Pacheco	10 m platform	465.45	9 Q	453.80	9 Q	460.20	8
Germán Sánchez	10 m platform	399.35	22	Did not advance			

Women

Athlete	Events	Preliminaries		Semifinals		Final	
Athlete	Events	Points	Rank	Points	Rank	Points	Rank
Jashia Luna	3 m springboard	276.85	17 Q	287.35	16	Did not advance	
Laura Sánchez	3 m springboard	334.35	5 Q	314.40	12 Q	312.25	10
Paola Espinosa	10 m platform	343.60	7 Q	400.75	2 Q	380.95	4
Tatiana Ortiz	10 m platform	345.70	6 Q	349.50	5 Q	343.60	5
Paola Espinosa; Tatiana Ortiz	10 m synchronized platform	—N/a				330.06	3rd place, bronze medalist(s)

== Equestrian ==
=== Dressage ===
Athlete	Horse	Event	Grand Prix		Grand Prix Special		Grand Prix Freestyle		Overall	
Athlete	Horse	Event	Score	Rank	Score	Rank	Score	Rank	Score	Rank
Bernadette Pujals	Vincent	Individual	69.250	12 Q	71.000	6 Q	72.350	11	71.675	9

=== Show jumping ===
Athlete	Horse	Event	Qualification								Final					Total	
Athlete	Horse	Event	Round 1		Round 2			Round 3			Round A		Round B			Total	
Athlete	Horse	Event	Penalties	Rank	Penalties	Total	Rank	Penalties	Total	Rank	Penalties	Rank	Penalties	Total	Rank	Penalties	Rank
Antonio Chedraui	Don Porfirio	Individual	1	=14	8	9	22 Q	8	17	=22*	did not advance					17	=22
Federico Fernández	Zorro	Individual	1	=14	9	10	26 Q	14	24	33 Q	12	=29	Did not advance			12	=29
Enrique Gonzalez	Frida	Individual	9	52	16	25	51	Did not advance								25	51
Alberto Michan	Chinobampo Lavita	Individual	12	64	9	21	32 Q	25	46	47 Q	12	=29	Did not advance			12	=29
Antonio Chedraui; Federico Fernández; Enrique Gonzalez; Alberto Michan	See above	Team	—N/a								26	9	Did not advance			26	9

== Fencing ==
Women

Athlete	Event	Round of 64	Round of 32	Round of 16	Quarterfinal	Semifinal	Final / BM	
Athlete	Event	Opposition Score	Opposition Score	Opposition Score	Opposition Score	Opposition Score	Opposition Score	Rank
Angélica Larios	Individual sabre	Navarro (ESP); L 4–15	Did not advance					

== Gymnastics ==
=== Artistic ===
Women

Athlete	Event	Qualification						Final					
Athlete	Event	Apparatus				Total	Rank	Apparatus				Total	Rank
Athlete	Event	F	V	UB	BB	Total	Rank	F	V	UB	BB	Total	Rank
Marisela Cantù	All-around	14.025	14.175	12.625	12.700	53.525	56	Did not advance					

== Judo ==
Athlete	Event	Round of 32	Round of 16	Quarterfinals	Semifinals	Repechage 1	Repechage 2	Repechage 3	Final / BM	
Athlete	Event	Opposition Result	Opposition Result	Opposition Result	Opposition Result	Opposition Result	Opposition Result	Opposition Result	Opposition Result	Rank
Arturo Martínez	Men's −100 kg	Moussima (CMR); L 0001–0100	Did not advance							
Vanessa Zambotti	Women's +78 kg	Bye	Bryant (GBR); W 0021–0001	Tsukada (JPN); L 0000–1000	Did not advance	Bye	Mondière (FRA); L 0000–1010	Did not advance		

== Modern pentathlon ==
Athlete	Event	Shooting (10 m air pistol)			Fencing (épée one touch)			Swimming (200 m freestyle)			Riding (show jumping)			Running (3000 m)			Total points	Final rank
Athlete	Event	Points	Rank	MP points	Results	Rank	MP points	Time	Rank	MP points	Penalties	Rank	MP points	Time	Rank	MP points	Total points	Final rank
Óscar Soto	Men's	171	31	988	20–15	7	880	2:10.60	30	1236	40	3	1160	9:21.95	9	1156	5420	8
Marlene Sánchez	Women's	186	4	1168	17–18	=18	808	2:27.39	31	1152	180	29	1020	11:18.11	30	1008	5156	28

== Rowing ==
Men

Athlete	Event	Heats		Quarterfinals		Semifinals		Final	
Athlete	Event	Time	Rank	Time	Rank	Time	Rank	Time	Rank
Patrick Loliger	Single sculls	7:22.55	3 QF	7:04.30	4 SC/D	7:15.53	1 FC	7:03.97	15

Women

Athlete	Event	Heats		Quarterfinals		Semifinals		Final	
Athlete	Event	Time	Rank	Time	Rank	Time	Rank	Time	Rank
Gabriela Huerta; Lila Perez	Lightweight double sculls	7:11.71	4 R	7:41.97	4 FC	Bye		7:17.21	13

Qualification Legend: FA=Final A (medal); FB=Final B (non-medal); FC=Final C (non-medal); FD=Final D (non-medal); FE=Final E (non-medal); FF=Final F (non-medal); SA/B=Semifinals A/B; SC/D=Semifinals C/D; SE/F=Semifinals E/F; QF=Quarterfinals; R=Repechage

== Sailing ==
Men

Athlete	Event	Race											Net points	Final rank
Athlete	Event	1	2	3	4	5	6	7	8	9	10	M*	Net points	Final rank
David Mier	RS:X	16	5	17	6	12	~~29~~	23	22	4	25	EL	130	17

Women

Athlete	Event	Race											Net points	Final rank
Athlete	Event	1	2	3	4	5	6	7	8	9	10	M*	Net points	Final rank
Demita Vega	RS:X	23	23	25	25	17	21	20	19	19	~~26~~	EL	190	23
Tania Elías Calles	Laser Radial	27	25	~~29~~	13	15	16	7	3	1	CAN	EL	107	13

M = Medal race; EL = Eliminated – did not advance into the medal race; CAN = Race cancelled

== Shooting ==
Men

Athlete	Event	Qualification		Final	
Athlete	Event	Points	Rank	Points	Rank
Roberto José Elias	10 m air rifle	590	25	Did not advance	
Ariel Mauricio Flores	Skeet	111	27	Did not advance	
José Luis Sánchez	10 m air rifle	591	24	Did not advance	

Women

Athlete	Event	Qualification		Final	
Athlete	Event	Points	Rank	Points	Rank
Natalia Zamora	50 m rifle 3 positions	569	36	Did not advance	

== Swimming ==
Men

Athlete	Event	Heat		Semifinal		Final	
Athlete	Event	Time	Rank	Time	Rank	Time	Rank
Luis Escobar	10 km open water	—N/a				1:53:47.9	18
Juan Veloz	100 m butterfly	53.58	45	Did not advance			
Juan Veloz	200 m butterfly	1:57.32	23	Did not advance			

Women

Athlete	Event	Heat		Semifinal		Final	
Athlete	Event	Time	Rank	Time	Rank	Time	Rank
Susana Escobar	400 m freestyle	4:11.99	20	—N/a		Did not advance	
Susana Escobar	800 m freestyle	8:33.51	18	—N/a		Did not advance	
Susana Escobar	400 m individual medley	4:47.32	30	—N/a		Did not advance	
Fernanda González	100 m backstroke	1:02.76	35	Did not advance			
Fernanda González	200 m backstroke	2:14.64	28	Did not advance			
Adriana Marmolejo	100 m breaststroke	1:10.73 NR	31	Did not advance			
Adriana Marmolejo	200 m breaststroke	2:28.10 NR	22	Did not advance			
Imelda Martínez	10 km open water	—N/a				2:01:07.9	20

== Synchronized swimming ==
Athlete	Event	Technical routine		Free routine (preliminary)			Free routine (final)		
Athlete	Event	Points	Rank	Points	Total (technical + free)	Rank	Points	Total (technical + free)	Rank
Mariana Cifuentes; Isabel Delgado	Duet	42.334	19	42.834	85.168	19	Did not advance		

== Table tennis ==
Athlete	Event	Preliminary round	Round 1	Round 2	Round 3	Round 4	Quarterfinals	Semifinals	Final / BM	
Athlete	Event	Opposition Result	Opposition Result	Opposition Result	Opposition Result	Opposition Result	Opposition Result	Opposition Result	Opposition Result	Rank
Yadira Silva	Women's singles	Bakula (CRO); L 0–4	Did not advance							

== Taekwondo ==
Mexico wins its first gold medal in Taekwondo with the victory of Guillermo Perez.

Athlete	Event	Round of 16	Quarterfinals	Semifinals	Repechage	Bronze medal	Final	
Athlete	Event	Opposition Result	Opposition Result	Opposition Result	Opposition Result	Opposition Result	Opposition Result	Rank
Guillermo Pérez	Men's −58 kg	Harvey (GBR); W 3–2	Nikpai (AFG); W 2–1	Khawlaor (THA); W 3–1	Bye		Mercedes (DOM); W 1–1 SUP	1st place, gold medalist(s)
Idulio Islas	Men's −68 kg	Muhammad (NGR); L 2–2 SUP	Did not advance					
María del Rosario Espinoza	Women's +67 kg	Ben Hamza (TUN); W 4–0	Kedzierska (SWE); W 4–2	Stevenson (GBR); W 4–1	Bye		Solheim (NOR); W 3–1	1st place, gold medalist(s)

== Triathlon ==
Athlete	Event	Swim (1.5 km)	Trans 1	Bike (40 km)	Trans 2	Run (10 km)	Total Time	Rank
Francisco Serrano	Men's	18:56	0:26	58:08	0:34	36:42	1:54:46.09	44
Adriana Corona	Women's	21:16	0:29	Lapped				

== Volleyball ==
=== Beach ===
Athlete	Event	Preliminary round	Standing	Round of 16	Quarterfinals	Semifinals	Final / BM	
Athlete	Event	Opposition Score	Standing	Opposition Score	Opposition Score	Opposition Score	Opposition Score	Rank
Bibiana Candelas; Mayra García	Women's	Pool F Talita – Renata (BRA); L 1 – 2 (21–18, 16–21, 8–15); Arvaniti – Karantasiou (GRE); W 2 – 1 (21–17, 16–21, 15–12); D Schwaiger – S Schwaiger (AUT); L 0 – 2 (17–21, 10–21); Lucky Losers; Håkedal – Tørlen (NOR); L 1 – 2 (22–20, 12–21, 11–15)	3	Did not advance				

== Weightlifting ==
Athlete	Event	Snatch		Clean & jerk		Total	Rank
Athlete	Event	Result	Rank	Result	Rank	Total	Rank
Luz Mercedes Acosta	Women's −63 kg	103	=3	120	=7	223	7
Damaris Gabriela Aguirre	Women's −75 kg	109	8	136	6	245	3rd place, bronze medalist(s)

== Wrestling ==
Key:

- VT – Victory by Fall.
- PP – Decision by Points – the loser with technical points.
- PO – Decision by Points – the loser without technical points.

Men's freestyle

Athlete	Event	Qualification	Round of 16	Quarterfinal	Semifinal	Repechage 1	Repechage 2	Final / BM	
Athlete	Event	Opposition Result	Opposition Result	Opposition Result	Opposition Result	Opposition Result	Opposition Result	Opposition Result	Rank
Lawrence Langowski	−120 kg	Masoumi (IRI); L 0–3 ^{PO}	Did not advance						20

== See also ==
- Mexico at the 2007 Pan American Games
- Mexico at the 2008 Summer Paralympics
- Mexico at the 2010 Central American and Caribbean Games
