= Norway at the 2008 Summer Olympics =

- IOC code: NOR
- NOC: Norwegian Olympic Committee and Confederation of Sports
- Website: www.idrett.no (in Norwegian)

in Beijing
- Competitors: 85 in 15 sports
- Flag bearers: Ruth Kasirye (opening); Gro Hammerseng (closing)
- Medals Ranked 22nd: Gold 3 Silver 5 Bronze 1 Total 9

Summer Olympics appearances (overview)
- 1900; 1904; 1908; 1912; 1920; 1924; 1928; 1932; 1936; 1948; 1952; 1956; 1960; 1964; 1968; 1972; 1976; 1980; 1984; 1988; 1992; 1996; 2000; 2004; 2008; 2012; 2016; 2020; 2024

Other related appearances
- 1906 Intercalated Games

Norway competed at the 2008 Summer Olympics in Beijing, People's Republic of China.

On 10 June, the NOC selected 50 athletes for the Olympic Games. A week later, a further eight athletes were added. More selections were made on 17 June, 1 July, 14 July (a handball squad) and 17 July. A total of 85 participants were selected for the Olympics.

== Medalists ==
Medal	Name	Sport	Event	Date
Gold	Andreas Thorkildsen	Athletics	Men's javelin throw	23 August
Gold	Norway women's national handball team: Kari Aalvik Grimsbø; Katja Nyberg; Ragnhild Aamodt; Gøril Snorroeggen; Else Marthe Sørlie Lybekk; Tonje Nøstvold; Karoline Dyhre Breivang; Kristine Lunde; Gro Hammerseng; Kari Mette Johansen; Marit Malm Frafjord; Tonje Larsen; Katrine Lunde Haraldsen; Linn Kristin Riegelhuth	Handball	Women's tournament	23 August
Gold	Olaf Tufte	Rowing	Men's single sculls	16 August
Silver	Nina Solheim	Taekwondo	Women's +67 kg	23 August
Silver	Alexander Dale Oen	Swimming	Men's 100 m breaststroke	11 August
Silver	Tore Brovold	Shooting	Men's skeet	16 August
Silver	Kjersti Plätzer	Athletics	Women's 20 km walk	21 August
Silver	Eirik Verås Larsen	Canoeing	Men's K-1 1000 m	22 August
Bronze	Sara Nordenstam	Swimming	Women's 200 m breaststroke	15 August

== Athletics ==
Key

- Note–Ranks given for track events are within the athlete's heat only
- Q = Qualified for the next round
- q = Qualified for the next round as a fastest loser or, in field events, by position without achieving the qualifying target
- NR = National record
- N/A = Round not applicable for the event
- Bye = Athlete not required to compete in round

Men
Track & road events

Athlete	Event	Heat		Quarterfinal		Semifinal		Final	
Athlete	Event	Result	Rank	Result	Rank	Result	Rank	Result	Rank
Jaysuma Saidy Ndure	100 m	10.37	3 Q	10.14	4	Did not advance			
Jaysuma Saidy Ndure	200 m	20.54	2 Q	20.45	3 Q	DNS		Did not advance	
Trond Nymark	50 km walk	—						DNF	
Erik Tysse	20 km walk	—						1:22:43	21
Erik Tysse	50 km walk	—						3:45:21	5

Field events

Athlete	Event	Qualification		Final	
Athlete	Event	Distance	Position	Distance	Position
Andreas Thorkildsen	Javelin throw	79.85	9 Q	90.57 OR	1st place, gold medalist(s)

Women
Track & road events

Athlete	Event	Heat		Quarterfinal		Semifinal		Final	
Athlete	Event	Result	Rank	Result	Rank	Result	Rank	Result	Rank
Ezinne Okparaebo	100 m	11.32	2 Q	11.45	4	Did not advance			
Kirsten Melkevik Otterbu	Marathon	—						2:34:35	34
Kjersti Plätzer	20 km walk	—						1:27:07	2nd place, silver medalist(s)
Christina Vukicevic	100 m hurdles	13.05	4	—		Did not advance			

Combined events – Heptathlon

Athlete	Event	100H	HJ	SP	200 m	LJ	JT	800 m	Final	Rank
Ida Marcussen	Result	14.07	1.71	12.97	25.02	6.06	47.37	2:14.96	6015	21*
Ida Marcussen	Points	968	867	725	885	868	809	893	6015	21*

* The athlete who finished in second place, Lyudmila Blonska of Ukraine, tested positive for a banned substance. Both the A and the B tests were positive, therefore Blonska was stripped of her silver medal, and Marcussen moved up a position.

== Canoeing ==
=== Sprint ===
Athlete	Event	Heats		Semifinals		Final	
Athlete	Event	Time	Rank	Time	Rank	Time	Rank
Eirik Verås Larsen	Men's K-1 500 m	1:36.439	2 QS	1:41.927	2 Q	1:37.949	4
Eirik Verås Larsen	Men's K-1 1000 m	3:29.043	1 QF	Bye		3:27.342	2nd place, silver medalist(s)

Qualification Legend: QS = Qualify to semi-final; QF = Qualify directly to final

== Cycling ==
=== Road ===
Athlete	Event	Time	Rank
Kurt Asle Arvesen	Men's road race	6:26:17	32
Edvald Boasson Hagen	Men's road race	6:36:48	71
Lars Petter Nordhaug	Men's road race	Did not finish	
Gabriel Rasch	Men's road race	Did not finish	
Anita Valen de Vries	Women's road race	3:33:17	26

On 1 August, Thor Hushovd announced his withdrawal due to an illness, and was replaced by Nordhaug.

=== Mountain biking ===
Athlete	Event	Time	Rank
Lene Byberg	Women's cross-country	1:53:19	13
Gunn-Rita Dahle Flesjå	Women's cross-country	Did not finish	

=== BMX ===
Athlete	Event	Seeding		Quarterfinals		Semifinals		Final	
Athlete	Event	Result	Rank	Points	Rank	Points	Rank	Result	Rank
Sebastian Kartfjord	Men's BMX	38.688	30	19	8	Did not advance			

== Equestrian ==
=== Show jumping ===
Athlete	Horse	Event	Qualification								Final					Total	
Athlete	Horse	Event	Round 1		Round 2			Round 3			Round A		Round B			Total	
Athlete	Horse	Event	Penalties	Rank	Penalties	Total	Rank	Penalties	Total	Rank	Penalties	Rank	Penalties	Total	Rank	Penalties	Rank
Morten Djupvik	Casino	Individual	1	=14	12	13	33 Q	4	17	23 Q	4	11	4	8	7	8	10
Stein Endresen	Le Beau	Individual	0	=1	4	4	8 Q	12	16	18 Q	0	=1	16	16	18	16	16
Geir Gulliksen	Cattani	Individual	13	65	12	25	51	Did not advance								25	51
Tony André Hansen	Camiro 19	Individual	1	=14	1	2	4 Q	1	3	1 Q	Withdrew						
Morten Djupvik; Stein Endresen; Geir Gulliksen; Tony André Hansen	See above	Team	—								28	10	21	49	10	~~49~~	DSQ*

* Tony André Hansen's horse Camiro tested positive for the pain relieving medication capsaicin, a banned substance. Hansen was later disqualified. Without Hansen's score, the team was below the threshold to advance to round 2 of the finals. Therefore, the bronze medal was stripped and awarded to the team from Switzerland.

== Fencing ==
Men

Athlete	Event	Round of 64	Round of 32	Round of 16	Quarterfinal	Semifinal	Final / BM	
Athlete	Event	Opposition Score	Opposition Score	Opposition Score	Opposition Score	Opposition Score	Opposition Score	Rank
Sturla Torkildsen	Individual épée	Mejías (VEN); W 12–11	Tagliariol (ITA); L 10–15	Did not advance				

== Football ==
The men's under-21 team failed to qualify after drawing with Bosnia-Herzegovina and losing to Armenia in the first qualifying stage. Meanwhile, the women's team qualified for the Olympics after placing in the semi-final round at the 2007 FIFA Women's World Cup.

=== Women's tournament ===
Roster

Head coach: Bjarne Berntsen

Norway named a squad of 18 players and 4 alternates for the tournament.

No.	Pos.	Player	Date of birth (age)	Caps	Goals	Club
1	GK	Erika Skarbø	12 June 1987 (aged 21)	7	0	(Norway) Arna-Bjørnar Fotball
2	DF	Ane Stangeland Horpestad (captain)	2 June 1980 (aged 28)	100	5	(Norway) Klepp IL
3	DF	Gunhild Følstad	3 November 1981 (aged 26)	69	1	(Norway) Trondheims-Ørn SK
4	MF	Ingvild Stensland	3 August 1981 (aged 27)	68	2	(Sweden) Kopparbergs/Göteborg FC
5	DF	Siri Nordby	4 August 1978 (aged 30)	38	1	(Norway) Røa IL
6	MF	Marie Knutsen	31 August 1982 (aged 25)	48	5	(Norway) Røa IL
7	DF	Trine Rønning	14 June 1982 (aged 26)	83	15	(Norway) Kolbotn Fotball
8	FW	Solveig Gulbrandsen	12 January 1981 (aged 27)	121	39	(Norway) Kolbotn Fotball
9	FW	Isabell Herlovsen	23 June 1988 (aged 20)	35	5	(Norway) Kolbotn Fotball
10	FW	Melissa Wiik	7 February 1985 (aged 23)	30	12	(Norway) Asker SK
11	FW	Leni Larsen Kaurin	21 March 1981 (aged 27)	44	3	(Germany) 1. FFC Turbine Potsdam
12	DF	Marit Fiane Christensen	11 December 1980 (aged 27)	58	7	(Norway) Røa IL
13	MF	Lene Storløkken	20 June 1981 (aged 27)	34	5	(Norway) Team Strømmen FK
14	FW	Guro Knutsen	10 January 1985 (aged 23)	8	1	(Norway) Røa IL
15	DF	Marita Skammelsrud Lund	29 January 1989 (aged 19)	7	0	(Norway) Team Strømmen FK
16	FW	Elise Thorsnes	14 August 1988 (aged 19)	16	1	(Norway) Arna-Bjørnar Fotball
17	FW	Lene Mykjåland	20 February 1987 (aged 21)	18	5	(Norway) Røa IL
18	GK	Christine Colombo Nilsen	30 April 1982 (aged 26)	5	0	(Norway) Kolbotn Fotball

Group play

Pos	Team	Pld	W	D	L	GF	GA	GD	Pts	Qualification
1	United States	3	2	0	1	5	2	+3	6	Qualified for the quarterfinals
2	Norway	3	2	0	1	4	5	−1	6	Qualified for the quarterfinals
3	Japan	3	1	1	1	7	4	+3	4	Qualified for the quarterfinals
4	New Zealand	3	0	1	2	2	7	−5	1	

6 August 2008
19:45

Norway	2–0	United States
Larsen Kaurin 2'; Wiik 4'	Report

Qinhuangdao Olympic Sports Center Stadium, Qinhuangdao
Attendance: 17,673
Referee: Nicole Petignat (Switzerland)
9 August 2008
19:45

New Zealand	0–1	Norway
	Report	Wiik 8'

Qinhuangdao Olympic Sports Center Stadium, Qinhuangdao
Attendance: 7,285
Referee: Estela Alvarez (Argentina)
12 August 2008
19:45

Norway	1–5	Japan
Knutsen 27'	Report	Kinga 31'; Følstad 51' (o.g.); Ohno 52'; Sawa 71'; Hara 83'

Shanghai Stadium, Shanghai
Attendance: 16,872
Referee: Shane de Silva (Trinidad and Tobago)

== Handball ==
The women's team qualified due to winning the European Championships.

=== Women's tournament ===
Roster

The following is the Norway roster in the women's handball tournament of the 2008 Summer Olympics.

Head coach: Marit Breivik

No.	Pos.	Name	Date of birth (age)	Height	App.	Goals	Club
1	GK	Kari Aalvik Grimsbø	4 January 1985 (aged 23)	1.80 m	30	0	(Norway) Byåsen IL
3	LB	Katja Nyberg	24 August 1979 (aged 28)	1.83 m	92	304	(Denmark) Ikast-Bording EH
4	RW	Ragnhild Aamodt	9 September 1980 (aged 27)	1.63 m	111	276	(Denmark) Ikast-Bording EH
5	LB	Gøril Snorroeggen	15 February 1985 (aged 23)	1.78 m	60	151	(Norway) Byåsen IL
6	P	Else Marthe Sørlie Lybekk	11 September 1978 (aged 29)	1.78 m	207	567	(Norway) Nordstrand IF
7	RB	Tonje Nøstvold	7 May 1985 (aged 23)	1.78 m	73	140	(Denmark) Ikast-Bording EH
8	RB	Karoline Dyhre Breivang	10 May 1980 (aged 28)	1.73 m	147	282	(Norway) Larvik HK
9	LB	Kristine Lunde	30 March 1980 (aged 28)	1.83 m	110	349	(Denmark) Viborg HK
10	CB	Gro Hammerseng	10 April 1980 (aged 28)	1.80 m	139	559	(Denmark) Ikast-Bording EH
11	LW	Kari Mette Johansen	11 January 1979 (aged 29)	1.73 m	103	280	(Norway) Larvik HK
13	P	Marit Malm Frafjord	25 November 1986 (aged 21)	1.83 m	53	111	(Norway) Byåsen IL
14	LB	Tonje Larsen	26 January 1975 (aged 33)	1.83 m	220	453	(Norway) Larvik HK
16	GK	Katrine Lunde Haraldsen	30 March 1980 (aged 28)	1.80 m	111	1	(Denmark) Viborg HK
18	RB	Linn Kristin Riegelhuth	1 August 1984 (aged 24)	1.75 m	105	363	(Norway) Larvik HK

Group play

Team	Pld	W	D	L	GF	GA	GD	Pts	Qualification
Norway	5	5	0	0	154	106	+48	10	Qualified for the quarterfinals
Romania	5	4	0	1	150	112	+38	8	Qualified for the quarterfinals
China	5	2	0	3	122	135	−13	4	Qualified for the quarterfinals
France	5	2	0	3	121	128	−7	4	Qualified for the quarterfinals
Kazakhstan	5	1	1	3	109	137	−28	3	
Angola	5	0	1	4	109	147	−38	1	

9 August 2008; 19:00	Norway	30 – 23	China	Olympic Sports Centre Gymnasium; Referees: Elmoamli, Shaban Ali (EGY)
9 August 2008; 19:00	Hammerseng 7	(13–12)	Li Weiwei 8	Olympic Sports Centre Gymnasium; Referees: Elmoamli, Shaban Ali (EGY)
9 August 2008; 19:00	3× (yellow card) 5× (suspension)	Report	3× (yellow card) 7× (suspension)	Olympic Sports Centre Gymnasium; Referees: Elmoamli, Shaban Ali (EGY)

11 August 2008; 14:00	Angola	17 – 31	Norway	Olympic Sports Centre Gymnasium; Referees: Liu S, Liu F (CHN)
11 August 2008; 14:00	Almeida 5	(6–14)	Riegelhuth 6	Olympic Sports Centre Gymnasium; Referees: Liu S, Liu F (CHN)
11 August 2008; 14:00	3× (yellow card) 3× (suspension)	Report	3× (yellow card) 2× (suspension)	Olympic Sports Centre Gymnasium; Referees: Liu S, Liu F (CHN)

13 August 2008; 19:00	Norway	35 – 19	Kazakhstan	Olympic Sports Centre Gymnasium; Referees: Aires Menezes, Aparecido Pinto (BRA)
13 August 2008; 19:00	Lybekk, Nyberg 5	(14–10)	Vassilyeva 6	Olympic Sports Centre Gymnasium; Referees: Aires Menezes, Aparecido Pinto (BRA)
13 August 2008; 19:00	3× (yellow card) 3× (suspension)	Report	3× (yellow card) 5× (suspension)	Olympic Sports Centre Gymnasium; Referees: Aires Menezes, Aparecido Pinto (BRA)

15 August 2008; 19:00	France	24 – 34	Norway	Olympic Sports Centre Gymnasium; Referees: Krstic, Ljubic (SLO)
15 August 2008; 19:00	Baudouin 6	(12–15)	Nyberg, Riegelhuth 6	Olympic Sports Centre Gymnasium; Referees: Krstic, Ljubic (SLO)
15 August 2008; 19:00	3× (yellow card) 4× (suspension)	Report	3× (yellow card) 3× (suspension)	Olympic Sports Centre Gymnasium; Referees: Krstic, Ljubic (SLO)

17 August 2008; 14:00	Norway	24 – 23	Romania	Olympic Sports Centre Gymnasium; Referees: Chernega, Poladenko (RUS)
17 August 2008; 14:00	Johansen, Lybekk 4	(12–11)	Amariei, Stanca-Gâlcă 5	Olympic Sports Centre Gymnasium; Referees: Chernega, Poladenko (RUS)
17 August 2008; 14:00	2× (yellow card) 4× (suspension)	Report	4× (yellow card) 6× (suspension) 1× (red card)	Olympic Sports Centre Gymnasium; Referees: Chernega, Poladenko (RUS)

Quarterfinal

19 August 2008; 12:00	Norway	31 – 24	Sweden	Olympic Sports Centre Gymnasium; Referees: Baum, Goralczyk (POL)
19 August 2008; 12:00	Larsen, Lybekk 6	(16–10)	Torstenson 6	Olympic Sports Centre Gymnasium; Referees: Baum, Goralczyk (POL)
19 August 2008; 12:00	3× (yellow card) 4× (suspension)	Report	4× (yellow card) 2× (suspension)	Olympic Sports Centre Gymnasium; Referees: Baum, Goralczyk (POL)

Semifinal

21 August 2008; 18:00	Norway	29 – 28	South Korea	Beijing National Indoor Stadium; Referees: Breto, Huelin (ESP)
21 August 2008; 18:00	Hammerseng, Johansen 6	(14–15)	Moon Pil-hee 9	Beijing National Indoor Stadium; Referees: Breto, Huelin (ESP)
21 August 2008; 18:00	2× (yellow card) 3× (suspension)	Report	3× (yellow card) 2× (suspension)	Beijing National Indoor Stadium; Referees: Breto, Huelin (ESP)

Gold medal game

23 August 2008; 15:45	Norway	34 – 27	Russia	Beijing National Indoor Stadium; Referees: Bord, Buy (FRA)
23 August 2008; 15:45	Riegelhuth 9	(18–13)	Bliznova 6	Beijing National Indoor Stadium; Referees: Bord, Buy (FRA)
23 August 2008; 15:45	3× (yellow card) 3× (suspension)	Report	2× (yellow card) 2× (suspension)	Beijing National Indoor Stadium; Referees: Bord, Buy (FRA)

Final rank

Gold

== Rowing ==
Men

Athlete	Event	Heats		Quarterfinals		Semifinals		Final	
Athlete	Event	Time	Rank	Time	Rank	Time	Rank	Time	Rank
Olaf Tufte	Single sculls	7:20.20	1 QF	6:53.59	1 SA/B	6:58.23	2 FA	6:59.83	1st place, gold medalist(s)

Qualification Legend: FA=Final A (medal); FB=Final B (non-medal); FC=Final C (non-medal); FD=Final D (non-medal); FE=Final E (non-medal); FF=Final F (non-medal); SA/B=Semifinals A/B; SC/D=Semifinals C/D; SE/F=Semifinals E/F; QF=Quarterfinals; R=Repechage

== Sailing ==
Men

Athlete	Event	Race											Net points	Final rank
Athlete	Event	1	2	3	4	5	6	7	8	9	10	M*	Net points	Final rank
Kristian Ruth	Laser	10	11	17	10	3	8	13	21	~~38~~	CAN	16	109	10

Women

Athlete	Event	Race											Net points	Final rank
Athlete	Event	1	2	3	4	5	6	7	8	9	10	M*	Net points	Final rank
Jannicke Stålstrøm	RS:X	7	~~DSQ~~	2	12	9	10	15	13	21	18	EL	117	15
Cathrine Gjerpen	Laser Radial	26	27	24	27	23	~~28~~	23	27	25	CAN	EL	202	28
Lise Birgitte Frederiksen; Alexandra Koefoed; Siren Sundby	Yngling	12	~~13~~	5	1	3	13	12	11	CAN	CAN	7	71	9

Open

Athlete	Event	Race																Score	Rank
Athlete	Event	1	2	3	4	5	6	7	8	9	10	11	12	13	14	15	M	Score	Rank
Peer Moberg	Finn	23	~~DSQ~~	11	19	22	1	DSQ	4	CAN	CAN	—					EL	107	19
Frode Bovim; Christopher Gundersen	49er	11	13	18	7	10	8	14	11	13	~~19~~	12	11	CAN	CAN	CAN	EL	128	13

M = Medal race; EL = Eliminated – did not advance into the medal race; CAN = Race cancelled

== Shooting ==
Men

Athlete	Event	Qualification		Final	
Athlete	Event	Points	Rank	Points	Rank
Vebjørn Berg	10 m air rifle	592	22	Did not advance	
Vebjørn Berg	50 m rifle prone	596	3 Q	699.1	4
Vebjørn Berg	50 m rifle 3 positions	1172	5 Q	1266.5	8
Espen Berg-Knutsen	50 m rifle prone	594	11	Did not advance	
Espen Berg-Knutsen	50 m rifle 3 positions	1160	30	Did not advance	
Tore Brovold	Skeet	120	2 Q	145 S/O 3	2nd place, silver medalist(s)
Are Hansen	10 m air rifle	592	19	Did not advance	
Harald Jensen	Skeet	118	12	Did not advance	

Women

Athlete	Event	Qualification		Final	
Athlete	Event	Points	Rank	Points	Rank
Gyda Ellefsplass Olssen	10 m air rifle	391	34	Did not advance	
Gyda Ellefsplass Olssen	50 m rifle 3 positions	575	27	Did not advance	
Kristina Vestveit	10 m air rifle	395	14	Did not advance	
Kristina Vestveit	50 m rifle 3 positions	573	29	Did not advance	

The Norwegian Shooting Federation had suggested selecting Ingrid Stubsjøen for the team, but the Norwegian National Olympic Committee selected Vestveit instead after good performances in the final World Cup event of the 2008 season.

== Swimming ==
Alexander Dale Oen won Norway's first ever swimming medal at the Olympics.

Men

Athlete	Event	Heat		Semifinal		Final	
Athlete	Event	Time	Rank	Time	Rank	Time	Rank
Gard Kvale	200 m freestyle	1:48.73 NR	27	Did not advance			
Gard Kvale	400 m freestyle	3:50.47	26	—		Did not advance	
Gard Kvale	200 m individual medley	2:01.52 NR	25	Did not advance			
Alexander Dale Oen	100 m breaststroke	59.41 OR	1 Q	59.16 OR	1 Q	59.20	2nd place, silver medalist(s)
Alexander Dale Oen	200 m breaststroke	2:11.30	17	Did not advance			

Women

Athlete	Event	Heat		Semifinal		Final	
Athlete	Event	Time	Rank	Time	Rank	Time	Rank
Sara Nordenstam	200 m breaststroke	2.24.47 NR	4 Q	2:23.79 EU	4 Q	2:23.02 EU	3rd place, bronze medalist(s)
Sara Nordenstam	200 m individual medley	2:15.13 NR	23	Did not advance			
Sara Nordenstam	400 m individual medley	4:40.28 NR	18	—		Did not advance	
Ingvild Snildal	100 m butterfly	59.86 NR	27	Did not advance			
Ingvild Snildal	200 m butterfly	2:14.53	33	Did not advance			

== Taekwondo ==
Athlete	Event	Round of 16	Quarterfinals	Semifinals	Repechage	Bronze Medal	Final	
Athlete	Event	Opposition Result	Opposition Result	Opposition Result	Opposition Result	Opposition Result	Opposition Result	Rank
Nina Solheim	Women's +67 kg	Abd Rabo (EGY); W 9–3	Che C C (MAS); W 3–1	Falavigna (BRA); W 2–2 SUP	Bye		Espinoza (MEX); L 1–3	2nd place, silver medalist(s)

== Volleyball ==
=== Beach ===
Athlete	Event	Preliminary round	Standing	Round of 16	Quarterfinals	Semifinals	Final / BM	
Athlete	Event	Opposition Score	Standing	Opposition Score	Opposition Score	Opposition Score	Opposition Score	Rank
Jørre Kjemperud; Tarjei Skarlund	Men's	Pool E Klemperer – Koreng (GER); L 1 – 2 (21–19, 20–22, 7–15); Nummerdor – Schuil (NED); L 1 – 2 (21–13, 15–21, 9–15); Laciga – Schnider (SUI); L 0 – 2 (17–21, 13–21)	4	Did not advance				
Susanne Glesnes; Kathrine Maaseide	Women's	Pool B Mouha – van Breedam (BEL); W 2 – 0 (24–22, 21–18); Kuhn – Schwer (SUI); W 2 – 0 (21–11, 21–17); Tian J – Wang J (CHN); L 1 – 2 (21–17, 14–21, 8–15)	2 Q	Talita – Renata (BRA); L 1 – 2 (21–12, 19–21, 13–15)	Did not advance			
Nila Håkedal; Ingrid Tørlen	Women's	Pool A Fernández – Peraza (CUB); L 0 – 2 (20–22, 19–21) Kusuhara – Teru Saiki (JPN); W 2 – 0 (21–8, 21–18); May-Treanor – Walsh (USA); L 0 – 2 (12–21, 15–21); Lucky Loser; Candelas – García (MEX); W 2 – 1 (20–22, 21–12, 15–11)	3 Q	Tian J – Wang J (CHN); L 0 – 2 (13–21, 15–21)	Did not advance			

== Weightlifting ==
Athlete	Event	Snatch		Clean & Jerk		Total	Rank
Athlete	Event	Result	Rank	Result	Rank	Total	Rank
Ruth Kasirye	Women's −63 kg	103	3	121	7	224	6

== Wrestling ==
Key:

- VT – Victory by Fall.
- PP – Decision by Points – the loser with technical points.
- PO – Decision by Points – the loser without technical points.

Men's Greco-Roman

Athlete	Event	Qualification	Round of 16	Quarterfinal	Semifinal	Repechage 1	Repechage 2	Final / BM	
Athlete	Event	Opposition Result	Opposition Result	Opposition Result	Opposition Result	Opposition Result	Opposition Result	Opposition Result	Rank
Stig André Berge	−60 kg	Bye	Tengizbayev (KAZ); L 0–3 ^{PO}	Did not advance					19

== See also ==
- Norway at the 2008 Summer Paralympics
