= 2009 World Taekwondo Championships – Women's heavyweight =

Taekwondo competition

Women's heavyweight at the 2009 World Championships
- Venue: Ballerup Super Arena
- Dates: 18 October 2009
- Competitors: 37 from 37 nations

Medalists
| gold medal | Rosana Simón | Spain |
| silver medal | Liu Rui | China |
| bronze medal | Jo Seol | South Korea |
| bronze medal | Natália Falavigna | Brazil |

The women's heavyweight competition at the 2009 World Taekwondo Championships was held at the Ballerup Super Arena in Copenhagen, Denmark on October 18. Heavyweights were over 73 kilograms in body mass.

== Results ==
Legend

- DQ — Won by disqualification
- WD — Won by withdrawal

=== Finals ===
| Semifinals | | Final |
| Liu Rui (CHN) | 3 |
| Jo Seol (KOR) | 3 | Liu Rui (CHN) | 4 |
| Rosana Simón (ESP) | 3 | Rosana Simón (ESP) | 6 |
| Natália Falavigna (BRA) | 2 |

=== Top half ===
==== Section 1 ====
Round of 64
~~Yamundow Jobe (GAM)~~
Fatou Seck (SEN) | DQ

Round of 32
Wiam Dislam (MAR) | 16
Fatou Seck (SEN) | 0
Liu Rui (CHN) | DQ
~~Soheila Sayyahi (IRI)~~
Kyriaki Kouvari (GRE) | 0
Teresa Guevara (VEN) | 0
Lydia Nieves (PUR) | 3
Karolina Kedzierska (SWE) | 9

Round of 16
Wiam Dislam (MAR) | 4
Liu Rui (CHN) | 6
Kyriaki Kouvari (GRE) | 3
Karolina Kedzierska (SWE) | 2

Quarterfinals
Liu Rui (CHN) | 8
Kyriaki Kouvari (GRE) | 2

==== Section 2 ====
Round of 64
Jo Seol (KOR) | 1
Burcu Sallakoğlu (TUR) | 0
Nadin Dawani (JOR) | 6
Linda Azzeddine (ALG) | 1

Round of 32
Evgeniya Karimova (UZB) | 1
Jo Seol (KOR) | 6
Wang Junnan (MAC) | 2
Ruth Rowe (AUS) | 0
~~Laurence Rase (BEL)~~
Bianca Walkden (GBR) | DQ
Nadin Dawani (JOR) | 4
Noha Abd Rabo (EGY) | 5

Round of 16
Jo Seol (KOR) | 5
Wang Junnan (MAC) | 2
Bianca Walkden (GBR) | 2
Noha Abd Rabo (EGY) | 1

Quarterfinals
Jo Seol (KOR) | 3
Bianca Walkden (GBR) | 0

=== Bottom half ===
==== Section 3 ====
Round of 64
Dragica Munćan (SRB) | 0
Anne-Caroline Graffe (FRA) | 3

Round of 32
Rosana Simón (ESP) | 6
Anne-Caroline Graffe (FRA) | 1
~~Lispa Mwangi (KEN)~~ | DQ
~~Taiye Lateef (NGR)~~ | DQ
~~Veera Basavaiah (IND)~~
Lorena Díaz (COL) | DQ
Lauren Cahoon (USA) | 0
Irina Bykova (RUS) | 0

Round of 16
Rosana Simón (ESP)
Bye
Lorena Díaz (COL) | 0
Lauren Cahoon (USA) | 2

Quarterfinals
Rosana Simón (ESP) | 8
Lauren Cahoon (USA) | 0

==== Section 4 ====
Round of 64
~~Amelia Corbie (TRI)~~
Ivana Žagar (CRO) | DQ

Round of 32
Graciella Mourambou (GAB) | 0
Tsui Fang-hsuan (TPE) | 7
Maima Samau (SAM)
Guadalupe Ruiz (MEX) | WD
Daria Peregoudova (CAN) | 2
Maryna Konieva (UKR) | 0
Ivana Žagar (CRO) | 1
Natália Falavigna (BRA) | 2

Round of 16
Tsui Fang-hsuan (TPE) | 6
Guadalupe Ruiz (MEX) | 2
Daria Peregoudova (CAN) | 0
Natália Falavigna (BRA) | 1

Quarterfinals
Tsui Fang-hsuan (TPE) | 0
Natália Falavigna (BRA) | 0
