= Taekwondo at the 2008 Summer Olympics =

Taekwondo at the Games of the XXIX Olympiad
- Venue: Beijing Science and Technology University Gymnasium
- Dates: August 20 to August 23, 2008
- Competitors: 128

The event of Taekwondo competitions at the 2008 Summer Olympics was held in Beijing. It was held between August 20th and August 23rd at the Beijing Science and Technology University Gymnasium. The event consisted of various athletes, there were 128 Taekwondo practitioners, consisting of 64 men and 64 women. These athletes competed in 8 events, where for the first time ever, two bronze medals were awarded per event.

The highlight of the 2008 Summer Olympics were the top 3 Men Taekwondo medalists, which are: Guillermo Perez from Mexico, Yulis Gabriel Mercedes from Dominica Republic, and Mu-Yen Chu from Taipei. The top 3 Women Taekwondo medalists are: Jingyu Wu from China, Buttree Puedpong from Thailand, and Dalia Contreras Rivero from Venezuela.

== Competition format ==
The taekwondo competition at the Olympic Games consists of a single elimination tournament. A change has been made as the IOC decided to award two bronze medals in the Beijing 2008 Olympics. However, the repechage system will be maintained and the difference will be that both winners of the respective repechage matches will receive a bronze medal.

Taekwondo competitions should be held between contestants of the same gender and weight division. Taekwondo competition involves a mat of 8 meters squared serves as the competitive arena. Taekwondo fights go three rounds of two minutes each, with a one-minute break in between. Each fighter aims to strike or score points by striking their rival in the body or head. Kicks to the torso and head are permitted, whereas punches are only allowed to the body. However, a target below the waist is not allowed.

Penalties are a way for fighters to lose points. These can be caused by things like: A punch in the face; Using the knee to attack; Attacking the area below the waistline; Stepping both feet out of the ring; Turning away from your adversary; Faking illness. The fighter who strikes down their opponent or scores the most points at the end of the three rounds wins the match. If the fight ends in a tie, a golden point round is held, with the combatant who scores the first point considered the winner.

== Medal summary ==
South Korea ranks first place in this competition by winning 4 gold medals in the 4 events they participated. Hadi Saei was a repeated champion, alongside Steven López, who were the only 2 Taekwondo practitioners that won medals in a streak of 3 Olympics. Next on the winning board were Chu Mu-Yen and Alexandros Nikolaidis, who also won a medal for the second time. History was made when Rohullah Nikpai became the first Afghan Olympics medalist during this event. Conclusively, Sarah Stevenson lastly won a medal in her third Olympics appearance, eliminating two-time gold medalist Chen Zhong in an unprecedented result overturn.

=== Men's events ===
Event	Gold	Silver	Bronze
Flyweight (58 kg)	Guillermo Pérez; Mexico	Yulis Gabriel Mercedes; Dominican Republic	Rohullah Nikpai; Afghanistan
Flyweight (58 kg)	Guillermo Pérez; Mexico	Yulis Gabriel Mercedes; Dominican Republic	Chu Mu-Yen; Chinese Taipei
Lightweight (68 kg)	Son Tae-jin; South Korea	Mark Lopez; United States	Servet Tazegül; Turkey
Lightweight (68 kg)	Son Tae-jin; South Korea	Mark Lopez; United States	Sung Yu-Chi; Chinese Taipei
Middleweight (80 kg)	Hadi Saei; Iran	Mauro Sarmiento; Italy	Zhu Guo; China
Middleweight (80 kg)	Hadi Saei; Iran	Mauro Sarmiento; Italy	Steven López; United States
Heavyweight (+80 kg)	Cha Dong-Min; South Korea	Alexandros Nikolaidis; Greece	Chika Chukwumerije; Nigeria
Heavyweight (+80 kg)	Cha Dong-Min; South Korea	Alexandros Nikolaidis; Greece	Arman Chilmanov; Kazakhstan

=== Women's events ===
Event	Gold	Silver	Bronze
Flyweight (49 kg)	Wu Jingyu; China	Buttree Puedpong; Thailand	Daynellis Montejo; Cuba
Flyweight (49 kg)	Wu Jingyu; China	Buttree Puedpong; Thailand	Dalia Contreras; Venezuela
Lightweight (57 kg)	Lim Su-Jeong; South Korea	Azize Tanrıkulu; Turkey	Diana López; United States
Lightweight (57 kg)	Lim Su-Jeong; South Korea	Azize Tanrıkulu; Turkey	Martina Zubčić; Croatia
Middleweight (67 kg)	Hwang Kyung-Seon; South Korea	Karine Sergerie; Canada	Gwladys Épangue; France
Middleweight (67 kg)	Hwang Kyung-Seon; South Korea	Karine Sergerie; Canada	Sandra Šarić; Croatia
Heavyweight (+67 kg)	María del Rosario Espinoza; Mexico	Nina Solheim; Norway	Sarah Stevenson; Great Britain
Heavyweight (+67 kg)	María del Rosario Espinoza; Mexico	Nina Solheim; Norway	Natália Falavigna; Brazil

=== Medal table ===
* Host nation (China)

Rank	Nation	Gold	Silver	Bronze	Total
1	South Korea	4	0	0	4
2	Mexico	2	0	0	2
3	China*	1	0	1	2
4	Iran	1	0	0	1
5	United States	0	1	2	3
6	Turkey	0	1	1	2
7	Canada	0	1	0	1
7	Dominican Republic	0	1	0	1
7	Greece	0	1	0	1
7	Italy	0	1	0	1
7	Norway	0	1	0	1
7	Thailand	0	1	0	1
13	Chinese Taipei	0	0	2	2
13	Croatia	0	0	2	2
15	Afghanistan	0	0	1	1
15	Brazil	0	0	1	1
15	Cuba	0	0	1	1
15	France	0	0	1	1
15	Great Britain	0	0	1	1
15	Kazakhstan	0	0	1	1
15	Nigeria	0	0	1	1
15	Venezuela	0	0	1	1
Totals (22 entries)		8	8	16	32

== Flagbearers ==
There are a large number of Taekwondo practitioners who took the pride of carrying their nation's flag in the ceremony, which are the following: Daba Modibo Keita of Mali, Deepak Bista of Nepal, Sheikha Maitha Al Maktoum of United Arab Emirates, Nesar Ahmad Bahave of Afghanistan, Miguel Ferrera of Honduras & Bineta Diedhiou of Senegal

== Incident ==
Amongst many controversies in the 2008 Summer Olympics, a terrorist incident was one of them.

On 10 April 2008, China claimed to have disrupted a terror plot to kidnap athletes, journalists, and tourists during the August Olympics in Beijing by Uyghur separatists. Reports have said that these terrorists were planning suicide bombings and kidnapping activities to destroy the Olympic Games.

In the northwestern Xinjiang province, the security ministry had reported 35 arrests and being bombs confiscated in recent weeks. Police uncovered another conspiracy based in Xinjiang to disrupt the Games in January, after the 2008 Summer Olympics.

Chinese officials had already turned Beijing into a massive fortress in preparation for any attack: surface-to-air missiles were fired at the skies above the Olympic venues. On light poles, surveillance cameras scanned the walkways. Thousands of automobiles and trucks were also searched by police as they entered the city. Ordinary citizens were urged to help their native land: thousands of middle-aged and elderly locals, many of whom were dressed in red armbands evocative of the ardent Red Guard youngsters of decades prior, patrolled the neighborhoods.

Beijing's latest security measures included increased inspection of Muslim gathering spots: following the Kunming bomb seizure in late July, police officers were observed seated across from a mosque in Beijing's Russian neighbourhood. After numerous inspections from authorities citing health issues, the proprietor of the Xinjiang Kashgar Restaurant near a major Olympic site had closed his restaurant down: many other Muslim eateries in the area had attracted similar inspections.

== Controversies ==
=== Result overturning ===
On August 23, the quarterfinal match in the Women's +67 kg between Sarah Stevenson of Great Britain and China's Chen Zhong, the defending gold medalist from Sydney and Athens, was plagued with controversy. Chen Zhong had led 1-0 through most of the match. However, 4 seconds before the end, Sarah Stevenson landed a clear strike to the face of her opponent. Nevertheless, only half of the judges recorded the hit and thus was not registered, dashing Stevenson's Olympic hopes of gaining her the two points that would have secured her a quick victory. Stevenson's coach was seen to be agitated, which lead the coach to protest to the referee and judges, but initially, Zhong was awarded the match. The British team protested for over an hour based on the video footage, it was seen that there was a mishap of the strike to the face, unprecedently in the sport of Taekwondo, much to the crowd's dislike, the judges' decision was repealed. In the course of time, it was Stevenson who went through to the semi-finals against the Mexican María del Rosario Espinoza. Espinoza, however, secured a clear victory over the unprepared Stevenson and went on to win gold, whilst Stevenson took bronze in the bronze medal match against the Egyptian Noha Abd Rabo.

On announcing the change of result in the quarter-final, the tournament director said:

The competition supervisory board has looked into this matter deeply, has made video analysis which has been open to all the referees and judges. In applying paragraph two of page 64 of the competition rules of the World Taekwondo Federation we have to change this result and we have to declare the British player as the winner. "We are very sorry to the spectators of China but justice is first. Thank you for understanding."

=== Match-fixing allegations ===
Canadian medal hopeful, Ivett Gonda, lost 2–0 to Sweden's Hanna Zajc on the first day of the competition despite Ivett's visible domination of the match. Her coach speculated that it is possible that the judge's scoring machines were possibly broken. He also speculated that another reason could be that the Chinese judge wanted to prevent Gonda from facing the Chinese competitor in the next round (who later easily beat Zajc on her way to the medal).

A protest was sent out and was subsequently denied. Many coaches, not only the Canadian coach, were shocked at the loss.

=== Referee assault ===
The bronze medal match in the men's 80+ kg class saw the gold medallist from Sydney 2000, Ángel Matos, against Kazakhstan's Arman Chilmanov. After he incurred an injury in the second round of the fight while leading the match 3–2, he subsequently took a Kyeshi. Under World Taekwondo Federation tournament rules, injured competitors are allowed one minute of Kyeshi time, at the end of which the competitor in question must return to the center of the ring to resume the fight, request further time, or forfeit the match. Swedish referee Chakir Chelbat gave a time warning at 40 seconds, but when Kyeshi elapsed without Matos returning to the center, Chelbat ruled Matos had retired.

"To me it was obvious he was unable to continue," Chilmanov told reporters. "His toe on his left foot was broken." After Chilmanov was declared the winner, Matos briefly argued with Chelbat before kicking him in the face, drawing blood from the mouth, then punched a judge in the arm and spat on the arena floor before he and his coach, Leudis González, were escorted from the arena by security. Given alleged poor judging during the Olympics, which left many competitors raging in injustice, the crowd watching the event chanted "Cuba" and applauded Matos and his coach as they were removed from the arena.

Coach Leudis González said of the referee's initial decision to end the fight, "He was too strict...", and claimed the fight was fixed.

A statement released by the WTF referred to the incident as a "strong violation of the spirit of taekwondo and the Olympic Games". The WTF ordered all of Matos's results from the 2008 Olympics to be deleted from the records, and banned Matos and González from WTF sanctioned events permanently.

Fidel Castro defended Matos by saying that he was rightfully indignant over his disqualification from the bronze-medal match. "I saw when the judges blatantly stole fights from two Cuban boxers in the semifinals," Castro wrote. "Our fighters ... had hopes of winning, despite the judges, but it was useless. They were condemned beforehand."

Great Britain's postal service Royal Mail released a stamp in 2010 commemorating taekwondo's inclusion in the London 2012 Olympic Games, and it is debated that the illustration may be based on a widely circulated photo of Ángel Matos kicking referee Chakir Chelbat.

=== Allegations of mismanagement and intimidation ===
An incident in the men's 80 kg competition may prove to have a more lasting impact on the sport. American Steven López, the two-time defending gold medalist in that class who had not lost a match since 2002, had one point taken away by the referee in the third period of his quarterfinal match against Italy's Mauro Sarmiento. The referee determined that Lopez had used an illegal "cut kick" (blocked an opponent's blow below the waist). The deduction turned Lopez's 2–1 lead into a 1–1 tie, resulting in Lopez's loss during the sudden-death overtime. Team USA's team leader, Herb Perez, unsuccessfully protested the decision, asserting that Lopez had raised his left leg in defense and Sarmiento had kicked into the leg in an attempt to draw the deduction.

In the wake of the decision, Perez leveled serious charges against the sport's governing body, the World Taekwondo Federation:

- He claimed that the protest was not properly handled. Typically, decisions on protests must be made within 15 minutes. No response was made for 45 minutes.
- He also stated that the US team received no indication why the protest was deemed "unacceptable". According to Perez, "Unacceptable could mean anything from we didn’t file the papers properly to we didn’t use the right color pencil... Under the WTF competition rules, we should have been notified about the decision, the criteria, the methodology used, what evidence was presented, and what referees were reviewing it. We were not."
- Perez also said that at a June 2008 conference, the heads of the 25 teams that were to compete in Beijing were asked to sign an agreement not to file any protests at the Games.
- After his protest was denied, Perez alleged that WTF officials approached him and asked him not to talk to the press.

Charles Robinson, a writer for Yahoo! Sports in the US, called the events surrounding Lopez's match "a chaotic episode that might ultimately prove to be the tipping point to Olympic doom", adding that it had been widely rumored that taekwondo was on the brink of being removed from the Olympic program.
