= 2013 World Taekwondo Championships – Women's middleweight =

Taekwondo competition

Women's middleweight at the 2013 World Championships
- Venue: Exhibition Center of Puebla
- Dates: 19 July 2013
- Competitors: 33 from 33 nations

Medalists
gold medal	Glenhis Hernández	Cuba
silver medal	Lee In-jong	South Korea
bronze medal	Jasmine Vokey	Canada
bronze medal	Casandra Ikonen	Sweden

The women's middleweight is a competition featured at the 2013 World Taekwondo Championships, and was held at the Exhibition Center of Puebla in Puebla, Mexico on July 19. Middleweights were limited to a maximum of 73 kilograms in body mass.

== Results ==
- DQ — Won by disqualification

=== Finals ===
Semifinals		Final
Jasmine Vokey (CAN)	1
Glenhis Hernández (CUB)	7	Glenhis Hernández (CUB)	5
Lee In-jong (KOR)	7	Lee In-jong (KOR)	1
Casandra Ikonen (SWE)	3

=== Top half ===
==== Section 1 ====
Round of 64
Marina Dimitropoulou (GRE)	3
Anđela Popović (MNE)	1

Round of 32
María Espinoza (MEX)	8
Marina Dimitropoulou (GRE)	11
Kirstie Alora (PHI)	14
Alana Peraldi (NCD)	3
Jasmine Vokey (CAN)	6
Hà Thị Nguyên (VIE)	3
Maristella Smiraglia (ITA)	1
Elena Gómez (ESP)	2

Round of 16
Marina Dimitropoulou (GRE)	5
Kirstie Alora (PHI)	10
Jasmine Vokey (CAN)	4
Elena Gómez (ESP)	3

Quarterfinals
Kirstie Alora (PHI)	1
Jasmine Vokey (CAN)	4

==== Section 2 ====
Round of 64

Round of 32
Milica Mandić (SRB)	2
Chen Yann-yeu (TPE)	0
Marina Tedeeva (AZE)	DQ
~~Grace Ibogni (GAB)~~
Gulnafis Aitmukhambetova (KAZ)	17
Yaprak Eriş (TUR)	8
Glenhis Hernández (CUB)	6
Melda Akcan (GER)	1

Round of 16
Milica Mandić (SRB)	16
Marina Tedeeva (AZE)	1
Gulnafis Aitmukhambetova (KAZ)	1
Glenhis Hernández (CUB)	10

Quarterfinals
Milica Mandić (SRB)	3
Glenhis Hernández (CUB)	7

=== Bottom half ===
==== Section 3 ====
Round of 64

Round of 32
Lauren Hamon (USA)	6
Aliya Mursalimova (UKR)	1
~~Aminata Doumbia (MLI)~~
Guzel Kurbanova (RUS)	DQ
Sita Sanogo (CIV)	5
Reshmie Oogink (NED)	6
Wang Xiaofei (CHN)	2
Lee In-jong (KOR)	3

Round of 16
Lauren Hamon (USA)	0
Guzel Kurbanova (RUS)	0
Reshmie Oogink (NED)	3
Lee In-jong (KOR)	4

Quarterfinals
Lauren Hamon (USA)	0
Lee In-jong (KOR)	7

==== Section 4 ====
Round of 64

Round of 32
Deysy Montes de Oca (DOM)	1
Eve Ember (AUS)	3
Carolina Fernández (VEN)	3
Nikki Martínez (PUR)	7
Ana Carolina Souza (BRA)	2
Sandra Vanegas (COL)	11
Casandra Ikonen (SWE)	3
Gwladys Épangue (FRA)	0

Round of 16
Eve Ember (AUS)	0
Nikki Martínez (PUR)	12
Sandra Vanegas (COL)	5
Casandra Ikonen (SWE)	6

Quarterfinals
Nikki Martínez (PUR)	1
Casandra Ikonen (SWE)	6
