= Taekwondo at the 2010 Asian Games – Women's +73 kg =

Taekwondo competition

Women's +73 kg at the 2010 Asian Games
- Venue: Guangdong Gymnasium
- Date: 20 November 2010
- Competitors: 5 from 5 nations

Medalists
| gold medal | Liu Rui | China |
| silver medal | Oh Jung-ah | South Korea |
| bronze medal | Nadin Dawani | Jordan |
| bronze medal | Evgeniya Karimova | Uzbekistan |

The women's heavyweight (+73 kilograms) event at the 2010 Asian Games took place on 20 November 2010 at Guangdong Gymnasium, Guangzhou, China.

== Schedule ==
All times are China Standard Time (UTC+08:00)

| Date | Time | Event |
|---|---|---|
| Saturday, 20 November 2010 | 14:00 | Quarterfinals |
| Saturday, 20 November 2010 | 14:00 | Semifinals |
| Saturday, 20 November 2010 | 16:30 | Final |

== Results ==
| Quarterfinals | | Semifinals | | Final |
| | | Nadin Dawani (JOR) | 1 |
| Kamineni Srilakshmi (IND) | 0 | Oh Jung-ah (KOR) | 8 |
| Oh Jung-ah (KOR) | 9 | | | Oh Jung-ah (KOR) | 3 |
| | | | | Liu Rui (CHN) | 4 |
| | | Liu Rui (CHN) | 4 |
| | | Evgeniya Karimova (UZB) | 2 |
