= Taekwondo at the 2008 Summer Olympics – Women's +67 kg =

Taekwondo competition

Women's +67 kg at the Games of the XXIX Olympiad
- Venue: Beijing Science and Technology University Gymnasium
- Date: 23 August 2008
- Competitors: 16 from 16 nations

Medalists
1st place, gold medalist(s)		María del Rosario Espinoza	Mexico
2nd place, silver medalist(s)		Nina Solheim	Norway
3rd place, bronze medalist(s)		Sarah Stevenson	Great Britain
3rd place, bronze medalist(s)		Natália Falavigna	Brazil

The women's +67 kg competition in taekwondo at the 2008 Summer Olympics in Beijing took place on 23 August at the Beijing Science and Technology University Gymnasium.

== Competition format ==
The main bracket consisted of a single elimination tournament, culminating in the gold medal match. Two bronze medals were awarded at the taekwondo competitions. A repechage was used to determine the bronze medal winners. Every competitor who lost to one of the two finalists competed in the repechage, another single-elimination competition. Each semifinal loser faced the last remaining repechage competitor from the opposite half of the bracket in a bronze medal match.

== Controversy ==
The quarterfinal match between Sarah Stevenson of Great Britain and China's Chen Zhong on August 23 was plagued by controversy. Chen Zhong had led 1-0 through most of the match but 4 seconds before the end, Stevenson landed a clear strike to the face of her opponent. However, only half the judges recorded the hit which was thus not registered, dashing Stevenson's olympic hopes of gaining her the two points that would have secured her a quick victory. Stevenson's coach was furious and protested to the referee and judges, but initially Zhong was awarded the match. The British team protested for over an hour and on seeing the clear video footage of the strike to the face, unprecedently in the sport of Taekwondo, the judges decision was repealed and it was Stevenson who went through to the semi-finals against María del Rosario Espinoza of Mexico. Espinoza however, with a disoriented crowd looking on at the loss of their Chinese gold medal hope, secured a clear victory over Stevenson and went on to win gold, whilst Stevenson took bronze in the bronze medal match against the Egyptian Noha Abd Rabo.

On announcing the change of result in the quarter-final, the tournament director said:

"The competition supervisory board has looked into this matter deeply, has made video analysis which has been open to all the referees and judges. In applying paragraph two of page 64 of the competition rules of the World Taekwondo Federation we have to change this result and we have to declare the British player as winner. We are very sorry to the spectators of China but justice is first. Thank you for understanding."

== Schedule ==
All times are China standard time (UTC+8)

Date	Time	Round
Saturday, 23 August 2008	09:00; 15:00; 17:00; 20:00	Preliminary round Quarterfinals; Semifinals; Final

== Qualifying Athletes ==
Athlete	Country
Nina Solheim	Norway
Noha Abd Rabo	Egypt
Che Chew Chan	Malaysia
Evgeniya Karimova	Uzbekistan
Lorena Benites	Ecuador
Carmen Marton	Australia
Natália Falavigna	Brazil
Kyriaki Kouvari	Greece
Khaoula Ben Hamza	Tunisia
María del Rosario Espinoza	Mexico
Karolina Kedzierska	Sweden
Rosana Simon	Spain
Chen Zhong	China
Adriana Carmona	Venezuela
Nadin Dawani	Jordan
Sarah Stevenson	Great Britain

== Results ==
Legend

- PTG — Won by points gap
- SUP — Won by superiority
- OT — Won on over time (Golden Point)

=== Main bracket ===
Preliminary round
1	Nina Solheim (NOR)	9
16	Noha Abd Rabo (EGY)	3
8	Che Chew Chan (MAS)	5
9	Evgeniya Karimova (UZB)	4
5	Lorena Benites (ECU)	0
12	Carmen Marton (AUS)	2
4	Natália Falavigna (BRA)	3
13	Kyriaki Kouvari (GRE)	1
6	Khaoula Ben Hamza (TUN)	0
11	María del Rosario Espinoza (MEX)	4
3	Karolina Kedzierska (SWE)	5
14	Rosana Simon (ESP)	4
7	Chen Zhong (CHN)	3
10	Adriana Carmona (VEN)	1
2	Nadin Dawani (JOR)	2
15	Sarah Stevenson (GBR)	3

Quarterfinals
Nina Solheim (NOR)	3
Che Chew Chan (MAS)	1
Carmen Marton (AUS)	2
Natália Falavigna (BRA)	5
María del Rosario Espinoza (MEX)	4
Karolina Kedzierska (SWE)	2
Chen Zhong (CHN)	~~1~~ 1
Sarah Stevenson (GBR)	~~0~~ 2

Semifinals
Nina Solheim (NOR)	(SUP) 2
Natália Falavigna (BRA)	2
María del Rosario Espinoza (MEX)	4
Sarah Stevenson (GBR)	1

Gold medal match
Nina Solheim (NOR)	1
María del Rosario Espinoza (MEX)	3

=== Repechage ===
Round 1
Karolina Kedzierska (SWE)	5
Khaoula Ben Hamza (TUN)	4
Noha Abd Rabo (EGY)	5
Che Chew Chan (MAS)	1

Bronze medal match
Karolina Kedzierska (SWE)	2
Natália Falavigna (BRA)	5
Sarah Stevenson (GBR)	5
Noha Abd Rabo (EGY)	1
