= Jorge Luis Mancillas Ramírez =

Mexican jurist

Jorge Luis Mancillas Ramírez is a Mexican jurist who has been a minister of the Superior Court of Justice of Nuevo Leon since 2004. In 2005 Mancillas Ramírez was designated President of the Court.

Mancillas has also been professor of law at the Autonomous University of Nuevo León and at the Universidad Regiomontana (UR).

Preceded by Genaro Muñoz Muñoz	President of the Superior Court of Justice of Nuevo León; 2005—2007	Succeeded by Gustavo Adolfo Guerrero Gutiérrez
