= Liu Rui =

Liu Rui may refer to:

- Liu Rui (curler)
- Liu Rui (taekwondo)
- Liu Rui (wrestler)
