= Glenhis Hernández =

Cuban taekwondo practitioner

Personal information
- Nationality: Cuban
- Born: October 7, 1990 (age 35) Havana

Sport
- Country: Cuba
- Sport: Taekwondo
- Event: Middleweight (-73 kg)
Medal record
Women's taekwondo
Representing Cuba
World Championships
Gold medal – first place	2013 Puebla	Middleweight
Pan American Games
Gold medal – first place	2011 Guadalajara	+67 kg
Central American and Caribbean Games
Silver medal – second place	2014 Veracruz	Under 73 kg
- Updated on 28 November 2014

Glenhis Hernández (born 7 October 1990 in Havana) is a taekwondo practitioner from Cuba. She was the 2013 World Champion in middleweight.

== 2012 Olympics ==
Hernández won her preliminary round match against Wiam Dislam 2–1. She beat Maryna Konieva 4–2 in the quarterfinals. She lost to Anne-Caroline Graffe 4–6 in the semi-final of table A. She lost again to Maria del Rosario Espinoza 2–4 in the contest for bronze medal B.

== 2013 World Championships ==
At the 2013 World Championships in Puebla, Hernández achieved the high point of her career by winning the gold medal. In the final match she beat her Korean opponent Lee In-jong 5–1.

== See also ==
- Taekwondo at the 2012 Summer Olympics – Women's +67 kg
