= Lorena Benítes =

Ecuadorian taekwondo practitioner (born 1982)

Personal information
- Full name: Lorena Aida Benítes Valverde
- Nationality: Ecuador
- Born: 24 July 1982 (age 43) Esmeraldas, Ecuador
- Height: 1.74 m (5 ft 8 1/2 in)
- Weight: 67 kg (148 lb)

Sport
- Sport: Taekwondo
- Event: +67 kg
- Club: Federación Provincial de Esmeraldas
- Coached by: Duvan Cangá

Lorena Aida Benítes Valverde (born 24 July 1982 in Esmeraldas) is an Ecuadorian taekwondo practitioner. She represented Ecuador at the 2008 Summer Olympics in Beijing, where she competed and played in the women's heavyweight category (+67 kg), an event which was later dominated by Mexico's María Espinoza. She was eliminated in the first preliminary round of the competition, after being defeated by Australia's Carmen Marton, who only scored two points in the match.
