= Taekwondo at the 2012 Summer Olympics – Women's +67 kg =

Taekwondo competition

Women's +67kg at the Games of the XXX Olympiad
- Venue: ExCeL Exhibition Centre
- Date: 11 August
- Competitors: 16 from 16 nations

Medalists
1st place, gold medalist(s)		Milica Mandić	Serbia
2nd place, silver medalist(s)		Anne-Caroline Graffe	France
3rd place, bronze medalist(s)		Anastasia Baryshnikova	Russia
3rd place, bronze medalist(s)		María Espinoza	Mexico

The women's +67 kg competition at the 2012 Summer Olympics was held on 11 August, at the ExCeL Exhibition Centre.

== Competition format ==
The main bracket consisted of a single elimination tournament, culminating in the gold medal match. Two bronze medals were awarded at the Taekwondo competitions. A repechage was used to determine the bronze medal winners. Every competitor who lost to one of the two finalists competed in the repechage, another single-elimination competition. Each semifinal loser faced the last remaining repechage competitor from the opposite half of the bracket in a bronze medal match.

== Schedule ==
All times are British Summer Time (UTC+1)

Date	Time	Round
Saturday, 11 August 2012	09:00; 15:00; 17:00; 22:15	Preliminary Round; Quarterfinals; Semifinals; Final

== Results ==
On 13 July 2012, the World Taekwondo Federation released the provisional draw which included the top eight seeds for the competition. The remainder of the qualified athletes were randomly drawn on 6 August 2012.

=== Main Bracket ===
Preliminary round
1	Anne-Caroline Graffe (FRA)	17
Natalya Mamatova (UZB)	9
Lee In Jong (KOR)	13
8	Natália Falavigna (BRA)	9
5	Nadin Dawani (JOR)	13
Maryna Konieva (UKR)	18
Glenhis Hernández (CUB)	1 (SUD)
4	Wiam Dislam (MAR)	0
3	Anastasia Baryshnikova (RUS)	12
Khaoula Ben Hamza (TUN)	6
Nusa Rajher (SLO)	17 (SUD)
6	Feruza Yergeshova (KAZ)	16
7	Milica Mandić (SRB)	16 (PTG)
Talitiga Crawley (SAM)	2
Davin Sorn (CAM)	2
2	María Espinoza (MEX)	3

Quarterfinals
1	Anne-Caroline Graffe (FRA)	7
Lee In Jong (KOR)	4
Maryna Konieva (UKR)	2
Glenhis Hernández (CUB)	16 (PTG)
3	Anastasia Baryshnikova (RUS)	11
Nusa Rajher (SLO)	9
7	Milica Mandić (SRB)	6
2	María Espinoza (MEX)	4

Semifinals
1	Anne-Caroline Graffe (FRA)	6
Glenhis Hernández (CUB)	4
3	Anastasia Baryshnikova (RUS)	3
7	Milica Mandić (SRB)	11

Gold medal match
1	Anne-Caroline Graffe (FRA)	7
7	Milica Mandić (SRB)	9

=== Repechage ===
Preliminary Round
