= Héctor González =

Héctor González is the name of:

- Héctor González (Venezuelan footballer) (born 1977), Venezuelan football midfielder
- Héctor González Baeza (born 1986), Spanish cyclist
- Héctor González (footballer, born 1937) (1937–2015), Colombian football forward
- Héctor González (footballer, born 1972), Ecuadorian football midfielder
- Héctor González González (1882–1948), Mexican lawyer, politician, writer, journalist, and intellectual
- Hector Gonzalez (judge) (born 1964), United States district judge
