= María Teresa Herrera =

Mexican lawyer (born 1956)

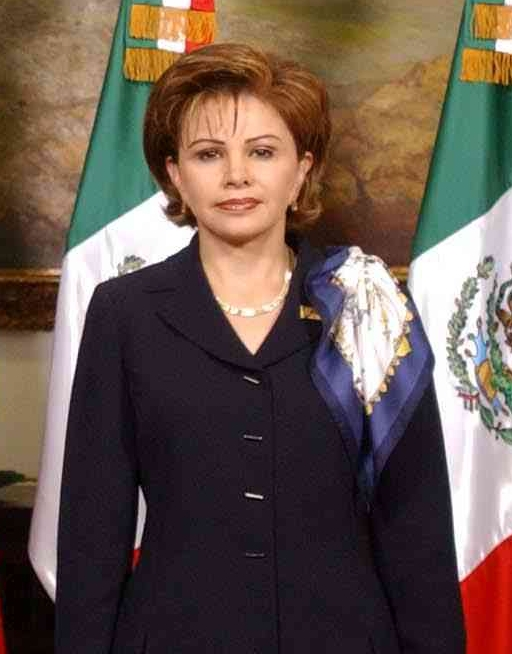
- María Teresa Herrera

President of the Superior Court of Justice of Nuevo León
- In office 1996–1999
- Preceded by: Nicolas Díaz Obregón
- Succeeded by: Enrique Guzmán Benavides

María Teresa Herrera Tello (born October 15, 1956, in Santiago, Nuevo León) is a Mexican lawyer. She served in the cabinet of President Vicente Fox as Secretary of Agrarian Reform (2000 – 2003).

== Life ==
She was born on October 15, 1956, in Santiago, Nuevo León.

Herrera Tello graduated as a valedictorian with a bachelor's degree in law from the Autonomous University of Nuevo León.

She was the first woman in the history of Nuevo León to become a magistrate in the state's Superior Court of Justice (in Spanish: Tribunal Superior de Justicia de Nuevo León). Eventually she presided over the court and was reelected four consecutive times.

She served as Secretary of Agrarian Reform (Secretaria de la Reforma Agraria) from December 1, 2000, until April 5, 2003, when she was appointed legal councilor to the Mexican president. On November 18, 2004, she was appointed councilor to the Federal Judicature Council (Consejo de la Judicatura Federal).

Preceded by Nicolas Díaz Obregón	President of the Superior Court of Justice of Nuevo León; 1996-1999	Succeeded by Enrique Guzmán Benavides
