= XHMNU-TDT =

University Television station in Monterrey, Nuevo León, Mexico

- Monterrey, Nuevo León; Mexico
- City: Monterrey, Nuevo León
- Channels: Digital: 35 (UHF); Virtual: 53
- Branding: Canal 53

Ownership
- Owner: Universidad Autónoma de Nuevo León
- Sister stations: XHUNL-FM

History
- Founded: June 1990
- Former call signs: XHMNU-TV (1990-2015)
- Former channel numbers: Analog: 53 (UHF; 1990-2015); Virtual: 35 (PSIP; 2014-2016)
- Call sign meaning: Monterrey, NUevo León

Technical information
- Licensing authority: CRT
- ERP: 250 kW
- Transmitter coordinates: 25°43′31.50″N 100°18′36.90″W

Links
- Website: radioytv.uanl.mx

XHMNU-TDT is an educational television station owned and operated by the Universidad Autónoma de Nuevo León (UANL) in Monterrey, Nuevo León, Mexico.

Programming on XHMNU generally consists of educational telecourse programs for UANL students, plus public affairs, documentary and cultural programming.

== History ==
XHMNU-TV was one of the first university-run broadcast stations in Mexico, signing on channel 53 in June 1990 under the auspices of the School of Mechanical and Electrical Engineering at UANL. Its purpose was to serve as a field laboratory for students studying communications engineering. Its transmitter was located on the third floor of the Center for Design and Maintenance of Instruments, and its signal only reached a radius of 3 kilometres (1.9 mi) from the site. The station's first broadcast was a message from Governor Jorge Treviño Martínez. Programming was supplied by other schools, such as the School of Communication and of Philosophy and Letters. The Central Directorate for Audiovisual Communication coordinated the production of newscasts.

In 2001, XHMNU-TV came under the aegis of the rector of the university. On September 24, 2003, XHMNU moved its transmitter and drastically increased its power to 500 kW to cover the entire Monterrey metropolitan area. The next year, an agreement between UANL and Cablevisión Monterrey put channel 53 on cable in the city.

XHMNU is operated by the university's Center for Broadcast Communication and Production, which is also responsible for the production and operation of university publications and XHUNL-FM 89.7.

On September 24, 2015, XHMNU shut off its analog signal; its digital signal on UHF channel 35 remained. With digital television, XHMNU briefly began using virtual channel 35 but returned to 53 in October 2016. In October 2015, XHMNU was authorized to raise the power of its station to 250 kW; the digital station had previously broadcast with 40 kilowatts ERP.

== Programs ==
=== Own production ===
- Contigo de 9 a 10 y mas..
- Deportes 53
- Peinate una sonrisa
- NotiUni
- Desde Colegio Civil
- Oriéntate
- Acción Legal
- Vertientes de la Psique Humana
- Laboratorio Escénico
- Entre Libros

=== Radio production ===
- De la peña al antro
- Radio 89.7 TV
- Caminito de la escuela (taped)
- Lo mejor de Radio en TV
