= XHUNL-FM =

University radio station in Monterrey

- Monterrey, Nuevo León; Mexico
- Broadcast area: Monterrey & Nuevo León
- Frequency: 89.7 MHz
- Branding: Radio UANL

Programming
- Format: University radio

Ownership
- Owner: Universidad Autónoma de Nuevo León

History
- First air date: July 18, 1991 (permit)
- Call sign meaning: Universidad Autónoma de Nuevo León

Technical information
- Licensing authority: CRT
- Class: A
- ERP: 3 kW
- HAAT: −184.5 meters (−605 ft)
- Transmitter coordinates: 25°43′31.52″N 100°18′36.98″W

Links
- Webcast: XHUNL-FM
- Website: radioytv.uanl.mx

XHUNL-FM is a radio station serving Monterrey, Nuevo León, Mexico, located in San Nicolás de los Garza. Owned by the Universidad Autónoma de Nuevo León, XHUNL-FM broadcasts on 89.7 FM from studios and a transmitter on the UANL campus.

It is a sister station to XHMNU-TDT digital 35.
