= Kyriaki Kouvari =

Greek taekwondo practitioner

Personal information
- Nationality: Greece
- Born: 19 January 1984 (age 42) Thessaloniki, Greece
- Height: 1.80 m (5 ft 11 in)
- Weight: 73 kg (161 lb)

Sport
- Sport: Taekwondo
- Event: +67 kg
- Club: Keratsini
Medal record
Representing Greece
Women's taekwondo
World Championships
Bronze medal – third place	2003 Garmisch-Partenkirchen	+67 kg

Kyriaki Kouvari (Greek: Κυριακή Κούβαρη; born January 19, 1984, in Thessaloniki) is a Greek taekwondo practitioner. She won the bronze medal for the heavyweight category at the 2003 World Taekwondo Championships in Garmisch-Partenkirchen, Germany.

Kouvari competed for the women's heavyweight category (+67 kg) at the 2008 Summer Olympics in Beijing, after defeating Great Britain's Sarah Stevenson for the gold medal at the World Qualification Tournament in Manchester, England. She lost the first preliminary match by a defensive kick from Brazil's Natália Falavigna, with a score of 1–3.
