= Che Chew Chan =

Malaysian taekwondo practitioner (born 1982)

Personal information
- Nationality: Malaysia
- Born: 1 October 1982 (age 43) Johor Bahru, Malaysia
- Height: 1.79 m (5 ft 10 1/2 in)
- Weight: 68 kg (150 lb)

Chinese name
- Chinese: 徐萩玹
- Hanyu Pinyin: Xú Qiūxuán
- Jyutping: Ceoi4 Cau1 Sing4
- Hokkien POJ: Chhî Chhiu-hiân

Sport
- Sport: Taekwondo
- Event: +67 kg

Achievements and titles
- Highest world ranking: 6th, 2009
Medal record
Women's taekwondo
Representing Malaysia
Commonwealth Games
Silver medal – second place	2006 Brisbane	67 kg
Universiade
Silver medal – second place	2007 Bangkok	67 kg
Asian Championships
Silver medal – second place	2008 Luoyang	67 kg
SEA Games
Gold medal – first place	2001 Kuala Lumpur	72 kg
Gold medal – first place	2005 Manila	67 kg
Gold medal – first place	2007 Bangkok	67 kg
Gold medal – first place	2009 Vientiane	67 kg

Che Chew Chan (born 1 October 1982 in Pontian, Johor) is a Malaysian taekwondo practitioner. She is a three-time defending champion for the middleweight category and won a total of four gold medals at the SEA Games, a silver medalist at the 2007 Summer Universiade in Bangkok, Thailand, and a silver medalist at the 2008 Asian Taekwondo Championships in Luoyang, China.

Che qualified for the 2008 Summer Olympics in Beijing, after winning a gold medal for the women's 72 kg class at the Asian Taekwondo Qualifying Tournament for Beijing Olympic Games in Vietnam. She competed for the women's heavyweight category (+67 kg), where she first defeated Uzbekistan's Evgeniya Karimova in the preliminary match, with a decisive score of 5–4. A few hours later, she lost the quarterfinal match to Norway's Nina Solheim, with a score of 1–3. Because Solheim advanced further into the final match against Mexico's María del Rosario Espinoza, Che was offered another shot for a bronze medal triumph through the repechage bout, where she was eventually defeated by Egypt's Noha Abd Rabo, with a lethargic performance, at a score of 1–5.
