= Autonomous University of Nuevo León =

University in Nuevo León, Mexico

- Universidad Autónoma de Nuevo León
- Motto: Alere Flammam Veritatis
- Motto in English: "Encouraging the flame of truth"
- Type: Public
- Established: 25 September 1933; 92 years ago
- Affiliations: ANUIES, CUMEX, CONAHEC, International Association of Universities, ONEFA
- Endowment: US$490 million (2014)
- Rector: Santos Guzmán López
- Academic staff: 6,894 (2022)
- Students: 214,871 (as of 2022)
- Undergraduates: 130,179 (as of 2022)
- Postgraduates: 5,209 (as of 2022)
- Other students: 79,427 (high school) (as of 2022)
- Location: San Nicolás de los Garza, Nuevo León, Mexico; 25°43′38″N 100°18′37″W
- Campus: 7 across the state; mostly urban.
- Colors: Blue and Yellow
- Nickname: Tigres
- Website: www.uanl.mx

The Autonomous University of Nuevo León (Spanish: Universidad Autónoma de Nuevo León; UANL) is a public research university with seven campuses across the northern Mexican state of Nuevo León. Founded as University of Nuevo León on 25 September 1933, it is the third largest public university in Mexico in terms of student population and the most important institution of higher learning in Northeastern Mexico, which offers the highest number of academic programs. It is also the oldest university in the state, it is currently headquartered in San Nicolás de los Garza, a suburb of Monterrey.

The UANL has seven distinct campuses: the Main Campus called "Ciudad Universitaria" (University City), which houses the Administration Building, Colleges of Law, Mechanical and Electric Engineering, Biological Sciences, Chemistry, Public Accounting and Philosophy, Architecture and Industrial Design, amongst others, as well as the Football and Soccer Stadiums, and other sport facilities. Other campuses include the Health Sciences Campus, which houses the Medicine College, as well as Dentistry, Nursing and psychology; The Mederos Humanities and Fine Arts campus which houses the Visual Arts College, as well as Performing Arts College, Music College, Communication Sciences among other such as Economy College and the Political Sciences; The Marin Agronomy Center, the Escobedo Agricultural Sciences Campus, the Linares Earth Sciences, and Forestry campus, as well as the Sabinas Hidalgo facilities, where extensions of the Colleges of Law, and Business are housed.

The institution includes 84 libraries with a total of 2,238,000 library volumes. It has 27 research facilities with 438 national researchers, 16 academic journals, 9 main campus bookstores, 25 student computer centers and 53 cafeterias.

The university has been ranked by various organizations as one of the best public universities in Mexico and Latin America, it has been ranked fourth place in a publication of the Best Universities Of Mexico 2014 by the Rankia Organization in Mexico, and is ranked as one of the ten most recognized universities in Mexico by a number of organizations like QS World University Rankings and the Mexican journal "El Universal".

== History ==
=== Foundation ===
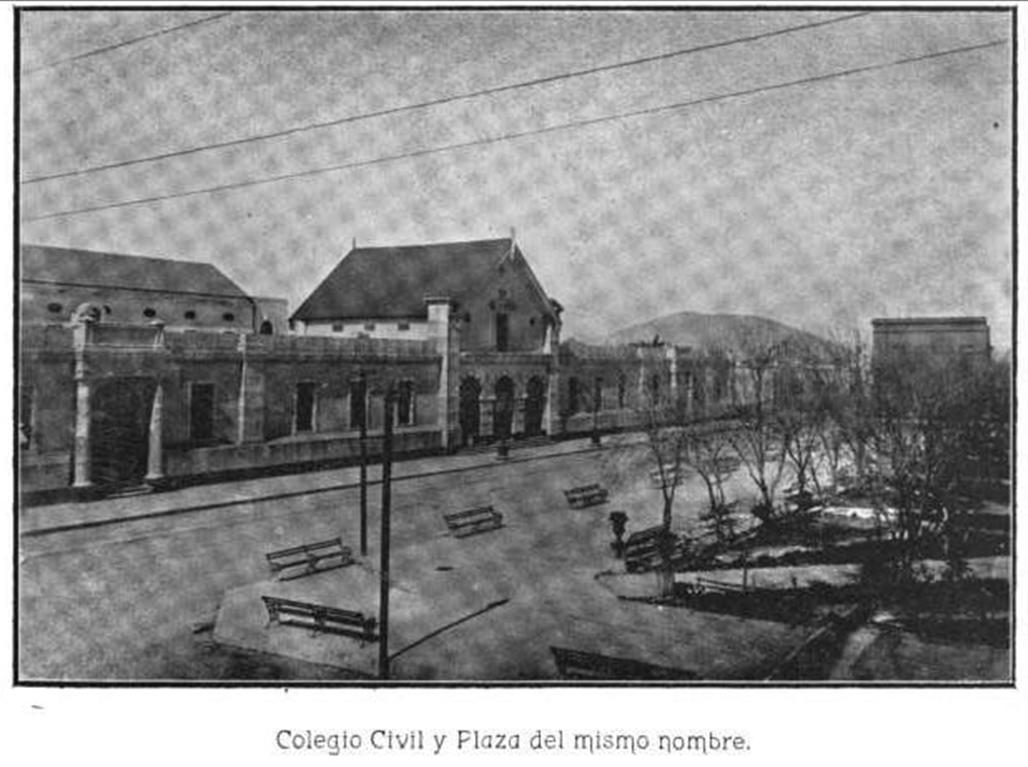
The Civil Academy, one of the five institutions that joined efforts to create the University of Nuevo León in 1933.

The immediate forerunner of this public university dates back to 1859, when the Civil Academy (Colegio Civil) started its courses. This institution had been envisioned by Governor Santiago Vidaurri but was erected by his successor, José Silvestre Aramberri, after the former was removed from office. The academy began to sponsor the Pharmacy and Medicine courses José Eleuterio González had been teaching at the local Hospital of the Rosary for several decades. The academic offerings included courses in Law and Medicine, as well as a preparatory school. Its first director was José de Jesús Dávila y Prieto.

On 29 October 1932, the delegations of the state schools of Law, Medicine and Pharmacy; the Civil Academy and the normal school, submitted a project to the Congress of Nuevo León to organize a state university for the Monterrey Metropolitan area. On 7 November 1932, the state congress ordered to proceed with the request and on 25 September 1933 the University of Nuevo León was born. Héctor González González was elected as the first rector of the university.

In its first year, 1,864 students were schooled by 218 professors from the faculties of Medicine, Law, Engineering, and Chemistry, the Normal School, a preparatory school, the School of Nurses and Obstetricians and the Álvaro Obregón and Pablo Livas Industrial Schools. The institution became plagued with political disputes and almost two years later, on 25 September 1935, it was closed by state decree, only to reopen almost eight years later, on 13 September 1943.

=== Expansion ===
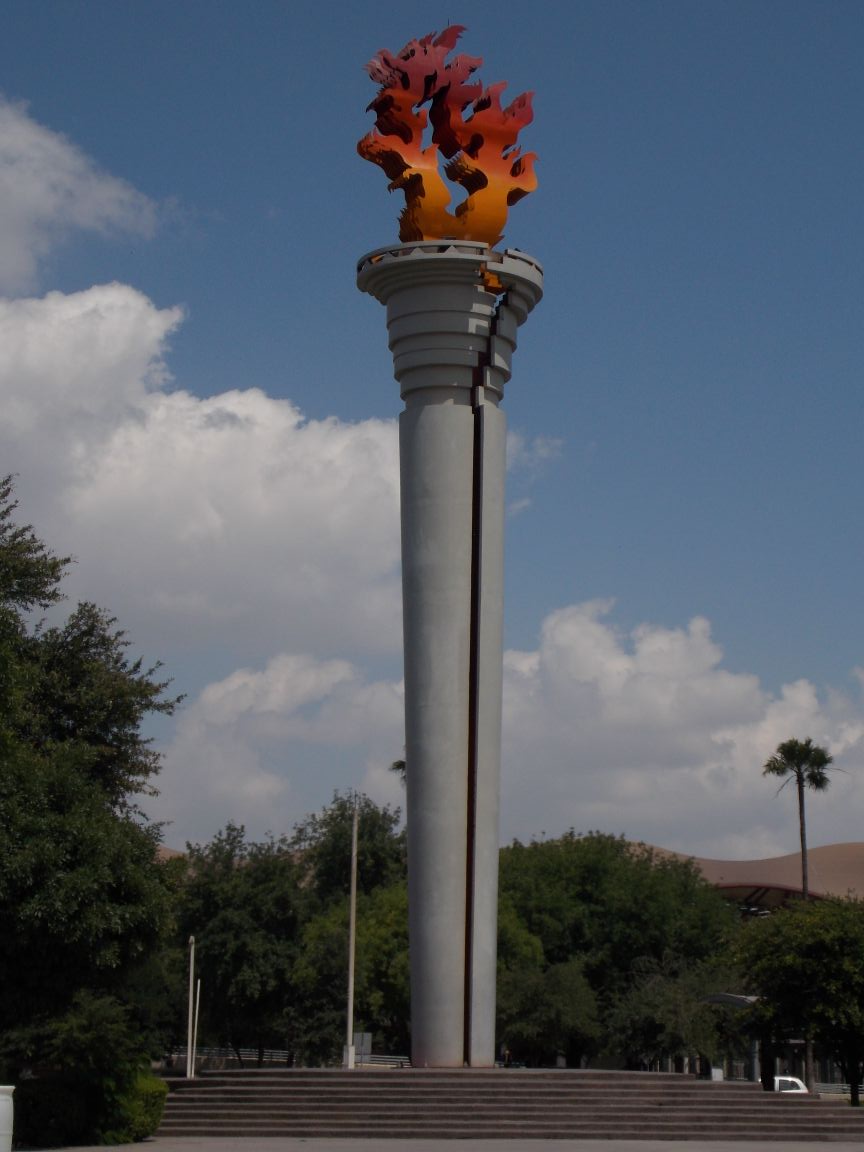
Metro Area of Monterrey: "Alere flammam veritatis" Monument (Feed the flame of truth), in the main campus of the Universidad Autónoma de Nuevo León, UANL

The number of faculty and personnel began to grow and this prompted the construction of its own campus in 1958, the University City (Ciudad Universitaria), an academic complex located in San Nicolás de los Garza, a suburb to the state capital. In 1967, its open-air stadium was finished. From 1968 to 1972, the university was hit once again by student protests and political disputes, and by 1971 the protests had forced the government to stop from interfering in its internal affairs and recognize a statute of autonomy that became part of its current name: Autonomous University of Nuevo León (Universidad Autónoma de Nuevo León).

In the late 1990s the institution saw the necessity to rent its professional football (soccer) team, which has maintained in the Mexican professional league (Tigres de la UANL), and was later affected by a corruption scandal that involved its own rector but ended with no legal consequences for those accused.

== Campuses ==
The university has seven campuses across the state:

- University City (Ciudad Universitaria) in San Nicolás de los Garza, which houses thirteen schools; a 43,150-seat, open air stadium; its two main libraries, computer labs, cafeterias and the main bookstore.
- Agricultural and Animal Sciences Campus, in Escobedo, houses a local branch of both the Agronomy and Veterinary Medicine schools, a center for research and development in food sciences (CIDIA) and a center for business development.
- Health Sciences Campus, in Monterrey, housing the Schools of Dentistry, Medicine, Nursing, Psychology, Public Health and Nutrition, along the University Hospital and a health clinic for its personnel.
- Marin Campus in Marin, home of the School of Agronomy.
- Mederos Campus, in Monterrey, housing the Schools of Economics, Communication Studies, Music, Political Sciences and International Relations, Stage Arts and Visual Arts, along the university theater, a state branch of the World Trade Centers Association and the Bilingual Education Research Center (CIDEB).
- Linares Campus in the Southern municipality of Linares, housing the Earth Sciences, Forestry, and a branch of the Accounting and Business Administration faculty schools.
- Sabinas Hidalgo Campus in Sabinas Hidalgo, home of a local branch of Law and Business Administration schools.

== Preparatorias (High Schools) ==
The university also runs 36 high schools of which 7 are Technical High Schools, one is a Bilingual International High School, and the rest are 2-year high schools. 25 other schools around the state that are not property of the UANL are incorporated to the university, which means that these schools meet the norms established by the institution (a minimum infrastructure of libraries, laboratories, class rooms, school programs accepted by the UANL, and certified academic staff).

== Organization ==
The current rector is Santos Guzmán López. The university also has a symphony orchestra, a chamber orchestra, and a band of regional music, El Tigre.

== Athletics ==
The UANL's teams are called Tigres (Tigers).

The American football team, named the Auténticos Tigres, is very successful in the ONEFA. The program has won five national championships (1974, 1977, 2009, 2011, and 2012), and four times has been runner-up. They play in the Estadio Gaspar Mass.

UANL teams have also won the national universiade in 2006, 2007, 2008 and 2009

The UANL installations include the Raymundo "Chico" Rivera Stadium (a football and athletic field), the Luis Eugenio Todd Gym, a baseball park, an indoor football pitch, and a tennis center with four courts

The football team Tigres de la UANL was managed by the UANL until 1996, when the team's control passed to Cemex through a 30 years agreement, but the team has always belonged to the UANL. The Estadio Universitario is located in the principal campus of the UANL, and occasionally is host of Auténticos Tigres games, and others activities of the university.

The University Olympic Aquatic Centre Centro Acuático Olímpico Universitario is one of the best aquatic centers of the country. It is also located in the main campus and there are swimming, water polo, diving and synchronized swimming teams.

== Notable alumni ==
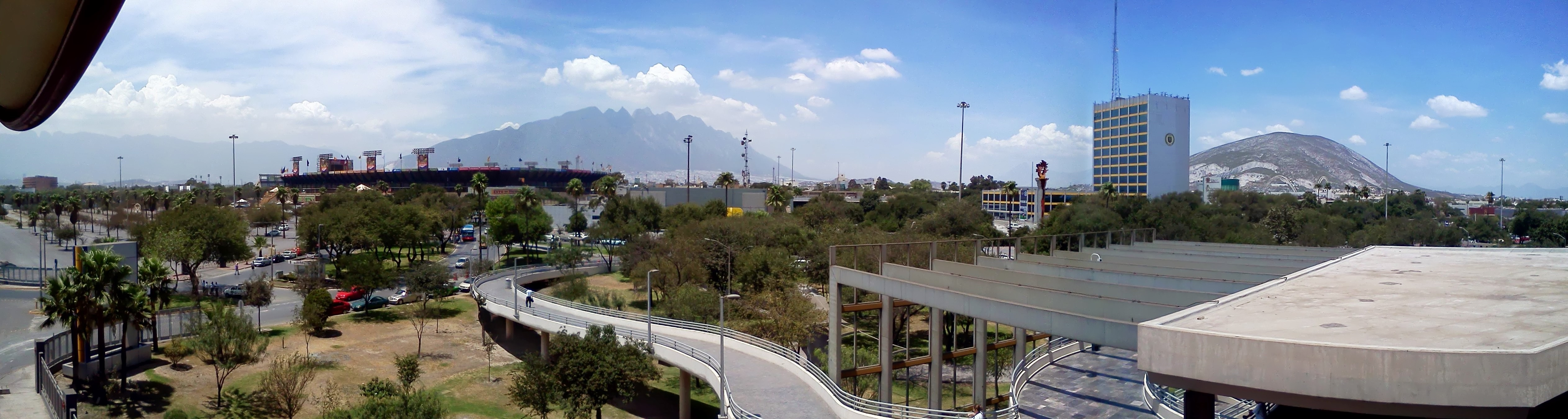
Ciudad Universitaria

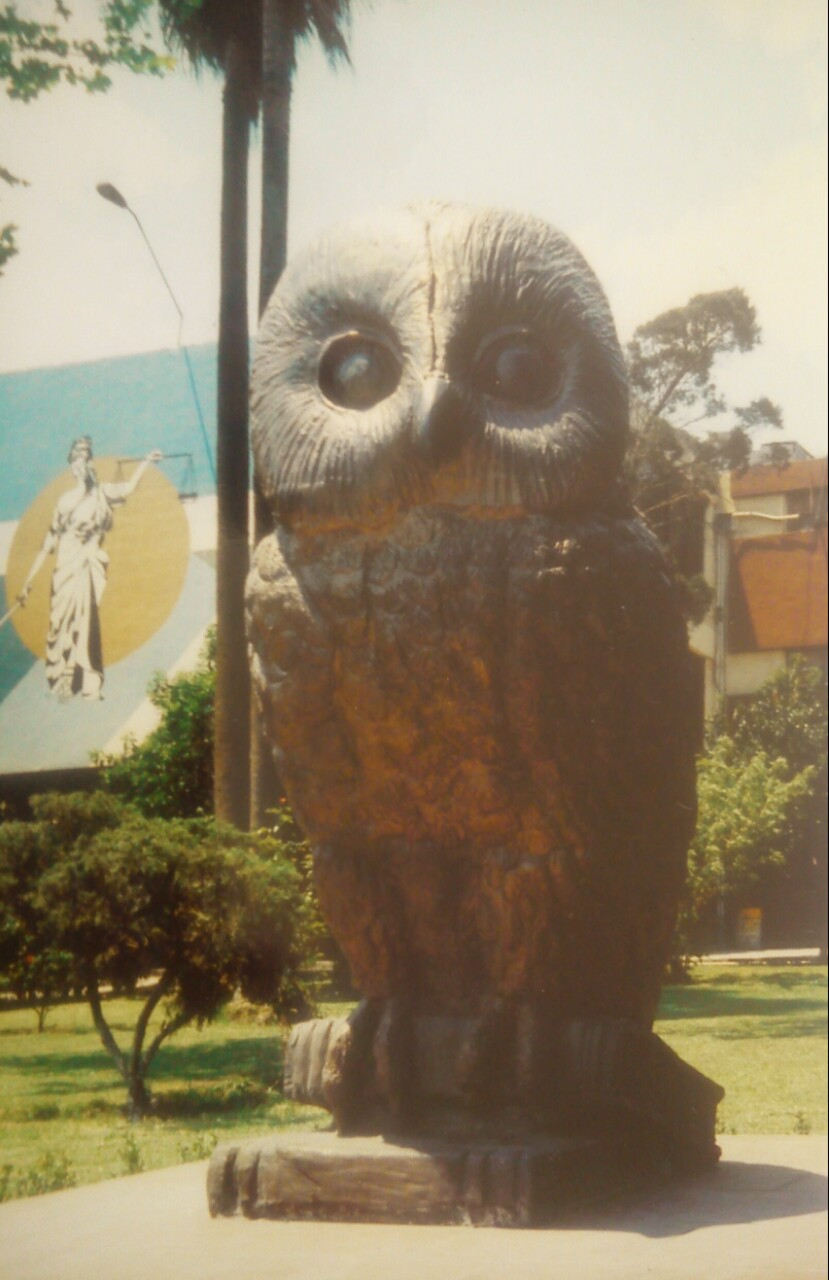
Sculpture inaugurated by governor Sócrates Rizzo García of Nuevo León from 1991 to 1996

=== Politicians ===
Governors

- Jorge Treviño (1985–1991)
- Sócrates Rizzo (1991–1996)
- Fernando Elizondo Barragán (2003)
- José Natividad González Parás (2003–2009)

Federal cabinet secretaries

- Reyes Tamez
- Luis Eugenio Todd Pérez
- María Teresa Herrera
- The industrialist Mauricio Fernández Garza.
- Jose Fernando Garza Cazares

Notable architects

- Cesar Dominguez.
- Jose Said Salazar Almaguer.

=== Sportsmen ===
- Raúl González Olympic medallist
- Luis Rosendo Ramos Maldonado Olympic cyclist and Panamerican medallist
- Elsa García Olympic gymnast
- Mariana Avitia Olympic archer
- Marisela Cantú Olympic gymnast
- José Luis Sánchez Olympic shooter
- Natalia Zamora Olympic shooter
- Paola Longoria #1 Pro-ranking Racquetball player
- Samantha Salas Racquetball player

== See also ==
- XHUNL-FM
- XHMNU-TDT
- Tigres de la UANL
- List of universities in Mexico
