= Superior Court of Justice of Nuevo León =

The Superior Court of Justice of Nuevo León (Spanish: Tribunal Superior de Justicia de Nuevo León) is the judicial branch of government of Nuevo León.

Ministers of the Court are elected by the state congress from a list presented by the governor.

The Superior Court meets in Monterrey in the Superior Court of Justice Building.

== President of the Superior Court ==
The President of the Superior Court of Justice is the presiding magistrate of the Superior Court of Justice of Nuevo León.

Presidents of the Superior Court of Justice of Nuevo León are elected for a term of 2 years with no possibility of reelection. In the past, President of the Court were elected every year with the possibility of being reelected.

=== Recent presidents ===
- Nicolas Díaz Obregón. ?-1996
- María Teresa Herrera Tello. 1996–1999
- Enrique Guzmán Benavides. 1999–2001
- Adolfo Guerrero Gutiérrez. 2001–2003
- Genaro Muñoz Muñoz. 2003–2005
- Jorge Luis Mancillas. 2005–2007
- Gustavo Adolfo Guerrero Gutiérrez. 2007-2009
- Graciela Buchanan Ortega. 2011–2013
- Gustavo Adolfo Guerrero Gutiérrez. 2013–2015
- Carlos Emilio Arenas Bátiz. 2015–present
