= Héctor González González =

Mexican lawyer, politician and writer

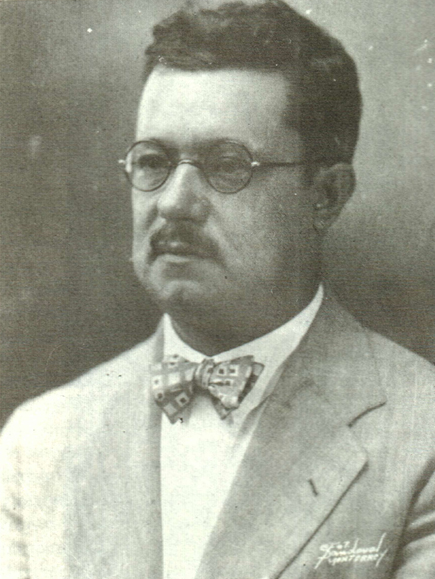
- Born: December 27, 1882; Monterrey, Nuevo León, México
- Died: August 2, 1948 (aged 65); Monterrey, Nuevo León, México
- Occupation: First Rector of Universidad de Nuevo León
- Years active: 1933–1934
- Known for: Journalism; Literary works; Mexican Judicial System; Politics; Academia
- Notable work: El cuervo (The Raven), traducción y estudio del poema de Poe (1920) Siglo y medio de culutra nuevoleonesa (1946)
- Successor: Dr. Ángel Martínez Villarreal
- Spouse: Aida Westrup Barocio
- Children: 6

Héctor González González (December 27, 1882 – August 2, 1948) was a Mexican and regiomontano lawyer, politician, writer, journalist, and intellectual. He was a founder and the first rector of the Universidad Autónoma de Nuevo León.

== Early life and education ==
Héctor González González was born in Monterrey, Nuevo León, on December 27, 1882, the son of José Esteban González Solís, an illustrious regiomontano professor, and Viviana González Melo.

Héctor González González was raised in Cadereyta Jiménez, Nuevo León, where he completed his primary studies. After completing elementary school, González relocated to Monterrey, Nuevo León, to continue his formal education for secondary and preparatory levels in the Colegio Civil in 1898.

During preparatory schooling, González collaborated in the founding of the Sociedad Científico y Literaria “José Eleuterio González” in December 1899, along with Nemesio García Naranjo, Felipe Guerra Castro, Antonio de la Paz Guerra, Galdino P. Quintanilla, Antonio Morales Gómez, Santiago Roel Melo, Joel Rocha Barocio, Fortunato Lozano, and Oswaldo Sánchez.

In 1901, with Jesús de la Garza, poet Oswaldo Sánchez, and professors Fortunato Lozano and Pablo Livas, González participated in the creation of a biweekly publishing, El Pobre Valbuena, in which he wrote articles and essays on the popular literature of the time. In late 1904, he organized the Sociedad Renacimiento, dedicated to the exploring of Decadent literature through poetry. Again working with Pablo Livas, he wrote for the magazine Claro-Obscuro in 1905.

González graduated from Law School in the Escuela de Jurisprudencia de Nuevo León in 1906.

== Professional career ==
After graduating, González was court scribe to the Juzgado 1^{o} and, at the same time, wrote for the magazine Revista Contemporánea in 1909. He was also in charge of the newspaper El Noticiero, and a year later he acquired the Zig–Zag (magazine), which he published with Federico Gómez.

He was the Director for La Opinión and Secretary of the District Court. After this, he was named Private Secretary to the Nuevo León Governor, General José María Mier.

On June 8, 1912, the Ateneo de Monterrey was founded, with González as a founding member and initial President i, and with Enrique Fernández Ledesma as Secretary.

=== Mexico City ===
González and his family moved temporarily to Mexico City. There, he worked as a literature professor at the Escuela Normal Superior until 1915, when he traveled to Veracruz where he boarded a ship to New Orleans from where he then made his way to his short-term destination, San Antonio. Here he was editor of the newspaper La Prensa.

=== Baja California (1916–1920) ===
From San Antonio, Texas, González migrated back south to Mexicali, Baja California to work in Coronel Esteban Cantú's government in 1916. He was first a Trial Judge in Tijuana, and then in Mexicali; in the latter he was also a consulting lawyer and a member of the town council.

In Baja California, he founded the state's first newspaper, La Vanguardia, and published works like El negrito poeta (1918), and his translation and analysis of The Raven by Edgar Allan Poe (1920) in Spanish.

González maintained an active political life by directing the Club Político "Benito Juárez" that he founded with Dr. Ignacio Roel, changing political policies to lower the electricity rates to favor Mexicali citizens, and becoming the Mexicali Municipal Vice President to Coronel Agustín Martínez in 1919. The next year, he was a candidate for District Representative for the only district in Baja California, but the federal elections were suspended in this state days before the elections were supposed to be held.

=== Monterrey, Nuevo León (1920–1923) ===
Héctor González González returned to Monterrey, Nuevo León in 1920 to work on Juan M. García's campaign, and when García won the elections and started his term as Governor of Nuevo León in early 1921, González was his Attorney General. In 1922, González ran for Senator Deputy to the prominent revolutionary, Antonio I. Villarreal, and moved to Mexico City again to collaborate in Luis Cabrera Lobato’s firm. From 1920 to 1924, he was a lead-writer for El Porvenir.

=== Tampico, Tamaulipas (1923–1926) ===
He journeyed north again, this time to Tampico, Tamaulipas, Mexico in 1923, when he was hired as lawyer to the North American petroleum enterprise, Cortez Oil Company. After living in Tampico for only a few months, he was made a criminal Judge.

When Emilio Portes Gil, from the Partido Socialista Fronterizo, was voted Governor of Tamaulipas, González was designated Magistrate and President of the High Court of Justice of Tamaulipas.

=== Monterrey, Nuevo León (1926–) ===
González returned to Monterrey, Nuevo León permanently by the end of 1926, and became a notary public to the state of Nuevo León.e returned to teaching Literature in the Colegio Civil and, in that same year, he published Curso Breve de Literatura (1927). In 1931, he wasappointed Director of the Escuela de Jurisprudencia where he also taught Political economy.

==== Rector of Universidad Autónoma de Nuevo León ====
In 1933, Héctor González González was appointed Vice President of the Comisión Organizadora de la Universidad de Nuevo León, and on December 16 of this year, the commission elected González as First Rector of the UANL.

== Final years ==
After his rectory of the Universidad de Nuevo León, Héctor González González was Chairperson to the Congreso Nacional de Historia in the Aula Magna of the Colegio Civil in December 1937. On June 12, 1943, together with Santiago Roel Melo, Carlos Pérez Maldonado and José P. Saldaña, González formed part of a commission that designed the state of Nuevo León's coat of arms.

González published four works in the forties, the best known being Siglo y medio de cultura nuevoleonesa (1946).

== Personal life ==
González married British-Italian Aida Westrup Barocio in 1906, and the couple had six children: Alicia (died in infancy), Ruy, Sol (also died in infancy), Esteban, Héctor Pablo, and Fernán González Westrup.

González died from a heart attack on August 2, 1948, in Monterrey, Nuevo León.

== Works ==
- Biografía de Fray Servando Teresa de Mier (1910)
- Estudios literarios (1911)
- El negrito poeta mexicano (1918)
- El cuervo (The Raven), traducción y estudio del poema de Poe (1920)
- Curso Breve de Literatura (1927)
- Historia General de la Literatura (1931)
- Universidad de Nuevo León, testimonio de fundación (1933)
- Historia del Colegio Civil (1945)
- Historia y Bibliografía del estado de Nuevo León de 1820 a 1946 (1946)
- Siglo y medio de cultura nuevoleonesa (1946)
- Tres libros acerca del Emperador Maximiliano (1947)

== Bibliography ==
- Covarrubias, R. (2002). Datos biográficos: Héctor González, Celedonio Junco de la Vega (in Spanish). p. 19. Monterrey: Universidad Autónoma de Nuevo León.
- Flores Longoria, S. (2005). El espíritu del derecho en Nuevo León (in Spanish). Monterrey: Facultad de Derecho y Criminología, UANL.
- Salinas Quiroga, G. (1956). Elocuencia nuevoleonesa (in Spanish). P. 141. Monterrey: Universidad Autónoma de Nuevo León.
