= Liu Rui (taekwondo) =

Chinese taekwondo practitioner

Personal information
- Nationality: Chinese
- Born: 6 January 1987 (age 39)

Sport
- Sport: Taekwondo
Medal record
Representing China
Women's taekwondo
World Championships
Silver medal – second place	2009 Copenhagen	Heavyweight
Bronze medal – third place	2005 Madrid	Heavyweight
Asian Games
Gold medal – first place	2010 Guangzhou	+73 kg

Liu Rui (born 6 January 1987) is a Chinese taekwondo practitioner.

She won a bronze medal in heavyweight at the 2005 World Taekwondo Championships, and a silver medal at the 2009 World Taekwondo Championships in Copenhagen. She won a gold medal at the 2010 Asian Games.
