= Noha Abd Rabo =

Egyptian taekwondo practitioner

Noha Safwat Hafez Abd Rabo (Arabic: نهى صفوت حافظ عبد ربه; born January 2, 1987) is an Egyptian taekwondo practitioner. Abd Rabo qualified for the women's heavyweight class (+67 kg) at the 2008 Summer Olympics in Beijing, after winning the championship title from the African Qualification Tournament in Tripoli, Libya. She lost the preliminary round of sixteen match to Norway's Nina Solheim, with a score of 3–9. Because her opponent advanced further into the final match, Abd Rabo took advantage of the repechage round by defeating Malaysia's Che Chew Chan. She progressed to the bronze medal match, but narrowly lost the medal to Great Britain's Sarah Stevenson, with a score of 1–5.
