= Khaoula Ben Hamza =

Tunisian taekwondo practitioner

Khaoula Ben Hamza (born 18 May 1991 in Tunis) is a Tunisian taekwondo practitioner. She competed in the +67 kg event at the 2012 Summer Olympics and was eliminated by Anastasia Baryshnikova in the preliminary round. She also competed at the 2008 Summer Olympics, in the same category, losing to eventual gold medallist Maria Espinoza in the first round. Because Espinoza reached the final, Ben Hamza was entered into the repechage, where she lost to Karolina Kedzierska.
