= Natália Falavigna =

Brazilian taekwondo practitioner (born 1984)

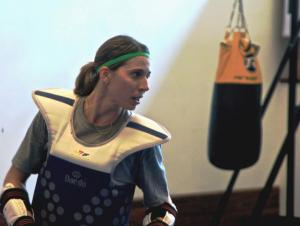

Personal information
- Born: 9 May 1984 (age 42) Maringá, PR, Brazil
Medal record
Women's taekwondo
Representing Brazil
Olympic Games
| Bronze medal – third place | 2008 Beijing | +67 kg |
World Championships
| Gold medal – first place | 2005 Madrid | −72 kg |
| Bronze medal – third place | 2001 Jeju | −63 kg |
| Bronze medal – third place | 2007 Beijing | −72 kg |
| Bronze medal – third place | 2009 Copenhagen | +73 kg |
Pan American Games
| Silver medal – second place | 2007 Rio de Janeiro | +67 kg |
South American Games
| Gold medal – first place | 2002 Rio de Janeiro | −72 kg |
| Silver medal – second place | 2014 Santiago | +67 kg |
Summer Universiade
| Gold medal – first place | 2009 Belgrade | +72 kg |
| Silver medal – second place | 2003 Daegu | −72 kg |

Natália Falavigna da Silva (born 9 May 1984 in Maringá) is a taekwondo athlete from Brazil. She finished in the fourth place in the women's 67-kilogram category in taekwondo at the 2004 Summer Olympics on 26 August, and won the bronze medal at the 2008 Summer Olympics. It was the first Brazilian Olympic medal ever in taekwondo.

== Personal life ==
Falavigna was born in Maringá, and grew up in another city in the Paraná state, Londrina. At the age of four, she saw judoka Aurélio Miguel win a gold medal in the 1988 Summer Olympics and was inspired to become an athlete. She practiced volleyball, basketball, soccer, swimming, and the first she dedicated the most, handball. In 1998, Falavigna was introduced by a friend to taekwondo, and while the first classes were "by impulse", the coach said Falavigna had potential and could become world champion. Two years later, she won the World Junior Taekwondo Championships in Ireland, becoming the first Brazilian to do so. In the four years that followed, Falavigna ended up on the top three in 9 of the 11 international competitions she entered. In 2003, Falavigna entered a state of depression and even considered trading taekwondo for tennis, but found a new strength to the sport after winning silver at the 2003 Summer Universiade.

== Achievements ==
Natália Falavigna won the following competitions:

- World Taekwondo Championship: 2005
- World University Taekwondo Championship: 2006
- World Junior Taekwondo Championship: 2000

== Awards ==
Falavigna won the Brazilian Olympic Award's Women's Best Athlete of the Year in 2005, and also won the 2002, 2003, 2004, 2005, 2006, 2008, and 2009 Best Taekwondo Athlete.

== Career ==
=== 2000 World Junior Taekwondo Championship ===
In 2000, two years after starting practicing taekwondo, Falavigna won the World Youth Taekwondo Championship, held in Killarney, Republic of Ireland. It was the first international tournament that she participated in.

=== 2001 World Taekwondo Championship ===
In 2001, in the World Taekwondo Championship held in Jeju, South Korea, Natália Falavigna won the bronze medal.

=== 2004 Summer Olympics ===
Natália Falavigna competed for the first time in the Olympics in 2004, when she finished in the fourth place in the competition. She was defeated in the semifinal by Chinese Chen Zhong. In the Repechage semifinals she defeated Italian Daniela Castrignano, but was beaten by Venezuelan Adriana Carmona in the bronze medal match.

=== 2005 World Taekwondo Championship ===
In 2005, in Madrid, Spain, Natália Falavigna defeated British Sarah Stevenson in the final, and won the World Taekwondo Championship.

=== 2007 World Taekwondo Championship ===
Falavigna won the bronze medal in the 2007 World Taekwondo Championship held in Beijing, China.

=== 2007 Pan American Games ===
Natália Falavigna performed the oath of the athletes at the opening ceremony of the Fifteenth Pan American Games in Rio de Janeiro.

She won the silver medal at the women's +67-kilogram category. Falavigna defeated Venezuelan Aura Paez in the semifinals, but was defeated by Mexican María del Rosario Espinoza in the gold medal match.

=== 2008 Summer Olympics ===
The 2008 Olympic Games, held in Beijing, China, was Natália Falavigna's second participation in the Olympics. In the first stage, she defeated 3–1 the Greek Kyriaki Kouvari. In the quarterfinals, Natália Falavigna beat the Australian Carmen Marton 5–2, but she was defeated by Nina Solheim of Norway in the semifinals. Falavigna won the bronze medal after beating the Swedish Karolina Kedzierska 5–2 in the bronze medal match of the Repechage. Natália Falavigna's bronze medal was Brazil's first Olympic medal ever in taekwondo.

=== 2009 World Taekwondo Championship ===
In 2009, in the World Taekwondo Championship held in Copenhagen, Denmark, Natália Falavigna won the bronze medal.

Awards
| Preceded by Daiane dos Santos | Brazilian Sportswomen of the Year; 2005 | Succeeded by Laís Souza |
