= Natalia Zamora =

Mexican sport shooter

Personal information
- Full name: Natalia Zamora

Sport
- Coached by: Roberto José Elias

Natalia Zamora Lara (born July 10, 1987, in Ciudad Victoria, Tamaulipas) is a Mexican sport shooter. Zamora represented Mexico at the 2008 Summer Olympics in Beijing, where she competed in the women's 50 m rifle 3 positions. She was able to shoot 193 targets in a prone position, 190 in standing, and 186 in kneeling, for a total score of 569 points, finishing only in thirty-sixth place.
