= Evgeniya Karimova =

Uzbekistani taekwondo practitioner (born 1989)

Personal information
- Nationality: Uzbekistan
- Born: 12 June 1989 (age 37)
- Height: 1.76 m (5 ft 9 1/2 in)
- Weight: 73 kg (161 lb)

Sport
- Sport: Taekwondo
- Event: +67 kg
Medal record
Representing Uzbekistan
Women's taekwondo
Asian Games
Silver medal – second place	2006 Doha	Heavyweight
Bronze medal – third place	2010 Guangzhou	Heavyweight
Asian Championships
Silver medal – second place	2010 Astana	Heavyweight

Evgeniya Sergeevna Karimova (Uzbek: Евгения Сергеевна Каримова; born June 12, 1989) is an Uzbekistani taekwondo practitioner. She won a silver medal for the heavyweight category at the 2006 Asian Games in Doha, Qatar, losing out to two-time Olympic champion Chen Zhong of China in the final match. She also shared her bronze medal position with Jordan's Nadin Dawani at the 2010 Asian Games in Guangzhou, China.

Karimova represented Uzbekistan at the 2008 Summer Olympics in Beijing, where she played for the women's heavyweight category (+67 kg). She lost the first preliminary match by a decisive point and a double defensive kick from Malaysia's Che Chew Chan in the final round, with a score of 4–5.
