= Lee In-jong =

South Korean taekwondo practitioner

Medal record

Women's taekwondo

Representing South Korea

World Championships
| Silver medal – second place | 2007 Beijing | Middleweight |
| Silver medal – second place | 2009 Copenhagen | Middleweight |
| Silver medal – second place | 2013 Puebla | Middleweight |

Asian Championships
| Gold medal – first place | 2012 Ho Chi Minh City | Middleweight |

Lee In-Jong (Korean: 이인종, born August 2, 1982) is a South Korean female taekwondo practitioner. She is a three-time World Championship middleweight silver medalist.

Lee did not qualify for the 2008 Olympics losing to Hwang Kyung-Seon, who eventually won the Olympic gold medal in the women's under 67 kg division in Beijing, in the South Korean National Trials.

As a middleweight (under 73 kg), Lee clinched her slot in the women's over 67 kg division 2012 Olympic South Korean National Trials where she beat 2011 World Championship runner-up An Sae-Bom and 2007 World Championship runner-up Park Hye-Mi. At the Olympics, she lost in her bronze medal bout to Anastasia Baryshnikova.
