= Sarah Stevenson =

English taekwondo practitioner (born 1983)

Sarah Stevenson MBE
Personal information
- Full name: Sarah Diana Stevenson
- Born: 30 March 1983 (age 43) Doncaster, South Yorkshire, England
Medal record
Women's taekwondo
Representing Great Britain
Olympic Games
Bronze medal – third place	2008 Beijing	+67 kg
World Championships
Gold medal – first place	2001 Jeju	Middleweight
Gold medal – first place	2011 Gyeongju	Welterweight
Silver medal – second place	2005 Madrid	Middleweight
European Championships
Gold medal – first place	1998 Eindhoven	Middleweight
Gold medal – first place	2005 Riga	Middleweight
Gold medal – first place	2006 Bonn	Middleweight
Gold medal – first place	2010 St. Petersburg	Welterweight
Silver medal – second place	2002 Samsun	Middleweight
Silver medal – second place	2004 Lillehammer	Heavyweight

Sarah Diana Stevenson MBE (born 30 March 1983) is a British taekwondo athlete.

A world champion in 2001, Stevenson won her country's first ever Olympic medal in taekwondo, a bronze, at the 2008 Games in Beijing, her third Olympic competition for Great Britain. Controversially eliminated before the medal rounds, she was reinstated following appeal and went on to win the bronze medal final.

Stevenson again became world champion in 2011, despite the loss of both her parents to cancer in the preceding year.

Stevenson was selected for her home games in London in 2012, where she took the Olympic oath at the opening ceremony on behalf of all the athletes. Her injury-truncated build up to the Games led to an early elimination; she had taken silver at the Olympic qualifiers despite suffering a broken hand.

In 2013, Stevenson announced her retirement from competition, and her intention to take up a coaching role in the Great Britain team.

== Early life ==
Stevenson was born in Doncaster and attended the Don Valley High School in Scawthorpe. She started training taekwondo at the age of 7.

== Career ==
Stevenson started her career by becoming Junior World Champion in 1998. In 2000, she won the 3rd place in taekwondo at the 2000 Summer Olympics's World Qualification Tournament and qualified for the 2000 Summer Olympics in Women's 67 kg. These achievements won her fame and drew the attention of martial arts superstar Jackie Chan who sponsored her while promoting his film Shanghai Noon in the United Kingdom. But in the 2000 Olympics she lost to Norway's Trude Gundersen in the semifinal and Japan's Yoriko Okamoto in the bronze match. The next year, she became a world champion in the 2001 World Taekwondo Championships's Women's Middleweight, defeating 2000 Summer Olympics gold medalist Chen Zhong in the final. She became the first British Taekwondo World champion.

At the 2004 Olympics in the Women's +67 kg event she was eliminated by Venezuela's Adriana Carmona in the first round. She later trained at Sportcity in Manchester and is a member of the Allstars Taekwondo Academy in Doncaster. She was coached by Master Gary Sykes.

=== 2008 Olympics ===
Due to an "error" in judging, Stevenson almost exited the 2008 Summer Olympics in the quarterfinal stage following her match with China's Chen Zhong, the gold medal favourite. In the final round of the match, the judges failed to award Stevenson two points for a high-kick to the head, which would have put her one point in the lead with 10 seconds remaining. Following the match, the British team representative immediately made an official protest and, after studying video footage of the kick the judges reversed the result of the fight and Stevenson progressed to the semifinal. Stevenson's semifinal opponent was María del Rosario Espinoza of Mexico, and she lost 4–1, also sustaining a twisted ankle. She then went on to compete for bronze in the repechage, defeating Noha Abd Rabo of Egypt and winning Britain's first Olympic medal in the sport of taekwondo.

On announcing the change of result in the quarter final, the tournament director said:

"The competition supervisory board has looked into this matter deeply, has made video analysis which has been open to all the referees and judges. In applying paragraph two of page 64 of the competition rules of the World Taekwondo Federation we have to change this result and we have to declare the British player as winner. We are very sorry to the spectators of China but justice is first. Thank you for understanding."

As a result of this judging error in particular, emphasis may be switching to having electronic scoring equipment contained within the actual body protectors themselves, and many tournaments are now using these in trial phase. However, since this technology is far from refined, and due to tactical differences needed in gameplay and style, Stevenson, and athletes from other National Teams, currently do not favour this system and often boycott such tournaments.

=== 2012 Olympics ===
At the opening ceremony of the 2012 Summer Olympics, Sarah Stevenson was chosen to take the Competitors oath. She lost to American Paige McPherson in the preliminary round.

=== Career highlights ===
- 2011 World Taekwondo Championships: Gold
- 2010 European Championships: Gold
- 2009 British Open International: Gold
- 2008 Summer Olympics: Bronze
- 2006 Commonwealth Taekwondo Championships: Gold
- 2005 World Taekwondo Championships: Silver
- 2005 European Championships: Gold
- 2004 European Championships: Gold
- 2004 Summer Olympics: 15th
- 2001 World Taekwondo Championships: Gold
- 2000 Summer Olympics: 4th
- 1998 European Championships: Gold

== Personal life ==
Stevenson was appointed Member of the Order of the British Empire (MBE) in the 2012 New Year Honours for services to martial arts.

In January 2014, Stevenson was made a Freeman of her home town of Doncaster.
