= María Espinoza =

Mexican taekwondo practitioner

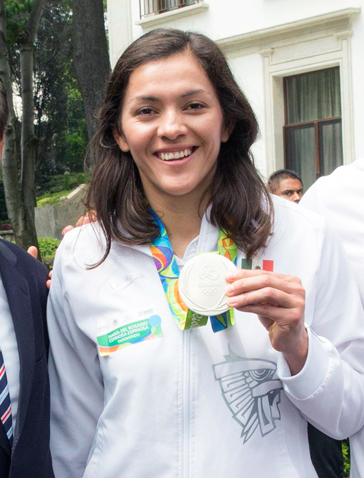
- Espinoza with her silver medal from the 2016 Summer Olympics

Personal information
- Full name: María del Rosario Espinoza Espinoza
- Nickname: Chayito
- Nationality: Mexico
- Born: 27 November 1987 (age 38) La Brecha, Sinaloa, Mexico
- Height: 1.73 m (5 ft 8 in)
- Weight: 70 kg (154 lb)

Sport
- Sport: Taekwondo
Medal record
Women's taekwondo
Representing Mexico
Olympic Games
Gold medal – first place	2008 Beijing	+67 kg
Silver medal – second place	2016 Rio de Janeiro	+67 kg
Bronze medal – third place	2012 London	+67 kg
World Championships
Gold medal – first place	2007 Beijing	-72 kg
Silver medal – second place	2019 Manchester	-73 kg
Bronze medal – third place	2017 Muju	-73 kg
Pan American Games
Gold medal – first place	2007 Rio de Janeiro	+67 kg
Silver medal – second place	2015 Toronto	+67 kg
Central American and Caribbean Games
Gold medal – first place	2010 Mayagüez	-73 kg
Gold medal – first place	2014 Veracruz	-73 kg
Bronze medal – third place	2006 Cartagena	-67 kg
World Taekwondo Grand Prix
Silver medal – second place	2014 Querétaro	+67 kg
Silver medal – second place	2015 CDMX	+67 kg
Bronze medal – third place	2018 Manchester	+67 kg
Bronze medal – third place	2019 Chiba	+67 kg

María del Rosario Espinoza Espinoza (born 27 November 1987) is a Mexican taekwondo practitioner.

Espinoza is one of the two women from Mexico who have won an Olympic gold medal, the other being Soraya Jiménez.

== Early life ==
Espinoza was born on 27 November 1987 in La Brecha, Sinaloa. Her father is a fisherman and mother a homemaker. She began practicing taekwondo at age five.

== Career ==
Espinoza won her first international competition in taekwondo at the 2003 Pan American Youth Championship in Rio de Janeiro. Later she participated in Open tournaments in Canada, France, and Germany.

She won the 2007 World Taekwondo Championships in the Middleweight (–72 kg) category defeating Lee In-Jong and also won the gold medal at the 2007 Pan American Games in the Heavyweight (+67 kg) category, defeating Brazilian Natália Falavigna in the final.

She participated in the +67 kg weight class at the 2008 Beijing Olympics. She began with a victory over Tunisian Khaoula Ben Hamza by a score of 4–0, later she beat Swedish Karolina Kedzierska 4–2. In the semifinals she qualified for the final by defeating British former world champion and eventual bronze medal winner Sarah Stevenson 4-1 and culminated in winning the gold medal by beating Norwegian Nina Solheim 3–1, earning the second gold for Mexico at the 2008 Olympics.

In 2012, María returned to the Olympics in London. She carried the flag for Mexico during the Parade of Nations and won a bronze medal. She beat Sorn Davin in the first round before losing to eventual gold medallist Milica Mandić in the quarterfinals. In the repechage, she beat Talitiga Crawley before winning her bronze medal match against Glenhis Hernández.

In Rio 2016, Espinoza won a silver medal to become the first female Mexican athlete to earn an Olympic medal in three different Olympic Games, and the second Mexican athlete to earn Olympic medals in three consecutive editions. She carried Mexico's flag at the closing ceremony in 2016.

María Espinoza won second place in the Taekwondo world championships in Manchester on 16 May 2019.

=== Military ===
Espinoza is a member of the Mexican Army with the rank of Cabo (Corporal) auxiliar de Educación Física y Deportes. Top athletes have joined the military for the stable income and access to the best training facilities. For the 2016 Rio Olympics, 21 of the 125 Mexican athletes were part of the military. Four of the five medals won at those games were won by military personnel (María Espinoza, Germán Sánchez, Ismael Hernández and Lupita González).

=== Education ===
Espinoza studied business administration at the Universidad del Valle de Mexico. She was inducted into the university's Sports Hall of Fame.

Olympic Games
Preceded by Hubertus von Fürstenberg-von Hohenlohe	Flagbearer for Mexico; London 2012	Succeeded by Hubertus von Fürstenberg-von Hohenlohe
