= Karolina Kedzierska =

Swedish taekwondo practitioner

Medal record

Representing Sweden

Women's taekwondo

European Championships
Gold medal – first place	2008 Rome	Heavyweight
Silver medal – second place	2006 Bonn	Heavyweight

Karolina Kedzierska (born 14 September 1987 in Malmö) is a Swedish female Taekwondo practitioner. She started to learn taekwondo 1997. Kedzierska competed at 2008 Summer Olympics, where she lost to Natália Falavigna of Brazil in the Bronze Medal match.

Kedzierska lives in Malmö and competes for GAK Enighet.
