= Nina Solheim =

Norwegian taekwondoin (b. 1979)

Medal record

Representing Norway

Women's taekwondo

Olympic Games
| Silver medal – second place | 2008 Beijing | +67 kg |

World Championships
| Bronze medal – third place | 2001 Jeju | Welterweight |

European Championships
| Bronze medal – third place | 2006 Bonn | Welterweight |
| Bronze medal – third place | 2008 Rome | Middleweight |

Nina Solheim (born 4 August 1979) is a Norwegian taekwondo practitioner. She won a silver medal in the women's heavyweight (+67 kg) division at the 2008 Summer Olympics in Beijing, beaten by Mexican María del Rosario Espinoza in the final. She also qualified and competed in the women's middleweight (67 kg) division at the 2004 Summer Olympics in Athens. She lost in the quarterfinals against Luo Wei of China after injuring her knee.

In addition to a bronze medal from the 2001 World Taekwondo Championships in Jeju, South Korea, Solheim won the gold medal in middleweight (72 kg) at the 2006 World Cup in Bangkok, Thailand.

Solheim is a well known athlete in Norway. She was born in South Korea, and at the age of seven months, she and her twin sister Mona were adopted by Norwegian parents, growing up in Namsos Municipality.
