= Thailand at the 2008 Summer Olympics =

- IOC code: THA
- NOC: National Olympic Committee of Thailand
- Website: www.olympicthai.or.th (in Thai and English)

in Beijing
- Competitors: 51 in 13 sports
- Flag bearers: Worapoj Petchkoom (opening); Somjit Jongjohor (closing)
- Medals Ranked 30th: Gold 2 Silver 2 Bronze 2 Total 6

Summer Olympics appearances (overview)
- 1952; 1956; 1960; 1964; 1968; 1972; 1976; 1980; 1984; 1988; 1992; 1996; 2000; 2004; 2008; 2012; 2016; 2020; 2024

Thailand competed in the 2008 Summer Olympics, held in Beijing, People's Republic of China, from August 8 to August 24, 2008.

== Medalists ==
Medal	Name	Sport	Event	Date
Gold	Somjit Jongjohor	Boxing	Flyweight	August 23
Gold	Prapawadee Jaroenrattanatarakoon	Weightlifting	Women's 53 kg	August 10
Silver	Buttree Puedpong	Taekwondo	Women's 49 kg	August 20
Silver	Manus Boonjumnong	Boxing	Light welterweight	August 23
Bronze	Pensiri Laosirikul	Weightlifting	Women's 48 kg	August 9
Bronze	Wandee Kameaim	Weightlifting	Women's 58 kg	August 11

== Athletics ==
Key

- Note–Ranks given for track events are within the athlete's heat only
- Q = Qualified for the next round
- q = Qualified for the next round as a fastest loser or, in field events, by position without achieving the qualifying target
- NR = National record
- N/A = Round not applicable for the event
- Bye = Athlete not required to compete in round

Men
Track & road events

Athlete	Event	Heat		Final	
Athlete	Event	Result	Rank	Result	Rank
Siriroj Darasuriyong; Sompote Suwannarangsri; Sittichai Suwonprateep; Wachara Sondee	4 × 100 m relay	39.40	5	Did not advance	

Women
Track & road events

Athlete	Event	Heat		Quarterfinal		Semifinal		Final	
Athlete	Event	Result	Rank	Result	Rank	Result	Rank	Result	Rank
Jutamass Tawoncharoen	100 m	11.82	8	Did not advance					
Sangwan Jaksunin; Oranut Klomdee; Nongnuch Sanrat; Jutamass Tawoncharoen	4 × 100 m relay	44.38	5	—				Did not advance	

Field events

Athlete	Event	Qualification		Final	
Athlete	Event	Distance	Position	Distance	Position
Noengrothai Chaipetch	High jump	1.80	29	Did not advance	
Buoban Pamang	Javelin throw	56.35	28	Did not advance	

Combined events – Heptathlon

Athlete	Event	100H	HJ	SP	200 m	LJ	JT	800 m	Final	Rank
Wassana Winatho	Result	13.93	1.68	DNS	—	—	—	—	DNF	
Wassana Winatho	Points	988	830	0	—	—	—	—	DNF	

== Badminton ==
Athlete	Event	Round of 64	Round of 32	Round of 16	Quarterfinal	Semifinal	Final / BM	
Athlete	Event	Opposition Score	Opposition Score	Opposition Score	Opposition Score	Opposition Score	Opposition Score	Rank
Boonsak Ponsana	Men's singles	Bye	Kuncoro (INA); L (16–21, 14–21)	Did not advance				
Salakjit Ponsana	Women's singles	Bye	Zhang N (CHN); L (23–21, 17–21, 7–21)	Did not advance				
Sudket Prapakamol; Saralee Thungthongkam	Mixed doubles	—		Beres / Loker (CAN); W (21–9, 21–9)	Widianto / Natsir (INA); L (13–21, 19–21)	Did not advance		

== Boxing ==
Thailand qualified eight boxers for the Olympic boxing tournament. Five boxers qualified by placing in the top eight at the 2007 World Championships. Petchkoom, Manus Boonjumnong, and Chomphuphuang qualified at the first Asian qualifier.

Athlete	Event	Round of 32	Round of 16	Quarterfinals	Semifinals	Final	
Athlete	Event	Opposition Result	Opposition Result	Opposition Result	Opposition Result	Opposition Result	Rank
Amnat Ruanroeng	Light flyweight	Willie (PNG); W 14–2	Montero (DOM); W 7–3	Serdamba (MGL); L 2–5	Did not advance		
Somjit Jongjohor	Flyweight	Valenzuela (GUA); W 6–1	Mammadov (AZE); W 10–2	Yunusov (TJK); W 8–1	Picardi (ITA); W 7–1	Laffita (CUB); W 8–2	1st place, gold medalist(s)
Worapoj Petchkoom	Bantamweight	Bye	Parrinello (ITA); W 12:1	León (CUB); L 2–10	Did not advance		
Sailom Adi	Featherweight	Bye	Chadi (ALG); L 6–7	Did not advance			
Pichai Sayotha	Lightweight	Bye	Baik J-S (KOR); L 4–10	Did not advance			
Manus Boonjumnong	Light welterweight	Bye	Kawachi (JPN); W 8–1	Sapiyev (KAZ); W 7–5	Iglesias (CUB); W 10–5	Díaz (DOM); L 4–12	2nd place, silver medalist(s)
Non Boonjumnong	Welterweight	Bye	Abdin (EGY); L 10–11	Did not advance			
Angkhan Chomphuphuang	Middleweight	Cho D-J (KOR); W 9–3	Kumar (IND); L 3–13	Did not advance			

== Cycling ==
Athlete	Event	Time	Rank
Chanpeng Nontasin	Women's road race	3:51:51	61

== Fencing ==
Men

Athlete	Event	Round of 64	Round of 32	Round of 16	Quarterfinal	Semifinal	Final / BM	
Athlete	Event	Opposition Score	Opposition Score	Opposition Score	Opposition Score	Opposition Score	Opposition Score	Rank
Nontapat Panchan	Individual foil	—	Mocek (POL); L 7–15	Did not advance				
Wiradech Kothny	Individual sabre	Bye	Zhong M (CHN); L 7–15	Did not advance				

== Sailing ==
Men

Athlete	Event	Race											Net points	Final rank
Athlete	Event	1	2	3	4	5	6	7	8	9	10	M*	Net points	Final rank
Ek Boonsawad	RS:X	19	15	28	25	19	24	~~33~~	20	27	26	EL	203	25

Women

Athlete	Event	Race											Net points	Final rank
Athlete	Event	1	2	3	4	5	6	7	8	9	10	M*	Net points	Final rank
Napalai Tansai	RS:X	16	17	18	~~24~~	8	22	19	23	23	23	EL	169	20

M = Medal race; EL = Eliminated – did not advance into the medal race; CAN = Race cancelled

== Shooting ==
Men

Athlete	Event	Qualification		Final	
Athlete	Event	Points	Rank	Points	Rank
Jakkrit Panichpatikum	10 m air pistol	581	7 Q	679.0	7
Jakkrit Panichpatikum	50 m pistol	549	30	Did not advance	

Women

Athlete	Event	Qualification		Final	
Athlete	Event	Points	Rank	Points	Rank
Thanyalak Chotphibunsin	10 m air rifle	388	40	Did not advance	
Thanyalak Chotphibunsin	50 m rifle 3 positions	569	35	Did not advance	
Sasithorn Hongprasert	10 m air rifle	390	36	Did not advance	
Sasithorn Hongprasert	50 m rifle 3 positions	565	41	Did not advance	
Tanyaporn Prucksakorn	10 m air pistol	380	20	Did not advance	
Tanyaporn Prucksakorn	25 m pistol	582	8 Q	777.7	7
Sutiya Jiewchaloemmit	Skeet	71	2 Q	92	5

== Swimming ==
Women

Athlete	Event	Heat		Semifinal		Final	
Athlete	Event	Time	Rank	Time	Rank	Time	Rank
Natthanan Junkrajang	100 m freestyle	56.56	39	Did not advance			
Natthanan Junkrajang	200 m freestyle	2:02.88	38	Did not advance			
Natthanan Junkrajang	400 m freestyle	DNS		—		Did not advance	
Nimitta Thaveesupsoonthorn	400 m individual medley	5:02.18	37	—		Did not advance	

== Table tennis ==
Athlete	Event	Preliminary round	Round 1	Round 2	Round 3	Round 4	Quarterfinals	Semifinals	Final / BM	
Athlete	Event	Opposition Result	Opposition Result	Opposition Result	Opposition Result	Opposition Result	Opposition Result	Opposition Result	Opposition Result	Rank
Nanthana Komwong	Women's singles	Bye	Lian Q (DOM); W 4–1	Fukuoka (JPN); L 0–4	Did not advance					

== Taekwondo ==
Athlete	Event	Round of 16	Quarterfinals	Semifinals	Repechage	Bronze Medal	Final	
Athlete	Event	Opposition Result	Opposition Result	Opposition Result	Opposition Result	Opposition Result	Opposition Result	Rank
Chutchawal Khawlaor	Men's −58 kg	Ogoudjobi (BEN); W 4–2	Carneli (AUS); W 2–0	Pérez (MEX); L 1–3	Bye	Chu M-Y (TPE); L 2–4	Did not advance	5
Buttree Puedpong	Women's −49 kg	Montejo (CUB); W 1–0	Tran (VIE); W 2–1	Contreras (VEN); W 2–2 SUP	Bye		Wu Jy (CHN); L (−1)–1	2nd place, silver medalist(s)
Chonnapas Premwaew	Women's −57 kg	López (USA); L 0–2	Did not advance					11

== Tennis ==
Athlete	Event	Round of 64	Round of 32	Round of 16	Quarterfinals	Semifinals	Final / BM	
Athlete	Event	Opposition Score	Opposition Score	Opposition Score	Opposition Score	Opposition Score	Opposition Score	Rank
Tamarine Tanasugarn	Women's singles	Arvidsson (SWE); L 2–6, 1–6	Did not advance					33

== Weightlifting ==
Men

Athlete	Event	Snatch		Clean & Jerk		Total	Rank
Athlete	Event	Result	Rank	Result	Rank	Total	Rank
Pongsak Maneetong	−56 kg	116	10	142	10	258	10
Phaisan Hansawong	−62 kg	132	7	162	5	294	5
Sitthisak Suphalak	−69 kg	147	5	171	11	318	8

Women

Athlete	Event	Snatch		Clean & Jerk		Total	Rank
Athlete	Event	Result	Rank	Result	Rank	Total	Rank
Pramsiri Bunphithak	−48 kg	~~84~~	DNF	—	—	—	DNF
Pensiri Laosirikul	−48 kg	85	4	110	4	195	3rd place, bronze medalist(s)
Prapawadee Jaroenrattanatarakoon	−53 kg	95	1	126 OR	1	221 OR	1st place, gold medalist(s)
Wandee Kameaim	−58 kg	98	3	128	4	226	3rd place, bronze medalist(s)

== See also ==
- Thailand at the 2008 Summer Paralympics
