= Kenya at the 2008 Summer Olympics =

- IOC code: KEN
- NOC: National Olympic Committee of Kenya
- Website: teamkenya.or.ke

in Beijing
- Competitors: 48 in 5 sports
- Flag bearer: Grace Momanyi
- Medals Ranked 13th: Gold 6 Silver 4 Bronze 6 Total 16

Summer Olympics appearances (overview)
- 1956; 1960; 1964; 1968; 1972; 1976–1980; 1984; 1988; 1992; 1996; 2000; 2004; 2008; 2012; 2016; 2020; 2024

Kenya competed in the 2008 Summer Olympics held in Beijing, People's Republic of China from August 8 to August 24, 2008. Kenya won a total of 16 medals, 6 of them gold, its best ever performance at the Olympics.

Kenya sent a total of 46 athletes, 28 men and 18 women, to the 2008 Summer Olympics. Four Kenyan men won six gold medals, while the other two were awarded to the women. The remaining medals won by Kenyans were four silver and six bronze medals. Among the nation's gold medalists was Brimin Kipruto, who brought home the nation's seventh straight medal in the steeplechase since 1984. Coming in at a close third was Richard Matelong who was unable to surpass the Frenchman Mahiedine Mekhissi-Benabbad. Kenya also marked its Olympic debut in taekwondo by sending two athletes, one man and one woman. For the first time in Olympic history, the Kenyan athletes had participated in the women's 800 meter event final. Shortly after the 3,000 meter steeplechase, the women captured a gold medal against many odds. Along with the gold, they also took home the silver as well. Pamela Jelimo led her fellow Kenyan Janeth Jepkosgei Busienei to a one-two finish.

Marathon runner Samuel Wanjiru did not only bring home the gold medal for the Kenyans, but also broke the 24-year-old Olympic record set by Carlos Lopes.

The Kenyans finished the Olympics being the most successful African country in the Beijing Olympics, and 13th place in the overall country standings.

== Medalists ==
Medal	Name	Sport	Event
Gold	Pamela Jelimo	Athletics	Women's 800 m
Gold	Brimin Kipruto	Athletics	Men's 3000 m steeplechase
Gold	Wilfred Bungei	Athletics	Men's 800 m
Gold	Nancy Lagat	Athletics	Women's 1500 m
Gold	Samuel Wanjiru	Athletics	Men's marathon
Gold	Asbel Kiprop	Athletics	Men's 1500 m
Silver	Janeth Jepkosgei	Athletics	Women's 800 m
Silver	Catherine Ndereba	Athletics	Women's marathon
Silver	Eunice Jepkorir	Athletics	Women's 3000 m steeplechase
Silver	Eliud Kipchoge	Athletics	Men's 5000 m
Bronze	Richard Mateelong	Athletics	Men's 3000 m steeplechase
Bronze	Micah Kogo	Athletics	Men's 10,000 m
Bronze	Alfred Kirwa Yego	Athletics	Men's 800 m
Bronze	Edwin Cheruiyot Soi	Athletics	Men's 5000 m
Bronze	Sylvia Kibet	Athletics	Women's 5000 metres
Bronze	Linet Masai	Athletics	Women's 10000 metres

== Athletics ==
The following athletes have been selected for the Olympics:

Men

Athlete	Event	Heat		Semifinal		Final	
Athlete	Event	Result	Rank	Result	Rank	Result	Rank
Vincent Mumo Kiilu	400 m	46.79	7	Did not advance			
Wilfred Bungei	800 m	1:44.90	1 Q	1:46.23	1 Q	1:44.65 SB	1st place, gold medalist(s)
Boaz Kiplagat Lalang	800 m	1:45.72	2 Q	1:45.87	3	Did not advance	
Alfred Yego	800 m	1:46.04	2 Q	1:44.73	1 Q	1:44.82	3rd place, bronze medalist(s)
Augustine Choge	1500 m	3:35.47	3 Q	3:37.54	4 Q	3:35.50	10
Asbel Kiprop	1500 m	3:41.28	1 Q	3:37.04	1 Q	3:33.11	1st place, gold medalist(s)
Nicholas Kemboi	1500 m	3:41.56	11	Did not advance			
Eliud Kipchoge	5000 m	13:37.50	2 Q	—		13:02.80	2nd place, silver medalist(s)
Thomas Longosiwa	5000 m	13:41.30	4 Q	—		13:31.34	12
Edwin Soi	5000 m	13:46.41	1 Q	—		13:06.22	3rd place, bronze medalist(s)
Micah Kogo	10000 m	—				27:04.11 SB	3rd place, bronze medalist(s)
Moses Ndiema Masai	10000 m	—				27:04.11 SB	4
Martin Mathathi	10000 m	—				27:08.25 PB	7
Ezekiel Kemboi	3000 m steeplechase	8:17.55	4 Q	—		8.16.38	7
Brimin Kipruto	3000 m steeplechase	8:23.53	2 Q	—		8.10.34 SB	1st place, gold medalist(s)
Richard Matelong	3000 m steeplechase	8:19.87	2 Q	—		8.11.01	3rd place, bronze medalist(s)
Luke Kibet	Marathon	—				DNF	
Martin Lel	Marathon	—				2:10:24	5
Samuel Wanjiru	Marathon	—				2:06:32 OR	1st place, gold medalist(s)
David Kimutai	20 km walk	—				1:22:21	19

Women

Athlete	Event	Heat		Semifinal		Final	
Athlete	Event	Result	Rank	Result	Rank	Result	Rank
Elizabeth Muthuka	400 m	DNS		Did not advance			
Pamela Jelimo	800 m	2:03.18	1 Q	1:57.31	2 Q	1:54.87	1st place, gold medalist(s)
Janeth Jepkosgei	800 m	1:59.72	1 Q	1:57.28	1 Q	1:56.07 SB	2nd place, silver medalist(s)
Irene Jelagat	1500 m	4:09.92	9	—		Did not advance	
Viola Kibiwot	1500 m	4:15.62	5	—		Did not advance	
Nancy Lagat	1500 m	4:03.02 SB	1 Q	—		4:00.23 PB	1st place, gold medalist(s)
Vivian Cheruiyot	5000 m	14:57.27	2 Q	—		15:46.32	5
Priscah Jepleting	5000 m	14:58.07	4 Q	—		15:51.78	11
Sylvia Kibet	5000 m	15:10.37	2 Q	—		15:44.96	3rd place, bronze medalist(s)
Peninah Arusei	10000 m	—				31:39.87	18
Linet Masai	10000 m	—				30:26.50	3rd place, bronze medalist(s)
Lucy Wangui	10000 m	—				30:39.96	7
Eunice Jepkorir	3000 m steeplechase	9:21.31	1 Q	—		9:07.41	2nd place, silver medalist(s)
Ruth Bosibori Nyangau	3000 m steeplechase	9:19.75	2 Q	—		9:17.35	6
Martha Komu	Marathon	—				2:27:23	5
Salina Jebet Kosgei	Marathon	—				2:29:28	10
Catherine Ndereba	Marathon	—				2:27:06	2nd place, silver medalist(s)

Key

- Note–Ranks given for track events are within the athlete's heat only
- Q = Qualified for the next round
- q = Qualified for the next round as a fastest loser or, in field events, by position without achieving the qualifying target
- NR = National record
- N/A = Round not applicable for the event
- Bye = Athlete not required to compete in round

== Boxing ==
Kenya qualified five boxers for the Olympic boxing tournament. Bilali was the only boxer to qualify at the first African qualifying event. The other four boxers all earned spots at the second African tournament. In addition, welterweight boxer Nickson Abaka qualified for the Olympics, but missed the event due to injury.

Athlete	Event	Round of 32	Round of 16	Quarterfinals	Semifinals	Final	
Athlete	Event	Opposition Result	Opposition Result	Opposition Result	Opposition Result	Opposition Result	Rank
Suleiman Bilali	Light flyweight	Montero (DOM); L 3–9	Did not advance				
Bernard Ngumba	Flyweight	Doniyorov (UZB); L 1–10	Did not advance				
Nick Okoth	Featherweight	Reyes (MEX); L 2–6	Did not advance				
Aziz Ali	Light heavyweight	Muzaffer (TUR); L 3–8	Did not advance				

== Rowing ==
A sole Kenyan rower has qualified for the Olympics:

Men

Athlete	Event	Heats		Quarterfinals		Semifinals		Final	
Athlete	Event	Time	Rank	Time	Rank	Time	Rank	Time	Rank
Matthew Lidaywa Mwange	Single sculls	8:16.09	6 SE/F	Bye		7:49.17	4 FF	7:52:59	30

== Swimming ==
Kenya sent two swimmers to Beijing.

Men

Athlete	Event	Heat		Semifinal		Final	
Athlete	Event	Time	Rank	Time	Rank	Time	Rank
David Dunford	50 m freestyle	22.29	20	Did not advance			
Jason Dunford	100 m freestyle	49.06	24	Did not advance			
Jason Dunford	100 m butterfly	51.14	4 Q	51.33	5 Q	51.47	5

== Taekwondo ==
Two Kenyan taekwondo jins will compete at the 2008 olympics:

Athlete	Event	Round of 16	Quarterfinals	Semifinals	Repechage	Bronze Medal	Final	
Athlete	Event	Opposition Result	Opposition Result	Opposition Result	Opposition Result	Opposition Result	Opposition Result	Rank
Dickson Wamwiri	Men's −58 kg	Chu M-Y (TPE); L 0–7	Did not advance					
Mildred Alango	Women's −49 kg	Wu Jy (CHN); L 0–7	Did not advance		Zajc (SWE); W 2–2 SUP	Contreras (VEN); L 0–1	Did not advance	5

== See also ==
- Kenya at the 2006 Commonwealth Games
- Kenya at the 2008 Summer Paralympics
- Kenya at the 2010 Commonwealth Games
