= Cuba at the 2008 Summer Olympics =

- IOC code: CUB
- NOC: Cuban Olympic Committee

in Beijing
- Competitors: 149 in 16 sports
- Flag bearers: Mijaín López (opening); Leonel Suárez (closing)
- Medals Ranked 28th: Gold 3 Silver 10 Bronze 17 Total 30

Summer Olympics appearances (overview)
- 1900; 1904; 1908–1920; 1924; 1928; 1932–1936; 1948; 1952; 1956; 1960; 1964; 1968; 1972; 1976; 1980; 1984–1988; 1992; 1996; 2000; 2004; 2008; 2012; 2016; 2020; 2024

Cuba competed in the 2008 Summer Olympics in Beijing, People's Republic of China. As of 8 August 2008, 165 Cuban athletes had qualified to compete in 16 sports. The country's flagbearer at the opening ceremony was wrestler Mijaín López.

== Medalists ==
Medal	Name	Sport	Event
Gold	Mijaín López	Wrestling	Men's Greco-Roman 120 kg
Gold	Dayron Robles	Athletics	Men's 110 m hurdles
Gold	Yipsi Moreno	Athletics	Women's hammer throw
Silver	Yoanka González	Cycling	Women's points race
Silver	Yanet Bermoy	Judo	Women's 48 kg
Silver	Anaysi Hernández	Judo	Women's 70 kg
Silver	Yalennis Castillo	Judo	Women's 78 kg
Silver	Cuba national baseball team: Ariel Pestano; Yoandry Urgellés; Alfredo Despaigne; Luis Rodríguez; Alexei Bell; Yadier Pedroso; Jonder Martínez; Adiel Palma; Luis Miguel Navas; Giorvis Duvergel; Alexander Mayeta; Eriel Sánchez; Rolando Meriño; Héctor Olivera; Michel Enríquez; Yulieski Gourriel; Vicyohandri Odelín; Pedro Luis Lazo; Eduardo Paret; Norberto González; Norge Luis Vera; Frederich Cepeda; Elier Sánchez; Miguel Lahera	Baseball	Men's tournament
Silver	Emilio Correa	Boxing	Middleweight
Silver	Carlos Banteaux	Boxing	Welterweight
Silver	Andry Laffita	Boxing	Flyweight
Silver	Yankiel León	Boxing	Bantamweight
Silver	Misleydis González	Athletics	Shot put
Bronze	Yordanis Arencibia	Judo	Men's 66 kg
Bronze	Eglis Yaima Cruz	Shooting	Women's 50 m rifle 3 positions
Bronze	Óscar Brayson	Judo	Men's +100 kg
Bronze	Idalys Ortiz	Judo	Women's +78 kg
Bronze	Ibrahim Camejo	Athletics	Men's long jump
Bronze	Daynellis Montejo	Taekwondo	Women's 49 kg
Bronze	Yampier Hernández	Boxing	Light flyweight
Bronze	Yordenis Ugás	Boxing	Lightweight
Bronze	Roniel Iglesias	Boxing	Light welterweight
Bronze	Osmai Acosta Duarte	Boxing	Heavyweight
Bronze	Leonel Suárez	Athletics	Men's decathlon
Bronze	Michel Batista	Wrestling	Men's freestyle 96 kg
Bronze	Yordanis Borrero	Weightlifting	Men's 69 kg
Bronze	Jadier Valladares	Weightlifting	Men's 85 kg
Bronze	Yoandry Hernández	Weightlifting	Men's 94 kg
Bronze	Disney Rodríguez	Wrestling	Men's freestyle 120 kg
Bronze	Yargelis Savigne	Athletics	Women's triple jump

== Archery ==
Cuba sent archers to the Olympics for the third time, seeking the nation's first Olympic medal in the sport. Juan Carlos Stevens earned the country its only qualifying spot, in the men's competition, by placing second in the 2008 Pan American championship.

Athlete	Event	Ranking round		Round of 64	Round of 32	Round of 16	Quarterfinals	Semifinals	Final / BM	
Athlete	Event	Score	Seed	Opposition Score	Opposition Score	Opposition Score	Opposition Score	Opposition Score	Opposition Score	Rank
Juan Carlos Stevens	Men's individual	659	28	Hartley (RSA) (37); W 107 (19)–107 (17)	Bodnar (ROU) (60); W 108–101	Wills (GBR) (21); W 108–104	Park K-M (KOR) (4); L 108 (17)–108 (19)	did not advance		

== Athletics ==
Cuba sent 40 representatives in athletics.

Key

- Note–Ranks given for track events are within the athlete's heat only
- Q = Qualified for the next round
- q = Qualified for the next round as a fastest loser or, in field events, by position without achieving the qualifying target
- NR = National record
- N/A = Round not applicable for the event
- Bye = Athlete not required to compete in round

Men
Track & road events

Athlete	Event	Heat		Quarterfinal		Semifinal		Final	
Athlete	Event	Result	Rank	Result	Rank	Result	Rank	Result	Rank
William Collazo	400 m	45.37	3 Q	—		45.06	6	Did not advance	
Andy González	800 m	1:46.59	4	—		Did not advance			
Yeimer López	800 m	1:45.66	1 Q	—		1:46.40	2 Q	1:45.88	6
Dayron Robles	110 m hurdles	13.39	1 Q	13.19	1 Q	13.12	1 Q	12.93	1st place, gold medalist(s)
Henry Vizcaíno	100 m	10.28	4 q	10.33	5	Did not advance			
Omar Cisneros; William Collazo; Yunior Díaz; Yunier Perez	4 × 400 m relay	3:02.24	7	—				Did not advance	

Field events

Athlete	Event	Qualification		Final	
Athlete	Event	Distance	Position	Distance	Position
Lázaro Borges	Pole vault	NM	—	Did not advance	
Anier Boué	Javelin throw	71.85	28	Did not advance	
Ibrahim Camejo	Long jump	8.23	2 Q	8.20	3rd place, bronze medalist(s)
Alexis Copello	Triple jump	17.09	13	Did not advance	
Jorge Fernández	Discus throw	59.60	27	Did not advance	
Héctor Dairo Fuentes	Triple jump	17.14	10 q	16.28	12
Arnie David Giralt	Triple jump	17.30	4 Q	17.52	4
Wilfredo Martínez	Long jump	8.07	6 q	8.19	5
Alexis Paumier	Shot put	NM	—	Did not advance	
Reinaldo Proenza	Shot put	19.20	31	Did not advance	
Carlos Véliz	Shot put	19.58	24	Did not advance	

Combined events – Decathlon

Athlete	Event	100 m	LJ	SP	HJ	400 m	110H	DT	PV	JT	1500 m	Final	Rank
Yordanis García	Result	10.64	7.07	15.82	1.96	49.66	13.90	36.73	4.70	65.60	5:00.49	7992	14
Yordanis García	Points	942	830	840	767	830	987	598	819	822	557	7992	14
Leonel Suárez	Result	10.90	7.33	14.49	2.05	47.91	14.15	44.45	4.70	73.98	4:29.17	8527 NR	3rd place, bronze medalist(s)
Leonel Suárez	Points	883	893	758	850	913	955	756	819	950	750	8527 NR	3rd place, bronze medalist(s)

Women
Track & road events

Athlete	Event	Heat		Quarterfinal		Semifinal		Final	
Athlete	Event	Result	Rank	Result	Rank	Result	Rank	Result	Rank
Yenima Arencibia	100 m hurdles	13.43	6	—		Did not advance			
Virgen Benavides	100 m	11.45	3 Q	11.40	5	Did not advance			
Zulia Calatayud	800 m	2:00.34	1 Q	—		1.58.78	4	Did not advance	
Roxana Díaz	200 m	23.09	3 Q	22.98	4 q	23.12	8	Did not advance	
Indira Terrero	400 m	51.56	4 q	—		51.80	6	Did not advance	
Anay Tejeda	100 m hurdles	12.84	2 Q	—		DNF		Did not advance	
Zulia Calatayud; Susana Clement; Roxana Díaz; Indira Terrero	4 × 400 m relay	3:25.46	2 Q	—				3:23.31 NR	6

Field events

Athlete	Event	Qualification		Final	
Athlete	Event	Distance	Position	Distance	Position
Yarelys Barrios	Discus throw	62.23	4	63.64	DSQ
Yunaika Crawford	Hammer throw	66.16	31	Did not advance	
Yanet Cruz	Javelin throw	58.06	19	Did not advance	
Yumileidi Cumbá	Shot put	17.60	20	Did not advance	
Yania Ferrales	Discus throw	59.87	15	Did not advance	
Mabel Gay	Triple jump	14.09	15	Did not advance	
Misleydis González	Shot put	18.91	7 Q	19.50	2nd place, silver medalist(s)
Yarianna Martínez	Triple jump	13.96	21	Did not advance	
Osleidys Menéndez	Javelin throw	60.51	11 q	63.35	6
Yipsi Moreno	Hammer throw	73.92	1 Q	75.20	1st place, gold medalist(s)
Yargelis Savigne	Long jump	6.49	17	Did not advance	
Yargelis Savigne	Triple jump	14.99	1 Q	15.05	3rd place, bronze medalist(s)
Yarisley Silva	Pole vault	4.15	=27	Did not advance	
Arasay Thondike	Hammer throw	68.74	15	Did not advance	
Mailín Vargas	Shot put	18.47	14 Q	18.28	10

Combined events – Heptathlon

Athlete	Event	100H	HJ	SP	200 m	LJ	JT	800 m	Final	Rank
Gretchen Quintana	Result	13.77	1.68	13.10	24.34	6.02	38.14	2:20.31	5830	25*
Gretchen Quintana	Points	1011	830	734	948	856	632	819	5830	25*

* The athlete who finished in second place, Lyudmila Blonska of Ukraine, tested positive for a banned substance. Both the A and the B tests were positive, therefore Blonska was stripped of her silver medal, and Quintana moved up a position.

== Baseball ==
Cuba earned a qualification spot in baseball by placing in the top two at the 2006 Americas Olympic Qualifying Event.

Athlete(s)	Position
Ariel Pestano; Yoandry Urgellés; Alfredo Despaigne; Luis Rodríguez; Alexei Bell; Yadier Pedroso; Jonder Martínez; Adiel Palma; Luis Miguel Navas; Giorvis Duvergel; Alexander Mayeta; Eriel Sánchez; Rolando Meriño; Héctor Olivera; Michel Enríquez; Yulieski Gourriel; Vicyohandri Odelín; Pedro Luis Lazo; Eduardo Paret; Norberto González; Norge Luis Vera; Frederich Cepeda; Elier Sánchez; Miguel La Hera	Catcher; Outfield - - Outfield; Pitcher; Pitcher; Pitcher; Infield; Outfield; Infield - Catcher; Infield; Infield; Infield; Pitcher; Pitcher; Infield; Pitcher; Pitcher; Outfield - -

Team	G	W	L	RS	RA	WIN%	GB	Tiebreaker
South Korea	7	7	0	41	22	1.000	-	-
Cuba	7	6	1	52	23	.857	1	-
United States	7	5	2	40	22	.714	2	-
Japan	7	4	3	30	14	.571	3	-
Chinese Taipei	7	2	5	29	33	.286	5	1-0
Canada	7	2	5	29	20	.286	5	0-1
Netherlands	7	1	6	9	50	.143	6	1-0
China	7	1	6	14	60	.143	6	0-1

== Boxing ==
Cuba qualified ten boxers for the Olympic boxing tournament. The light heavyweight class was the only one in which Cuba did not qualify a boxer. Nine of the ten Cuban qualifiers did so at the first American qualifying tournament. For the first time since the 1988 Olympic Games, Cuba did not win a gold medal.

Athlete	Event	Round of 32	Round of 16	Quarterfinals	Semifinals	Final	
Athlete	Event	Opposition Result	Opposition Result	Opposition Result	Opposition Result	Opposition Result	Rank
Yampier Hernández	Light flyweight	Dostiev (TJK); W 12–1	Chygayev (UKR); W 21–3	Carvalho (BRA); W 21–6	Serdamba (MGL); L 8–8^{+}	Did not advance	3rd place, bronze medalist(s)
Andry Laffita	Flyweight	Bye	Yafai (GBR); W 9–3	Arroyo (PUR); W 11–2	Balakshin (RUS); W 9–8	Jongjohor (THA); L 2–8	2nd place, silver medalist(s)
Yankiel León	Bantamweight	Bye	Abutalipov (KAZ); W 10–3	Petchkoom (THA); W 10–2	Julie (MRI); W 7–5	Badar-Uugan (MGL); L 5–16	2nd place, silver medalist(s)
Idel Torriente	Featherweight	Dzanie (GHA); W 11–2	Enkhzorig (MGL); W 10–9	Imranov (AZE); L 14–16	did not advance		
Yordenis Ugás	Lightweight	Kramou (ALG); W 21–3	Valentino (ITA); W 10–2	Popescu (ROU); W 11–7	Sow (FRA); L 8-15	Did not advance	3rd place, bronze medalist(s)
Roniel Iglesias	Light welterweight	Smaila (CMR); W 15–1	Moussaid (MAR); W 15–4	Kovalev (RUS); W 5–2	Boonjumnong (THA); L 5–10	Did not advance	3rd place, bronze medalist(s)
Carlos Banteaux	Welterweight	Bye	Saunders (GBR); W 13–6	Abdin (EGY); W 10–2	Hanati (CHN); W 17–4	Sarsekbayev (KAZ); L 9–18	2nd place, silver medalist(s)
Emilio Correa	Middleweight	Fletcher (AUS); W 17–4	Derevyanchenko (UKR); W 18–4	Rasulov (UZB); W 9–7	Kumar (IND); W 8–5	DeGale (GBR); L 14-16	2nd place, silver medalist(s)
Osmay Acosta	Heavyweight	—	Durodola (NGR); W 11–0	Pavlidis (GRE); W 7–4	Chakhkiev (RUS); L 5–10	Did not advance	3rd place, bronze medalist(s)
Robert Alfonso	Super heavyweight	—	Glazkov (UKR); L 3–5	did not advance			

== Canoeing ==
=== Sprint ===
Three Cuban canoers and one kayaker have qualified for the Olympic Games.

Athlete	Event	Heats		Semifinals		Final	
Athlete	Event	Time	Rank	Time	Rank	Time	Rank
Jorge García	Men's K-1 500 m	1:42:80	7 QS	1:49:08	8	did not advance	
Jorge García	Men's K-1 1000 m	3:38:86	7 QS	3:41:22	5	did not advance	
Aldo Pruna	Men's C-1 500 m	1:51.11	5 QS	1:53.81	5	did not advance	
Aldo Pruna	Men's C-1 1000 m	4:02.35	3 QS	4:01.75	3 Q	3:59.09	9
Karel Aguilar; Serguey Torres	Men's C-2 500 m	1:44.15	7 QS	1:43:64	5	did not advance	
Karel Aguilar; Serguey Torres	Men's C-2 1000 m	3:41.17	2 QF	Bye		3:48:88	9

Qualification Legend: QS = Qualify to semi-final; QF = Qualify directly to final

== Cycling ==
=== Road ===
Athlete	Event	Time	Rank
Yumari González Valdivieso	Women's road race	3:51.39	60

=== Track ===
Sprint

Athlete	Event	Qualification		Round 1	Repechage 1	Quarterfinals	Semifinals	Final	
Athlete	Event	Time Speed (km/h)	Rank	Opposition Time Speed (km/h)	Opposition Time Speed (km/h)	Opposition Time Speed (km/h)	Opposition Time Speed (km/h)	Opposition Time Speed (km/h)	Rank
Lisandra Guerra	Women's sprint	11.462; 62.816	9	Kanis (NED); L REL	Tyslinskaya (BLR); Tsukuda (JPN); L	did not advance		9th place final Grankovskaya (RUS); Hijgenaar (NED); Tsukuda (JPN); L	10

Omnium

Athlete	Event	Points	Laps	Rank
Yoanka González	Women's points race	18	0	2nd place, silver medalist(s)

== Diving ==
Men

Athlete	Event	Preliminaries		Semifinals		Final	
Athlete	Event	Points	Rank	Points	Rank	Points	Rank
Jorge Betancourt	3 m springboard	428.25	19	did not advance			
Jorge Luis Pupo	3 m springboard	388.70	27	did not advance			
Jeinkler Aguirre	10 m platform	423.75	16 Q	414.20	15	did not advance	
José Guerra	10 m platform	443.20	11 Q	438.80	11 Q	507.15	5
Erick Fornaris; José Guerra	10 m synchronized platform	—				409.38	7

== Fencing ==
Women

Athlete	Event	Round of 64	Round of 32	Round of 16	Quarterfinal	Semifinal	Final / BM	
Athlete	Event	Opposition Score	Opposition Score	Opposition Score	Opposition Score	Opposition Score	Opposition Score	Rank
Misleydis Compañy	Individual foil	Halls (AUS); W 15–13	Trillini (ITA); L 7–15	did not advance				
Mailyn González	Individual sabre	Toure (SEN); W 15–7	Jacobson (USA); L 11–15	did not advance				

== Judo ==
Men

Athlete	Event	Preliminary	Round of 32	Round of 16	Quarterfinals	Semifinals	Repechage 1	Repechage 2	Repechage 3	Final / BM	
Athlete	Event	Opposition Result	Opposition Result	Opposition Result	Opposition Result	Opposition Result	Opposition Result	Opposition Result	Opposition Result	Opposition Result	Rank
Yosmani Piker	−60 kg	Bye	Davtyan (ARM); L 0010–0100	did not advance							
Yordanis Arencibia	−66 kg	Bye	González (AND); W 1010–0000	El Hady (EGY); W 0001–0000	Takata (USA); W 0010–0000	Uchishiba (JPN); L 0001–0020	Bye			Gadanov (RUS); W 0010–0001	3rd place, bronze medalist(s)
Ronald Girones	−73 kg	—	Toma (MDA); L 0001-0010	did not advance							
Oscar Cardenas	−81 kg	Bye	Rodriguez (FRA); W 0110–0001	Neto (POR); L 0000–1000	did not advance						
Asley González	−90 kg	—	Dafreville (FRA); L 0000–1000	did not advance			Meloni (ITA); L 0001–1001	did not advance			
Oreidis Despaigne	−100 kg	—	Celotti (AUS); W 0010–0000	Jang S (KOR); L 0000–0001	did not advance						
Óscar Brayson	+100 kg	Bye	Hachache (LIB); W 1011–0000	Zegarra (PER); W 1000–0000	Schlitter (BRA); W 1000–0000	Tangriev (UZB); L 0011–1010	Bye			Roudaki (IRI); W 0200–0000	3rd place, bronze medalist(s)

Women

Athlete	Event	Round of 32	Round of 16	Quarterfinals	Semifinals	Repechage 1	Repechage 2	Repechage 3	Final / BM	
Athlete	Event	Opposition Result	Opposition Result	Opposition Result	Opposition Result	Opposition Result	Opposition Result	Opposition Result	Opposition Result	Rank
Yanet Bermoy	−48 kg	Miranda (ECU); W 1010–0000	Bogdanova (RUS); W 0010–0001	Baschin (GER); W 0001–0000	Pak O (PRK); W 1021–0000	Bye			Dumitru (ROU); L 0000–1100	2nd place, silver medalist(s)
Yagnelis Mestre	−52 kg	An K (PRK); L 0000–0201	did not advance			Velázquez (VEN); L 0000–0001	did not advance			
Yurisleydis Lupetey	−57 kg	Baptiste (HAI); W 0111–0000	Jelassi (TUN); L 0000–1000	did not advance						
Driulis González	−63 kg	Bye	Heill (AUT); W 0010–0001	Wang C-F (TPE); W 0010–0000	Tanimoto (JPN); L 0000–1011	Bye			Willeboordse (NED); L 0000–0001	5
Anaysi Hernández	−70 kg	Bye	Alvear (COL); W 1000–0100	Scapin (ITA); W 1000–0000	Böhm (GER); W 1000–0010	Bye			Ueno (JPN); L 0000–1000	2nd place, silver medalist(s)
Yalennis Castillo	−78 kg	Abikeyeva (KAZ); W 1021–0000	Divya (IND); W 1000–0000	Possamaï (FRA); W 0030–0000	Jeong G (KOR); W 0001–0000	Bye			Yang Xl (CHN); L 0000–0000 YUS	2nd place, silver medalist(s)
Idalys Ortiz	+78 kg	Bye	Ramadan (EGY); W 0110–0000	Shepherd (AUS); W 1000–0000	Tong W (CHN); L 0000–0010	Bye			Tserenkhand (MGL); W 1000–0000	3rd place, bronze medalist(s)

== Modern pentathlon ==
Athlete	Event	Shooting (10 m air pistol)			Fencing (épée one touch)			Swimming (200 m freestyle)			Riding (show jumping)			Running (3000 m)			Total points	Final rank
Athlete	Event	Points	Rank	MP Points	Results	Rank	MP points	Time	Rank	MP points	Penalties	Rank	MP points	Time	Rank	MP Points	Total points	Final rank
Yaniel Velázquez	Men's	184	10	1144	18–17	20	832	2:16.38	36	1164	172	13	1028	9:29.55	10	1124	5292	15

== Rowing ==
Men

Athlete	Event	Heats		Repechage		Semifinals		Final	
Athlete	Event	Time	Rank	Time	Rank	Time	Rank	Time	Rank
Eyder Batista; Yunior Perez	Lightweight double sculls	6:19.36	4 R	6:40.15	2 SA/B	6:33.60	3 FA	6:19.96	6
Yuleidys Cascaret; Janier Concepción; Ángel Fournier; Yoennis Hernández	Quadruple sculls	5:44.68	4 R	6:03.56	2 SA/B	6:04.99	6 FB	5:52.66	12

Women

Athlete	Event	Heats		Repechage		Quarterfinals		Semifinals		Final	
Athlete	Event	Time	Rank	Time	Rank	Time	Rank	Time	Rank	Time	Rank
Mayra González	Single sculls	8:07.22	2 QF	—		7:45.75	4 SC/D	8:02.10	1 FC	7:42.68	15
Ismaray Marrero; Yaima Velázquez	Lightweight double sculls	7:13.35	4 R	7:32.14	3 SA/B	—		7:30.15	6 FB	7:20.07	12

Qualification Legend: FA=Final A (medal); FB=Final B (non-medal); FC=Final C (non-medal); FD=Final D (non-medal); FE=Final E (non-medal); FF=Final F (non-medal); SA/B=Semifinals A/B; SC/D=Semifinals C/D; SE/F=Semifinals E/F; QF=Quarterfinals; R=Repechage

== Shooting ==
Men

Athlete	Event	Qualification		Final	
Athlete	Event	Points	Rank	Points	Rank
Eliécer Pérez	10 m air rifle	585	44	did not advance	
Eliécer Pérez	50 m rifle prone	582	52	did not advance	
Eliécer Pérez	50 m rifle 3 positions	1134	47	did not advance	
Leuris Pupo	25 m rapid fire pistol	578	7	did not advance	

Women

Athlete	Event	Qualification		Final	
Athlete	Event	Points	Rank	Points	Rank
Eglis Yaima Cruz	10 m air rifle	396	11	did not advance	
Eglis Yaima Cruz	50 m rifle 3 positions	588	2	687.6	3rd place, bronze medalist(s)

== Swimming ==
Men

Athlete	Event	Heat		Semifinal		Final	
Athlete	Event	Time	Rank	Time	Rank	Time	Rank
Pedro Medel	200 m backstroke	2:01.32	30	did not advance			

Women

Athlete	Event	Heat		Semifinal		Final	
Athlete	Event	Time	Rank	Time	Rank	Time	Rank
Heysi Villarreal	200 m freestyle	2:03.23 NR	41	did not advance			

== Taekwondo ==
Athlete	Event	Round of 16	Quarterfinals	Semifinals	Repechage	Bronze Medal	Final	
Athlete	Event	Opposition Result	Opposition Result	Opposition Result	Opposition Result	Opposition Result	Opposition Result	Rank
Gessler Viera	Men's −68 kg	Tazegül (TUR); L 3–4	did not advance					
Ángel Matos	Men's +80 kg	Basile (ITA); W 3–1	Liu Xb (CHN); W 2–1	Cha D-M (KOR); L 1–2	Bye	Chilmanov (KAZ); L DSQ^{1}	did not advance	
Daynellis Montejo	Women's −49 kg	Puedpong (THA); L 1–0	did not advance		Tran (VIE); W 4–0	Yang S-C (TPE); W 3–2	Did not advance	3rd place, bronze medalist(s)

^{1} Ángel Matos was leading 3–2 in the bronze medal bout against Kazakhstan's Arman Chilmanov, until he apparently suffered a broken toe, and was subsequently ruled to have retired after the allotted one minute of injury time expired. Matos kicked referee Chakir Chelbat in the face, pushed a judge and spat on the floor of the arena before he and his coach, Leudin González, who criticized the referee's ruling as too strict and accused Kazakhstan of bribing officials, were escorted put by security. The World Taekwondo Federation (WTF) banned Matos and González for life, and Matos' results at the Beijing Games were deleted from the records.

== Volleyball ==
=== Beach ===
Athlete	Event	Preliminary round	Standing	Round of 16	Quarterfinals	Semifinals	Final / BM	
Athlete	Event	Opposition Score	Standing	Opposition Score	Opposition Score	Opposition Score	Opposition Score	Rank
Milagros Crespo; Imara Esteves	Women's	Pool E Pohl – Rau (GER); L 0 – 2 (17–21, 19–21); Kadijk – Mooren (NED); W 2 – 0 (21–11, 21–15); Branagh – Youngs (USA); L 1 – 2 (19–21, 21–13, 12–15)	3 Q	Chen X – Zhang X (CHN); L 0 – 2 (19–21, 13–21)	did not advance			
Dalixia Fernández; Larrea Peraza	Women's	Pool B Håkedal – Tørlen (NOR); W 2 – 0 (22–20, 21–19); May-Treanor – Walsh (USA); L 0 – 2 (15–21, 16–21); Kusuhara – Saiki (JPN); W 2 – 0 (21–18, 21–17)	2 Q	Branagh – Youngs (USA); L 0 – 2 (15–21, 13–21)	did not advance			

=== Indoor ===
==== Women's tournament ====
Cuba qualified a team to the women's tournament. The team won all of its five group play games, finishing as group winners. They also won the quarterfinal, bot lost both the semifinal and the bronze medal game, thus obtaining a final ranking of 4th for the tournament.

Roster

The following is the Cuban roster in the women's volleyball tournament of the 2008 Summer Olympics.

Head Coach: Antonio Perdomo

№	Name	Date of birth	Height	Weight	Spike	Block	2008 club
1	Yumilka Ruíz (c)	8 May 1978	1.79 m (5 ft 10 in)	63 kg (139 lb)	326 cm (128 in)	305 cm (120 in)	(Cuba) Camagüey
2	Yanelis Santos	30 March 1986	1.80 m (5 ft 11 in)	69 kg (152 lb)	324 cm (128 in)	304 cm (120 in)	(Cuba) Ciego de Ávila
3	Nancy Carrillo	11 January 1986	1.90 m (6 ft 3 in)	74 kg (163 lb)	320 cm (130 in)	315 cm (124 in)	(Cuba) Ciudad Habana
6	Daimí Ramírez	8 October 1983	1.81 m (5 ft 11 in)	67 kg (148 lb)	305 cm (120 in)	290 cm (110 in)	(Cuba) Camagüey
8	Yaima Ortíz (L)	9 November 1981	1.78 m (5 ft 10 in)	72 kg (159 lb)	326 cm (128 in)	303 cm (119 in)	(Cuba) Ciudad Habana
9	Rachel Sánchez	9 January 1989	1.88 m (6 ft 2 in)	75 kg (165 lb)	315 cm (124 in)	305 cm (120 in)	(Cuba) Pinar del Río
10	Yusleynis Herrera	12 March 1984	1.78 m (5 ft 10 in)	63 kg (139 lb)	325 cm (128 in)	305 cm (120 in)	(Cuba) Ciudad Habana
11	Liana Mesa	26 December 1977	1.83 m (6 ft 0 in)	73 kg (161 lb)	316 cm (124 in)	300 cm (120 in)	(Cuba) Camagüey
12	Rosir Calderón	28 December 1984	1.90 m (6 ft 3 in)	70 kg (150 lb)	330 cm (130 in)	307 cm (121 in)	(Cuba) Ciudad Habana
14	Kenia Carcaces	23 January 1986	1.90 m (6 ft 3 in)	69 kg (152 lb)	310 cm (120 in)	306 cm (120 in)	(Cuba) Holguín
15	Yusidey Silié	11 November 1984	1.84 m (6 ft 0 in)	75 kg (165 lb)	315 cm (124 in)	307 cm (121 in)	(Cuba) Ciudad Habana
18	Zoila Barros	6 August 1976	1.88 m (6 ft 2 in)	72 kg (159 lb)	328 cm (129 in)	307 cm (121 in)	(Cuba) Ciudad Habana

Group play

Pos	Team	Pld	W	L	Pts	SPW	SPL	SPR	SW	SL	SR	Qualification
1	Cuba	5	5	0	10	426	371	1.148	15	3	5.000	Quarterfinals
2	United States	5	4	1	9	459	441	1.041	12	9	1.333	Quarterfinals
3	China	5	3	2	8	467	395	1.182	13	7	1.857	Quarterfinals
4	Japan	5	2	3	7	381	389	0.979	7	11	0.636	Quarterfinals
5	Poland	5	1	4	6	441	445	0.991	9	12	0.750	
6	Venezuela	5	0	5	5	262	395	0.663	1	15	0.067	

9 August 2008; 14:30	Poland	1–3	Cuba	Capital Indoor Stadium; Attendance: 14,000; Referees: Kim Kun-Tae (South Korea), Janpen Jirakakul (Thailand)
9 August 2008; 14:30	(25–21, 17–25, 20–25, 17–25) result statistics			Capital Indoor Stadium; Attendance: 14,000; Referees: Kim Kun-Tae (South Korea), Janpen Jirakakul (Thailand)

11 August 2008; 12:35	United States	0–3	Cuba	Capital Indoor Stadium; Attendance: 12,000; Referees: Umit Sokullu (Turkey), Dejan Jovanovic (Serbia)
11 August 2008; 12:35	(15–25, 24–26, 17–25) result statistics			Capital Indoor Stadium; Attendance: 12,000; Referees: Umit Sokullu (Turkey), Dejan Jovanovic (Serbia)

13 August 2008; 20:00	Cuba	3–2	China	Capital Indoor Stadium; Attendance: 13,000; Referees: Frank Leuthauser (Germany), Massimo Menghini (Italy)
13 August 2008; 20:00	(18–25, 14–25, 25–23, 32–30, 15–13) result statistics			Capital Indoor Stadium; Attendance: 13,000; Referees: Frank Leuthauser (Germany), Massimo Menghini (Italy)

15 August 2008; 22:45	Japan	0–3	Cuba	Capital Indoor Stadium; Attendance: 5,000; Referees: Andrei Zenovich (Russia), Massimo Menghini (Italy)
15 August 2008; 22:45	(17–25, 22–25, 22–25) result statistics			Capital Indoor Stadium; Attendance: 5,000; Referees: Andrei Zenovich (Russia), Massimo Menghini (Italy)

17 August 2008; 12:00	Cuba	3–0	Venezuela	Beijing Institute of Technology Gymnasium; Attendance: 3,500; Referees: Andrei Zenovich (Russia), Konstantin Tufekchiev (Bulgaria)
17 August 2008; 12:00	(25–20, 25–20, 25–19) result statistics			Beijing Institute of Technology Gymnasium; Attendance: 3,500; Referees: Andrei Zenovich (Russia), Konstantin Tufekchiev (Bulgaria)

Quarterfinal

19 August 2008; 10:00	Cuba	3–0	Serbia	Capital Indoor Stadium; Attendance: 12,500; Referees: Ibrahim al-Naama (Qatar), Kim Kun-Tae (South Korea)
19 August 2008; 10:00	(26–24, 25–19, 26–24) result statistics			Capital Indoor Stadium; Attendance: 12,500; Referees: Ibrahim al-Naama (Qatar), Kim Kun-Tae (South Korea)

Semifinal

21 August 2008; 12:35	Cuba	0–3	United States	Capital Indoor Stadium; Attendance: 13,000; Referees: Frans Loderus (Netherlands), Dejan Jovanovic (Serbia)
21 August 2008; 12:35	(20–25, 16–25, 17–25) result statistics			Capital Indoor Stadium; Attendance: 13,000; Referees: Frans Loderus (Netherlands), Dejan Jovanovic (Serbia)

Bronze medal game

23 August 2008; 12:30	Cuba	1–3	China (bronze)	Capital Indoor Stadium; Attendance: 12,500; Referees: Andrei Zenovich (Russia), Konstantin Tufekchiev (Bulgaria)
23 August 2008; 12:30	(16–25, 25–21, 13–25, 20–25) result statistics			Capital Indoor Stadium; Attendance: 12,500; Referees: Andrei Zenovich (Russia), Konstantin Tufekchiev (Bulgaria)

== Weightlifting ==
Men

Athlete	Event	Snatch		Clean & Jerk		Total	Rank
Athlete	Event	Result	Rank	Result	Rank	Total	Rank
Sergio Álvarez	−56 kg	120	8	152	7	272	6
Lázaro Maikel Ruiz	−62 kg	132	8	162	6	294	6
Yordanis Borrero	−69 kg	148	6	180	6	328	3rd place, bronze medalist(s)
Iván Cambar	−77 kg	157	8	196	3	353	6
Jadier Valladares	−85 kg	169	7	203	5	372	3rd place, bronze medalist(s)
Yoandry Hernández	−94 kg	178	6	215	5	393	3rd place, bronze medalist(s)

== Wrestling ==
Key:

- VT - Victory by Fall.
- PP - Decision by Points - the loser with technical points.
- PO - Decision by Points - the loser without technical points.

Men's freestyle

Athlete	Event	Qualification	Round of 16	Quarterfinal	Semifinal	Repechage 1	Repechage 2	Final / BM	
Athlete	Event	Opposition Result	Opposition Result	Opposition Result	Opposition Result	Opposition Result	Opposition Result	Opposition Result	Rank
Maikel Pérez	−55 kg	Gadzhiev (BLR); L 0–3 ^{PO}	did not advance						19
Yandro Quintana	−60 kg	Qin H (CHN); W 3–1 ^{PP}	Batirov (RUS); L 1–3 ^{PP}	did not advance		Huseynov (AZE); L 1–3 ^{PP}	did not advance		8
Geandry Garzón	−66 kg	Bye	Şahin (TUR); L 1–3 ^{PP}	did not advance		Bye	Taghavi (IRI); W 3–1 ^{PP}	Tushishvili (GEO); L 1–3 ^{PP}	5
Iván Fundora	−74 kg	Si Rg (CHN); W 3–1 ^{PP}	Askren (USA); W 3–1 ^{PP}	Saitiev (RUS); L 1–3 ^{PP}	Did not advance	Bye	Cho B-K (KOR); W 3–0 ^{PO}	Terziev (BUL); L 0–5 ^{VT}	5
Reineris Salas	−84 kg	Bye	Hrovat (USA); W 3–1 ^{PP}	Balcı (TUR); L 0–3 ^{PO}	did not advance				10
Michel Batista	−96 kg	Bye	Cormier (USA); W 5–0 ^{VB}	Tigiyev (KAZ); L 0–3 ^{PO}	Did not advance	Bye	Vivénes (VEN); L 1–3 ^{PP}	Gogshelidze (GEO); L 0–5 ^{VT}	3rd place, bronze medalist(s)
Disney Rodríguez	−120 kg	Bye	Chintoan (ROU); W 3–0 ^{PO}	Taymazov (UZB); L 1–3 ^{PP}	Did not advance	Bye	Isayev (AZE); W 5–0 ^{VT}	Musuľbes (SVK); L 1–3 ^{PP}	3rd place, bronze medalist(s)

- Michel Batista originally finished fifth, but in November 2016, he was promoted to bronze due to disqualification of Taimuraz Tigiyev.

Men's Greco-Roman

Athlete	Event	Qualification	Round of 16	Quarterfinal	Semifinal	Repechage 1	Repechage 2	Final / BM	
Athlete	Event	Opposition Result	Opposition Result	Opposition Result	Opposition Result	Opposition Result	Opposition Result	Opposition Result	Rank
Yagnier Hernández	−55 kg	Bye	Cha K-S (PRK); W 3–1 ^{PP}	Bayramov (AZE); L 1–3 ^{PP}	Did not advance	Bye	Mohamed (EGY); W 3–1 ^{PP}	Amoyan (ARM); L 0–3 ^{PO}	5
Roberto Monzón	−60 kg	Bye	Hidalgo (FRA); W 3–1 ^{PP}	Albiev (RUS); L 0–3 ^{PO}	Did not advance	Bye	Sucu (TUR); W 3–1 ^{PP}	Tyumenbayev (KGZ); L 0–3 ^{PO}	5
Alain Milián	−66 kg	Guénot (FRA); L 1–3 ^{PP}	did not advance			Lőrincz (HUN); W 3–1 ^{PP}	Siamionau (BLR); L 1–3 ^{PP}	Did not advance	8
Yunior Estrada	−84 kg	Bátky (SVK); W 3–0 ^{PO}	Abrahamian (SWE); L 1–3 ^{PP}	did not advance					10
Mijaín López	−120 kg	Bye	Artsiukhin (BLR); W 3–1 ^{PP}	Patrikeyev (ARM); W 5–0 ^{VT}	Sjöberg (SWE); W 3–0 ^{PO}	Bye		Baroyev (RUS); W 3–1 ^{PP}	1st place, gold medalist(s)

== See also ==
- Cuba at the 2007 Pan American Games
- Cuba at the 2008 Summer Paralympics
