= Taekwondo at the 2008 Summer Olympics – Women's 49 kg =

Taekwondo competition

Women's 49 kg at the Games of the XXIX Olympiad
- Venue: Beijing Science and Technology University Gymnasium
- Date: 20 August 2008
- Competitors: 16 from 16 nations

Medalists
1st place, gold medalist(s)		Wu Jingyu	China
2nd place, silver medalist(s)		Buttree Puedpong	Thailand
3rd place, bronze medalist(s)		Daynellis Montejo	Cuba
3rd place, bronze medalist(s)		Dalia Contreras	Venezuela

The women's 49 kg competition in taekwondo at the 2008 Summer Olympics in Beijing took place on August 20, 2008 at the Beijing Science and Technology University Gymnasium.

== Competition format ==
The main bracket consisted of a single elimination tournament, culminating in the gold medal match. Two bronze medals were awarded in the taekwondo competition. A repechage was used to determine the bronze medal winners. Every competitor who lost to one of the two finalists, competed in the repechage, another single-elimination competition. Each semifinal loser, faced the last remaining repechage competitor from the opposite half of the bracket in a bronze medal match.

== Schedule ==
All times are China standard time (UTC+8)

Date	Time	Round
Wednesday, 20 August 2008	09:00; 15:00; 17:00; 20:00	Preliminary Round; Quarterfinals; Semifinals; Final

== Qualifying Athletes ==
Athlete	Country
Gladys Mora	Colombia
Yang Shu-Chun	Chinese Taipei
Sara Khoshjamal	Iran
Ghizlane Toudali	Morocco
Mildred Alango	Kenya
Wu Jingyu	China
Hanna Zajc	Sweden
Ivett Gonda	Canada
Sümeyye Gülec	Germany
Dalia Contreras	Venezuela
Manuela Bezzola	Switzerland
Charlotte Craig	United States
Theresa Tona	Papua New Guinea
Tran Thi Ngoc Truc	Vietnam
Buttree Puedpong	Thailand
Daynellis Montejo	Cuba

== Results ==
Legend

- PTG — Won by points gap
- SUP — Won by superiority
- OT — Won on over time (Golden Point)

=== Main bracket ===
Preliminary round
1	Gladys Mora (COL)	−1
16	Yang Shu-Chun (TPE)	0
8	Sara Khoshjamal (IRI)	5
9	Ghizlane Toudali (MAR)	0
5	Mildred Alango (KEN)	0
12	Wu Jingyu (CHN)	7
4	Hanna Zajc (SWE)	2
13	Ivett Gonda (CAN)	0
6	Sümeyye Gülec (GER)	2
11	Dalia Contreras (VEN)	4
3	Manuela Bezzola (SUI)	0
14	Charlotte Craig (USA)	4
7	Theresa Tona (PNG)	0
10	Tran Thi Ngoc Truc (VIE)	5
2	Buttree Puedpong (THA)	1
15	Daynellis Montejo (CUB)	0

Quarterfinals
Yang Shu-Chun (TPE)	2
Sara Khoshjamal (IRI)	0
Wu Jingyu (CHN)	8
Hanna Zajc (SWE)	1
Dalia Contreras (VEN)	3
Charlotte Craig (USA)	2
Tran Thi Ngoc Truc (VIE)	1
Buttree Puedpong (THA)	2

Semifinals
Yang Shu-Chun (TPE)	1
Wu Jingyu (CHN)	4
Dalia Contreras (VEN)	2
Buttree Puedpong (THA)	(SUP); 2

Gold medal match
Wu Jingyu (CHN)	1
Buttree Puedpong (THA)	−1

=== Repechage ===
Round 1
Tran Thi Ngoc Truc (VIE)	0
Daynellis Montejo (CUB)	4
Mildred Alango (KEN)	(SUP); 2
Hanna Zajc (SWE)	2

Bronze medal match
Daynellis Montejo (CUB)	3
Yang Shu-Chun (TPE)	2
Dalia Contreras (VEN)	1
Mildred Alango (KEN)	0
