= Taekwondo at the 2010 Asian Games – Women's 46 kg =

Taekwondo competition

Women's 46 kg at the 2010 Asian Games
- Venue: Guangdong Gymnasium
- Date: 17 November 2010
- Competitors: 15 from 15 nations

Medalists
gold medal	Huang Hsien-yung	Chinese Taipei
silver medal	Dana Haidar	Jordan
bronze medal	Fransisca Valentina	Indonesia
bronze medal	Sara Khoshjamal Fekri	Iran

The women's finweight (−46 kilograms) event at the 2010 Asian Games took place on 17 November 2010 at Guangdong Gymnasium, Guangzhou, China.

A total of fifteen competitors from fifteen countries competed in this event, limited to fighters whose body weight was less than 46 kilograms.

Huang Hsien-yung of Chinese Taipei won the gold medal after beating Dana Haidar Touran of Jordan in gold medal match 6–3.

Like all Asian Games taekwondo events, the competition was a straight single-elimination tournament.

The bronze medal was shared by semifinal losers Fransisca Valentina of Indonesia and Sara Khoshjamal Fekri from Iran.

Athletes from Thailand, Malaysia, Nepal and Philippines shared the fifth place.

== Schedule ==
All times are China Standard Time (UTC+08:00)

Date	Time	Event
Wednesday, 17 November 2010	09:00	1/8 finals
Wednesday, 17 November 2010	14:00	Quarterfinals
Wednesday, 17 November 2010	14:00	Semifinals
Wednesday, 17 November 2010	16:30	Final

== Results ==
1/8 finals
Aizhan Alizhanova (KAZ)	1
Nurul Asfahlina Johari (MAS)	2
Dana Haidar (JOR)	18
Deena Mahboob (BRN)	0
Laila Hussaini (AFG)	0
Pauline Lopez (PHI)	1
Hwang Mi-na (KOR)	2
Huang Hsien-yung (TPE)	7
Tandin Dema (BHU)	1
Buttree Puedpong (THA)	19
Yan Kumari Chaulagain (NEP)	12
Mst Sammi Akhter (BAN)	1
Sara Khoshjamal Fekri (IRI)	6
Justina Lei (MAC)	1

Quarterfinals
Fransisca Valentina (INA)	4
Nurul Asfahlina Johari (MAS)	1
Dana Haidar (JOR)	10
Pauline Lopez (PHI)	6
Huang Hsien-yung (TPE)	3
Buttree Puedpong (THA)	0
Yan Kumari Chaulagain (NEP)	0
Sara Khoshjamal Fekri (IRI)	6

Semifinals
Fransisca Valentina (INA)	1
Dana Haidar (JOR)	2
Huang Hsien-yung (TPE)	8
Sara Khoshjamal Fekri (IRI)	3

Final
Dana Haidar (JOR)	3
Huang Hsien-yung (TPE)	6
