= Huang Hsien-yung =

Taiwanese taekwondo practitioner

Medal record

Women's taekwondo

Representing Chinese Taipei

Asian Games
Gold medal – first place	2010 Guangzhou	Finweight

Huang Hsien-yung (Chinese: 黃顯詠; pinyin: Huáng Xiǎnyǒng; born 12 December 1993 in Taipei County (now New Taipei City), Taiwan) is a female Taiwanese athlete. She won the gold medal in the women's finweight (under 46 kg) at the 2010 Asian Games at the age of 16. Huang surprisingly dominated South Korean champion Hwang Mi-Na 7-2 in the first round, and upset Olympic silver medalist Buttree Puedpong of Thailand 3-0 in the quarterfinals.
