= Athletics at the 2008 Summer Olympics =

Athletics at the Games of the XXIX Olympiad
- Pictogram for athletics at the 2008 Games
- Venue: Beijing National Stadium
- Dates: August 15–24, 2008
- Competitors: 2,057 from 200 nations

Athletics at the 2008 Summer Olympics were held during the last ten days of the games, from August 15 to August 24, 2008, at the Beijing National Stadium. The Olympic sport of athletics is split into four distinct sets of events: track and field events, road running events, and racewalking events.

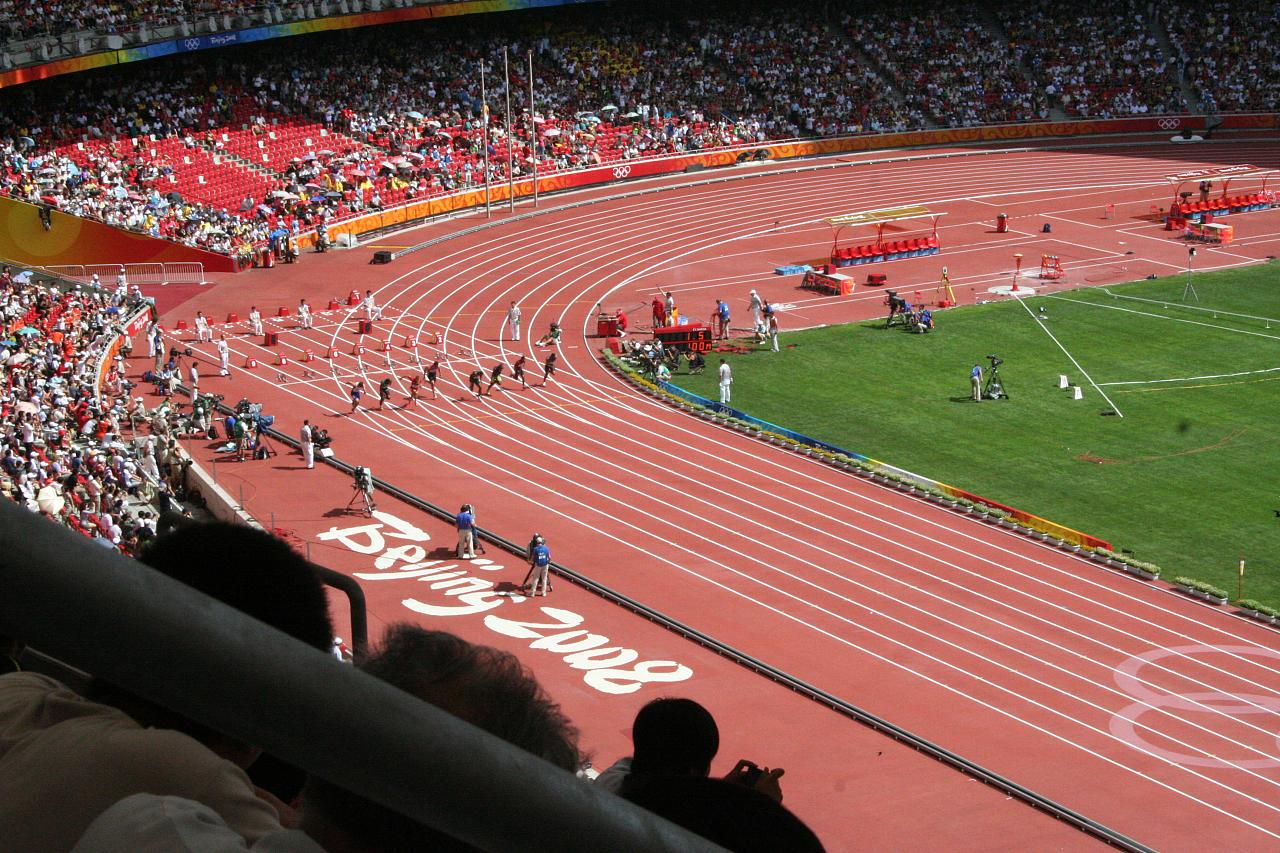
Beijing National Stadium where the athletics for 2008 Summer Olympics was held

Both men and women had very similar schedules of events. Men competed in 24 events and women in 23, as their schedule lacked the 50 km race walk. In addition, both the men's 110 m hurdles and decathlon are reflected in the women's schedule by the 100 m hurdles and heptathlon, respectively.

The Olympic record was broken in 17 returning events. In five events, including the inaugural women's 3000 m steeplechase, the world record was broken.

The athletics was, alongside the Olympic cycling events, one of the few large sports programmes in which the host nation fared comparatively poorly in terms of medals won. Despite a haul of 100 medals at the games as a whole, Chinese athletes took home two bronze medals from the athletics events. The country's foremost athlete Liu Xiang, the 2004 Olympic champion in the 110 metres hurdles, had to withdraw after a false start due to injury.

In the years following the events, results were significantly affected by doping findings; 19 of the 47 events have had amendments to their medal rankings as a result of testing and retesting of samples taken at or before the Games. Multiple medalists have been sanctioned for doping violations. Russia has had the most medals stripped (9).

== Medal summary ==
=== Medal table ===
Retrieved from Beijing Olympics 2008 Official Website.

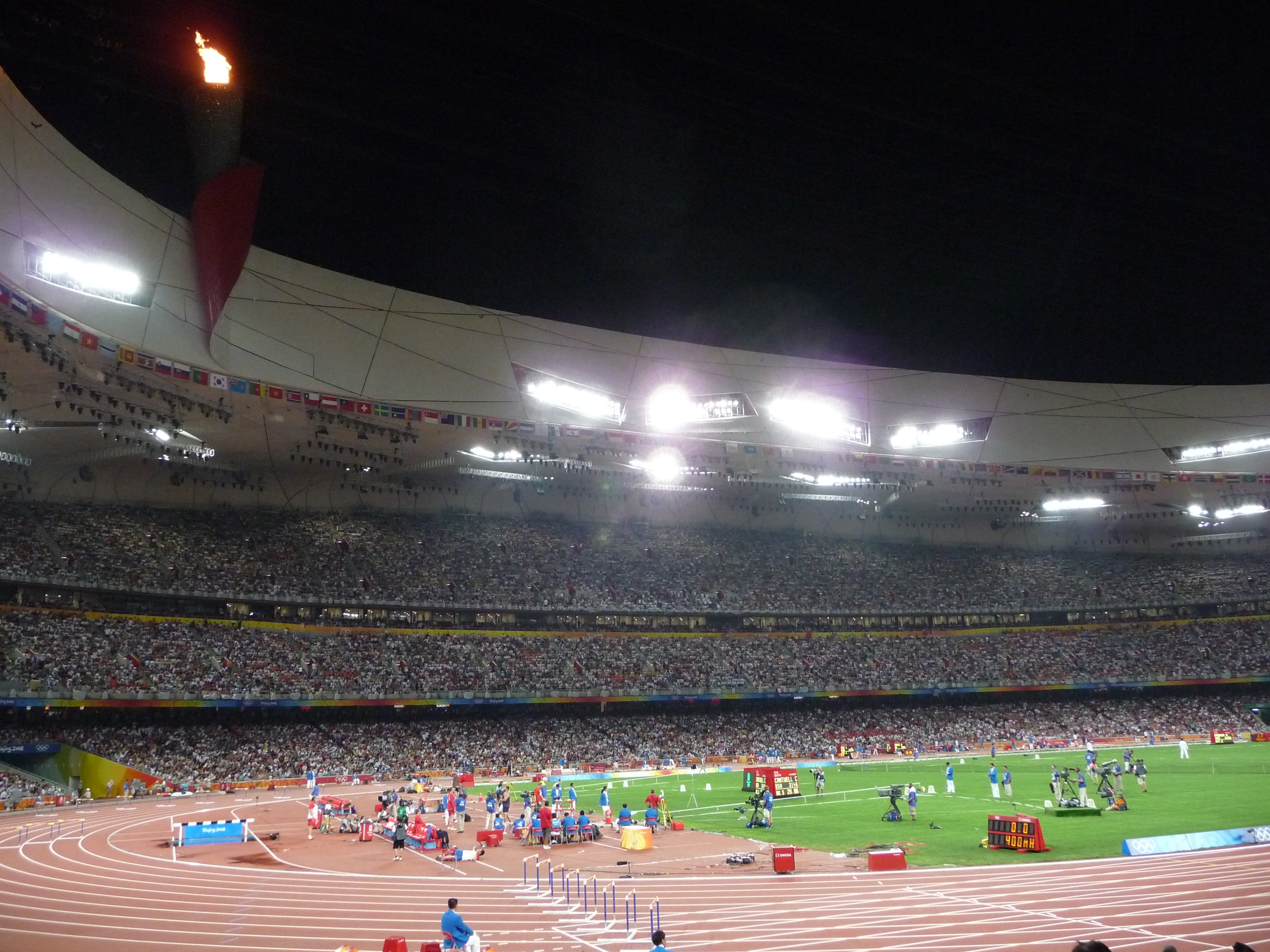
The Beijing National Stadium on August 16, 2008, during the Olympics

* Host nation (China)

Rank	Nation	Gold	Silver	Bronze	Total
1	United States	7	10	8	25
2	Kenya	6	4	6	16
3	Jamaica	5	4	2	11
4	Russia	5	1	4	10
5	Ethiopia	4	2	1	7
6	Cuba	2	1	3	6
7	Belgium	2	0	0	2
8	Great Britain	1	2	5	8
9	Australia	1	2	1	4
9	Ukraine	1	2	1	4
11	New Zealand	1	1	0	2
11	Norway	1	1	0	2
11	Poland	1	1	0	2
11	Trinidad and Tobago	1	1	0	2
15	Brazil	1	0	2	3
16	Italy	1	0	1	2
17	Cameroon	1	0	0	1
17	Czech Republic	1	0	0	1
17	Estonia	1	0	0	1
17	Panama	1	0	0	1
17	Portugal	1	0	0	1
17	Romania	1	0	0	1
17	Slovenia	1	0	0	1
24	Belarus	0	2	1	3
25	Nigeria	0	2	0	2
26	China*	0	1	3	4
27	France	0	1	2	3
28	Bahamas	0	1	1	2
28	Morocco	0	1	1	2
30	Croatia	0	1	0	1
30	Ecuador	0	1	0	1
30	Germany	0	1	0	1
30	Japan	0	1	0	1
30	Kazakhstan	0	1	0	1
30	Latvia	0	1	0	1
30	South Africa	0	1	0	1
30	Sudan	0	1	0	1
38	Canada	0	0	2	2
39	Finland	0	0	1	1
39	Lithuania	0	0	1	1
Totals (40 entries)		47	48	46	141

=== Men ===
Games	Gold		Silver		Bronze	
100 metres	Usain Bolt; Jamaica	9.69 (WR)	Richard Thompson; Trinidad and Tobago	9.89	Walter Dix; United States	9.91
200 metres	Usain Bolt; Jamaica	19.30 (WR)	Shawn Crawford; United States	19.96	Walter Dix; United States	19.98
400 metres	LaShawn Merritt; United States	43.75	Jeremy Wariner; United States	44.74	David Neville; United States	44.80
800 metres	Wilfred Bungei; Kenya	1:44.65	Ismail Ahmed Ismail; Sudan	1:44.70	Alfred Kirwa Yego; Kenya	1:44.82
1500 metres^{[a]}	Asbel Kipruto Kiprop; Kenya	3:33.11	Nicholas Willis; New Zealand	3:34.16	Mehdi Baala; France	3:34.21
5000 metres	Kenenisa Bekele; Ethiopia	12:57.82 (OR)	Eliud Kipchoge; Kenya	13:02.80	Edwin Cheruiyot Soi; Kenya	13:06.22
10,000 metres	Kenenisa Bekele; Ethiopia	27:01.17 (OR)	Sileshi Sihine; Ethiopia	27:02.77	Micah Kogo; Kenya	27:04.11
110 metres hurdles	Dayron Robles; Cuba	12.93	David Payne; United States	13.17	David Oliver; United States	13.18
400 metres hurdles	Angelo Taylor; United States	47.25	Kerron Clement; United States	47.98	Bershawn Jackson; United States	48.06
3000 metres steeplechase	Brimin Kiprop Kipruto; Kenya	8:10.34	Mahiedine Mekhissi-Benabbad; France	8:10.49	Richard Kipkemboi Mateelong; Kenya	8:11.01
4 × 100 metres relay^{[b]}	Trinidad and Tobago; Keston Bledman; Marc Burns; Emmanuel Callender; Richard Thompson; Aaron Armstrong*	38.06	Japan; Naoki Tsukahara; Shingo Suetsugu; Shinji Takahira; Nobuharu Asahara	38.15	Brazil; Vicente Lima; Sandro Viana; Bruno de Barros; José Carlos Moreira	38.24
4 × 400 metres relay^{[c]}	United States; LaShawn Merritt; Angelo Taylor; David Neville; Jeremy Wariner; Kerron Clement*; Reggie Witherspoon*	2:55.39 (OR)	Bahamas; Andretti Bain; Michael Mathieu; Andrae Williams; Chris Brown; Avard Moncur*; Ramon Miller*	2:58.03	Great Britain; Martyn Rooney; Andrew Steele; Robert Tobin; Michael Bingham	2:58.51
Marathon	Samuel Wanjiru; Kenya	2:06:32 (OR)	Jaouad Gharib; Morocco	2:07:16	Tsegay Kebede; Ethiopia	2:10:00
20 kilometres walk	Valeriy Borchin; Russia	1:19:01	Jefferson Pérez; Ecuador	1:19:15	Jared Tallent; Australia	1:19:42
50 kilometres walk	Alex Schwazer; Italy	3:37:09 (OR)	Jared Tallent; Australia	3:39:27	Denis Nizhegorodov; Russia	3:40:14
High jump	Andrey Silnov; Russia	2.36 m	Germaine Mason; Great Britain	2.34 m	Yaroslav Rybakov; Russia	2.34 m
Pole vault^{[d]}	Steven Hooker; Australia	5.96 m (OR)	Evgeny Lukyanenko; Russia	5.85 m	Derek Miles; United States	5.70 m
Long jump	Irving Saladino; Panama	8.34 m	Khotso Mokoena; South Africa	8.24 m	Ibrahim Camejo; Cuba	8.20 m
Triple jump	Nelson Évora; Portugal	17.67 m	Phillips Idowu; Great Britain	17.62 m	Leevan Sands; Bahamas	17.59 m
Shot put^{[e]}	Tomasz Majewski; Poland	21.51 m	Christian Cantwell; United States	21.09 m	Dylan Armstrong; Canada	21.04 m
Discus throw	Gerd Kanter; Estonia	68.82 m	Piotr Małachowski; Poland	67.82 m	Virgilijus Alekna; Lithuania	67.79 m
Hammer throw^{[f]}	Primož Kozmus; Slovenia	82.02 m	Vadim Devyatovskiy; Belarus	81.61 m	Ivan Tsikhan; Belarus	81.51 m
Javelin throw	Andreas Thorkildsen; Norway	90.57 m (OR)	Ainārs Kovals; Latvia	86.64 m	Tero Pitkämäki; Finland	86.16 m
Decathlon	Bryan Clay; United States	8791	Andrei Krauchanka; Belarus	8551	Leonel Suárez; Cuba	8527

* Athletes who participated in the heats only and received medals.

- ^{1500 metres} The original gold medalist, Rashid Ramzi of Bahrain, was stripped of his gold medal for having committed anti-doping violations. The rest of the competitors were elevated by one position accordingly.
- ^{4 × 100 metres relay} Jamaican team originally won gold medals but was disqualified due to anti-doping rules violation by Nesta Carter. The CAS dismissed in 2018 the appeal of Jamaican sprinter.
- ^{4 × 400 metres relay} Russian team originally won bronze medals but was disqualified due to anti-doping rules violation by Denis Alexeev. Following reallocation, Great Britain's Robert Tobin, Andrew Steele, Michael Bingham and Martyn Rooney have been awarded bronze.
- ^{pole vault} The original bronze medalist, Denys Yurchenko of Ukraine, was stripped of his bronze medal for positive test for the prohibited substance. On 17 April 2017, Derek Miles received the bronze medal.
- ^{shot put} The original bronze medalist, Andrei Mikhnevich of Belarus, was stripped of his bronze medal after being given a lifetime ban in 2013 for doping offences. Dylan Armstrong of Canada has received the bronze.
- ^{hammer throw} Vadim Devyatovskiy and Ivan Tsikhan were originally disqualified for doping, but had their medals reinstated in June 2010 after the Court of Arbitration for Sport ruled that there was an error at the Chinese medical lab.

=== Women ===
Event	Gold		Silver		Bronze	
100 metres	Shelly-Ann Fraser; Jamaica	10.78	Sherone Simpson; Jamaica; Kerron Stewart; Jamaica	10.98	Not awarded as there was a tie for silver.	
200 metres	Veronica Campbell-Brown; Jamaica	21.74	Allyson Felix; United States	21.93	Kerron Stewart; Jamaica	22.00
400 metres	Christine Ohuruogu; Great Britain	49.62	Shericka Williams; Jamaica	49.69	Sanya Richards; United States	49.93
800 metres	Pamela Jelimo; Kenya	1:54.87	Janeth Jepkosgei Busienei; Kenya	1:56.07	Hasna Benhassi; Morocco	1:56.73
1500 metres	Nancy Jebet Lagat; Kenya	4:00.23	Iryna Lishchynska; Ukraine	4:01.63	Nataliya Tobias; Ukraine	4:01.78
5000 metres^{[g]}	Tirunesh Dibaba; Ethiopia	15:41.40	Meseret Defar; Ethiopia	15:44.12	Sylvia Kibet; Kenya	15:44.96
10,000 metres^{[h]}	Tirunesh Dibaba; Ethiopia	29:54.66 (OR)	Shalane Flanagan; United States	30:22.22	Linet Chepkwemoi Masai; Kenya	30:26.50
100 metres hurdles	Dawn Harper; United States	12.54	Sally Pearson; Australia	12.64	Priscilla Lopes-Schliep; Canada	12.64
400 metres hurdles	Melaine Walker; Jamaica	52.64 (OR)	Sheena Tosta; United States	53.70	Tasha Danvers; Great Britain	53.84
3000 metres steeplechase^{[i]}	Gulnara Galkina-Samitova; Russia	8:58.81 (WR)	Eunice Jepkorir; Kenya	9:07.41	Tatyana Petrova Arkhipova; Russia	9:12.33
4 × 100 metres relay^{[j]}	Belgium; Olivia Borlée; Hanna Mariën; Élodie Ouédraogo; Kim Gevaert	42.54 (NR)	Nigeria; Franca Idoko; Gloria Kemasuode; Halimat Ismaila; Oludamola Osayomi; Agnes Osazuwa*	43.04	Brazil; Rosemar Coelho Neto; Lucimar de Moura; Thaissa Presti; Rosângela Santos	43.14
4 × 400 metres relay^{[k]}	United States; Mary Wineberg; Allyson Felix; Monique Henderson; Sanya Richards; Natasha Hastings*	3:18.54	Jamaica; Shericka Williams; Shereefa Lloyd; Rosemarie Whyte; Novelene Williams; Bobby-Gaye Wilkins*	3:20.40	Great Britain; Christine Ohuruogu; Kelly Sotherton; Marilyn Okoro; Nicola Sanders	3:22.68
Marathon	Constantina Diṭă-Tomescu; Romania	2:26:44	Catherine Ndereba; Kenya	2:27:06	Zhou Chunxiu; China	2:27:07
20 kilometres walk	Olga Kaniskina; Russia	1:26:31 (OR)	Kjersti Tysse Plätzer; Norway	1:27:07	Elisa Rigaudo; Italy	1:27:12
High jump^{[l]}	Tia Hellebaut; Belgium	2.05 m	Blanka Vlašić; Croatia	2.05 m	Chaunté Howard; United States	1.99 m
Pole vault	Yelena Isinbayeva; Russia	5.05 m (WR)	Jennifer Stuczynski; United States	4.80 m	Svetlana Feofanova; Russia	4.75 m
Long jump^{[m]}	Maurren Maggi; Brazil	7.04 m	Blessing Okagbare; Nigeria	6.91 m	Chelsea Hammond; Jamaica	6.79 m
Triple jump^{[n]}	Françoise Mbango Etone; Cameroon	15.39 m (OR)	Olga Rypakova; Kazakhstan	15.11 m	Yargelis Savigne; Cuba	15.05 m
Shot put^{[o]}	Valerie Vili; New Zealand	20.56 m	Misleydis González; Cuba	19.50 m	Gong Lijiao; China	19.20 m
Discus throw^{[p]}	Stephanie Brown Trafton; United States	64.74 m	Olena Antonova; Ukraine	62.59 m	Song Aimin; China	62.20 m
Hammer throw^{[q]}	Yipsi Moreno; Cuba	75.20 m	Zhang Wenxiu; China	74.32 m	Manuela Montebrun; France	72.54 m
Javelin throw^{[r]}	Barbora Špotáková; Czech Republic	71.42 m	Christina Obergföll; Germany	66.13 m	Goldie Sayers; Great Britain	65.75 m
Heptathlon^{[s]}	Nataliya Dobrynska; Ukraine	6733	Hyleas Fountain; United States	6619	Kelly Sotherton; Great Britain	6517

* Athletes who participated in the heats only and received medals.

- ^{5000 metres} Original silver medalist Elvan Abeylegesse, Turkey, disqualified, and stripped of and ordered to return silver medal following a positive test for a banned substance at the 2007 World Championships in Athletics. Meseret Defar of Ethiopia was advanced to silver, and Sylvia Kibet of Kenya to bronze.
- ^{10,000 metres} Original silver medalist Elvan Abeylegesse, Turkey, disqualified, and stripped of and ordered to return silver medal following a positive test for a banned substance at the 2007 World Championships in Athletics. Shalane Flanagan was awarded the silver medal and Linet Chepkwemoi Masai the bronze.
- ^{3000 metres steeplechase} Original bronze medalist Yekaterina Volkova, Russia, disqualified, and stripped of and ordered to return bronze medal following retesting of her original in-competition sample returned a positive test for the presence of banned substances. Following medals reallocation Tatyana Petrova-Arkhipova of Russia received the bronze medal.
- ^{4 × 100 metres relay} Originally won by Team Russia, but gold medals were stripped due to anti-doping rules violation by Yulia Chermoshanskaya. Following medals reallocation Belgium are awarded gold, Nigeria – silver and Brazil – bronze.
- ^{4 × 400 metres relay} Team Russia originally won silver medals, while Team Belarus originally placed fourth, but both were disqualified due to anti-doping rules violations - by Anastasiya Kapachinskaya and Tatyana Firova in the case of Russia and Sviatlana Usovich for Belarus. Following medals reallocation Jamaica are promoted to silver and Great Britain to bronze.
- ^{high jump} Original bronze medalist Anna Chicherova, Russia, was officially stripped of her bronze medal following a positive retest of her sample from the 2008 Games for the anabolic steroid turinobol. Yelena Slesarenko, Russia, and Vita Palamar, Ukraine, originally 4th and 5th, also were disqualified for doping following retests. Originally the 6th place athlete, Chaunte Howard, United States, has received the bronze medal.
- ^{long jump} Original silver medalist Tatyana Lebedeva, Russia, disqualified, and stripped of and ordered to return silver medal following retesting of her original in-competition sample returned a positive test for the presence of the banned substances. Blessing Okagbare of Nigeria was advanced to silver, Chelsea Hammond of Jamaica to bronze.
- ^{triple jump} Original bronze medalist Hrysopiyi Devetzi, Greece, disqualified, and stripped of and ordered to return bronze medal following retesting of original in-competition samples returned a positive result for banned substances. Original silver medalist Tatyana Lebedeva, Russia was also disqualified later due to use of banned substances. Olga Rypakova of Kazakhstan was advanced to silver, Yargelis Savigne of Cuba to bronze.
- ^{shot put} Original silver medalist Natallia Mikhnevich, Belarus, disqualified, and stripped of and ordered to return silver medal following retesting of her original in-competition sample returned a positive test for the presence of the banned substances methandienone and stanozolol. Original bronze medalist Nadzeya Ostapchuk, Belarus, disqualified, and stripped of and ordered to return bronze medal following retesting of her original in-competition sample returned a positive test. Following medals reallocation Misleydis González of Cuba is promoted to silver and Gong Lijiao of China to bronze.
- ^{discus throw} Retests of samples from the 2008 Summer Olympics detected a positive sample from original silver medalist Yarelys Barrios, Cuba, for performance-enhancing drugs, and she was stripped of her medal on 1 September 2016. After medal reallocation Olena Antonova received silver and Song Aimin received bronze.
- ^{hammer throw} Original gold medalist Aksana Miankova, Belarus, disqualified, and stripped of and ordered to return gold medal following retesting of her original in-competition sample returned a positive test for the presence of the banned substances turinabol and oxandrolone. Following medals reallocation Yipsi Moreno of Cuba is promoted to gold, Zhang Wenxiu of China to silver and Manuela Montebrun of France to bronze.
- ^{javelin throw} Maria Abakumova, Russia, who originally won the silver medal in the women's javelin, disqualified after she tested positive for dehydrochlormethyltestosterone. Christina Obergföll of Germany was advanced to silver, Goldie Sayers of Great Britain to bronze.
- ^{heptathlon} Lyudmila Blonska, Ukraine, who originally won the silver medal in the women's heptathlon, disqualified after she tested positive for methyltestosterone. Following reallocation Hyleas Fountain of the United States awarded silver, Tatyana Chernova of Russia – bronze. Chernova, Russia, who had been awarded the bronze medal following Blonska's disqualification, was herself disqualified after a retest of her 2008 sample was found to also be positive for banned substances, namely turinabol, and the bronze medal was awarded to the 2004 bronze medalist Kelly Sotherton, Great Britain.

== Records broken ==
During the 2008 Summer Olympics, 17 new Olympic records and 5 new world records were set in the athletics events.

=== Men's Olympic and world records ===
Event	Date	Round	Name	Nationality	Result	OR	WR
100 metres	August 16	Final	Usain Bolt	Jamaica	9.69 s	OR	WR
200 metres	August 20	Final	Usain Bolt	Jamaica	19.30 s	OR	WR
5000 metres	August 23	Final	Kenenisa Bekele	Ethiopia	12:57.82	OR	
10,000 metres	August 17	Final	Kenenisa Bekele	Ethiopia	27:01.17	OR	
4 × 400 metres relay	August 23	Final	LaShawn Merritt; Angelo Taylor; David Neville; Jeremy Wariner	United States	2:55.39	OR	
Marathon	August 24	Final	Samuel Kamau Wansiru	Kenya	2:06:32	OR	
50 kilometres walk	August 22	Final	Alex Schwazer	Italy	3:37:09	OR	
Pole vault	August 22	Final	Steven Hooker	Australia	5.96 m	OR	
Javelin throw	August 23	Final	Andreas Thorkildsen	Norway	90.57 m	OR	

=== Women's Olympic and world records ===
Event	Date	Round	Name	Nationality	Result	OR	WR
400 metres hurdles	August 20	Final	Melaine Walker	Jamaica	52.64	OR	
3000 metres steeplechase	August 17	Final	Gulnara Galkina-Samitova	Russia	8:58.81	OR	WR
10,000 metres	August 20	Final	Tirunesh Dibaba	Ethiopia	29:54.66	OR	
20 km walk	August 20	Final	Olga Kaniskina	Russia	1:26:31	OR	
Triple jump	August 17	Final	Françoise Mbango Etone	Cameroon	15.39 m	OR	
Pole vault	August 18	Final	Yelena Isinbayeva	Russia	5.05 m	OR	WR
Hammer throw	August 20	Final	Aksana Miankova	Belarus	76.34 m	OR	

== Participating nations ==
- Afghanistan (2)
- Albania (2)
- Algeria (12)
- American Samoa (1)
- Andorra (2)
- Angola (1)
- Antigua and Barbuda (4)
- Argentina (11)
- Armenia (2)
- Australia (40)
- Austria (3)
- Azerbaijan (2)
- Bahamas (18)
- Bahrain (11)
- Bangladesh (2)
- Barbados (3)
- Belarus (48)
- Belgium (17)
- Belize (3)
- Benin (2)
- Bermuda (2)
- Bolivia (2)
- Bosnia and Herzegovina (2)
- Brazil (41)
- British Virgin Islands (2)
- Bulgaria (15)
- Burkina Faso (2)
- Burundi (2)
- Cambodia (2)
- Cameroon (5)
- Canada (29)
- Cape Verde (1)
- Cayman Islands (2)
- Central African Republic (2)
- Chad (2)
- Chile (6)
- China (66)
- Chinese Taipei (3)
- Colombia (14)
- Comoros (2)
- Republic of the Congo (2)
- Cook Islands (2)
- Costa Rica (3)
- Croatia (10)
- Cuba (43)
- Cyprus (6)
- Czech Republic (30)
- Denmark (3)
- Djibouti (2)
- Democratic Republic of the Congo (2)
- Dominica (2)
- Dominican Republic (6)
- Timor-Leste (1)
- Ecuador (11)
- Egypt (4)
- El Salvador (2)
- Equatorial Guinea (2)
- Eritrea (10)
- Estonia (14)
- Ethiopia (27)
- Fiji (2)
- Finland (19)
- France (48)
- Gabon (2)
- The Gambia (2)
- Georgia (2)
- Germany (53)
- Ghana (3)
- Great Britain (58)
- Greece (32)
- Grenada (8)
- Guam (2)
- Guatemala (4)
- Guinea (2)
- Guinea-Bissau (2)
- Guyana (3)
- Haiti (4)
- Honduras (2)
- Hong Kong (2)
- Hungary (20)
- Iceland (3)
- Indonesia (2)
- India (14)
- Iran (6)
- Iraq (2)
- Ireland (16)
- Israel (4)
- Italy (45)
- Ivory Coast (1)
- Jamaica (45)
- Japan (37)
- Jordan (2)
- Kazakhstan (19)
- Kenya (37)
- Kiribati (1)
- Kuwait (2)
- Kyrgyzstan (5)
- Laos (2)
- Latvia (16)
- Lebanon (2)
- Lesotho (4)
- Liberia (3)
- Libya (2)
- Liechtenstein (1)
- Lithuania (18)
- Macedonia (2)
- Madagascar (2)
- Malaysia (3)
- Malawi (2)
- Maldives (2)
- Mali (2)
- Malta (2)
- Marshall Islands (2)
- Mauritania (2)
- Mauritius (3)
- Mexico (23)
- Federated States of Micronesia (2)
- Moldova (13)
- Monaco (1)
- Mongolia (2)
- Montenegro (2)
- Morocco (26)
- Mozambique (1)
- Myanmar (2)
- Namibia (4)
- Nepal (2)
- Netherlands (14)
- Netherlands Antilles (1)
- New Zealand (10)
- Nicaragua (2)
- Niger (2)
- Nigeria (22)
- North Korea (6)
- Norway (9)
- Oman (2)
- Pakistan (2)
- Palau (2)
- Palestine (2)
- Panama (2)
- Papua New Guinea (2)
- Paraguay (2)
- Peru (3)
- Philippines (2)
- Poland (60)
- Portugal (27)
- Puerto Rico (5)
- Qatar (14)
- Romania (16)
- Russia (104)
- Rwanda (2)
- Saint Kitts and Nevis (4)
- Saint Lucia (3)
- Saint Vincent and the Grenadines (2)
- Samoa (2)
- São Tomé and Príncipe (2)
- San Marino (1)
- Saudi Arabia (8)
- Senegal (2)
- Serbia (10)
- Seychelles (2)
- Sierra Leone (2)
- Singapore (2)
- Slovakia (18)
- Slovenia (17)
- Solomon Islands (2)
- Somalia (2)
- South Africa (23)
- South Korea (17)
- Spain (54)
- Sri Lanka (2)
- Sudan (8)
- Suriname (2)
- Swaziland (2)
- Sweden (12)
- Switzerland (7)
- Syria (2)
- Tajikistan (2)
- Tanzania (7)
- Thailand (11)
- Togo (1)
- Tonga (2)
- Trinidad and Tobago (23)
- Tunisia (4)
- Turkey (15)
- Turkmenistan (2)
- Tuvalu (2)
- Uganda (7)
- Ukraine (66)
- United Arab Emirates (1)
- United States (121)
- Uruguay (3)
- Uzbekistan (12)
- Vanuatu (2)
- Venezuela (4)
- Vietnam (2)
- Virgin Islands (2)
- Yemen (2)
- Zambia (2)
- Zimbabwe (7)

== See also ==
- Athletics at the 2008 Summer Paralympics
