= Mildred Alango =

Kenyan taekwondo practitioner (born 1989)

Personal information
- Full name: Mildred Akinyi Alango
- Nickname: Milka
- Nationality: Kenya
- Born: 10 March 1989 (age 37) Mombasa, Kenya
- Height: 1.57 m (5 ft 2 in)
- Weight: 49 kg (108 lb)

Sport
- Sport: Taekwondo
- Event: 49 kg

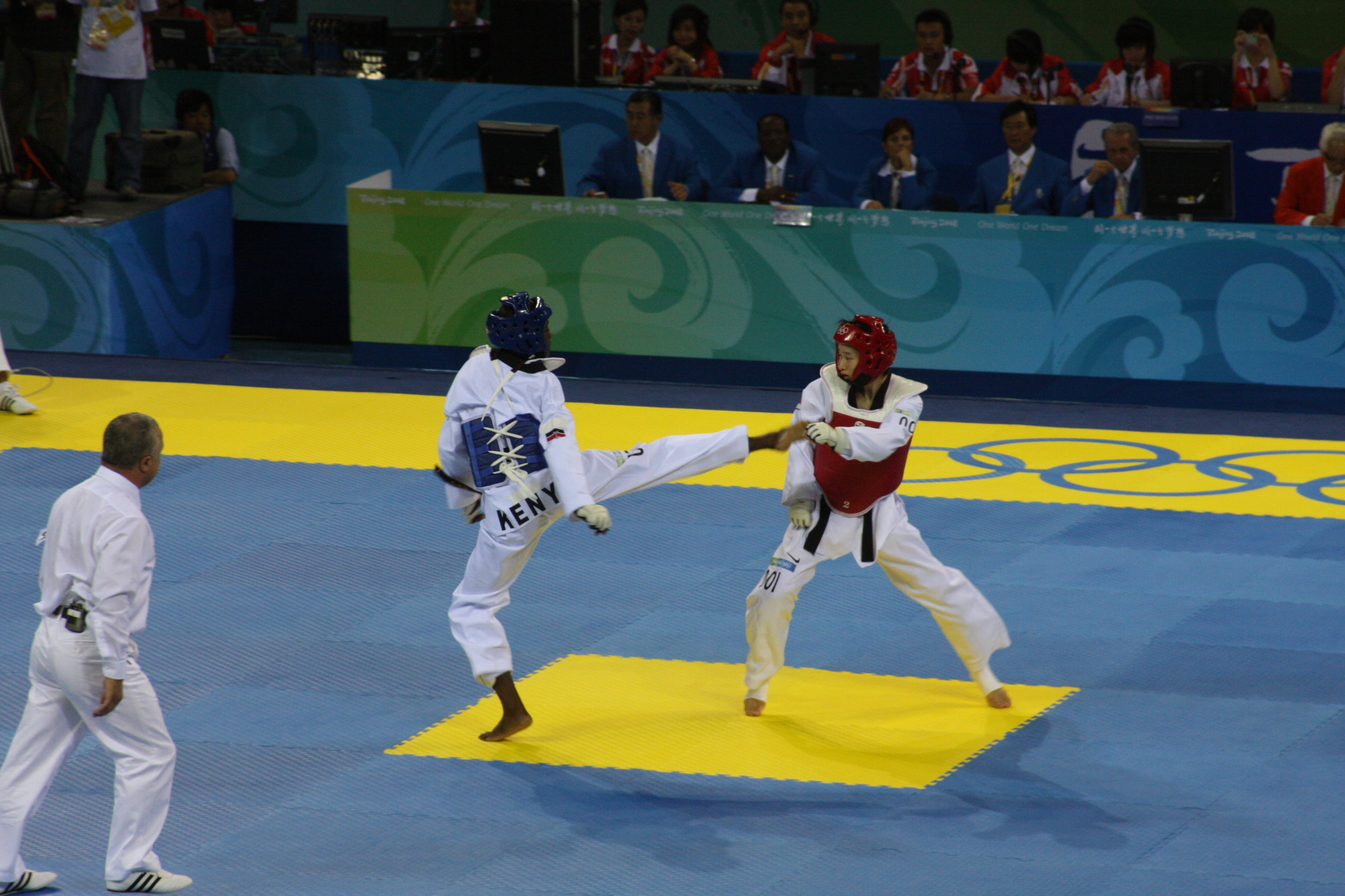
Mildred Alango in the 2008 Summer Olympics

Mildred Akinyi "Milka" Alango (born 10 March 1989 in Mombasa) is a Kenyan taekwondo practitioner. Alango qualified for the women's 49 kg class at the 2008 Summer Olympics in Beijing, after winning the championship title from the African Qualification Tournament in Tripoli, Libya. She lost the preliminary match to China's Wu Jingyu, who was able to score seven points at the end of the game. Because her opponent advanced further into the final match, Alango took advantage of the repechage round by defeating Sweden's Hanna Zajc on the superiority rule, after the pair had tied 2–2. She progressed to the bronze medal match, but narrowly lost the medal to Venezuela's Dalia Contreras, with a sudden death score of 0–1.
