= Fransisca Valentina =

Indonesian taekwondo practitioner

Sport
- Country: Indonesia
- Sport: Taekwondo
Medal record
Women's taekwondo
Representing Indonesia
Asian Games
Bronze medal – third place	2010 Guangzhou	46 kg

Fransisca Valentina is an Indonesian taekwondo practitioner. She won one of the bronze medals in the women's 46 kg event at the 2010 Asian Games held in Guangzhou, China.

In 2011, she competed in the women's flyweight event at the 2011 World Taekwondo Championships held in Gyeongju, South Korea where she was eliminated in her second match by Brigitte Yagüe of Spain. In the same year, she also competed in the women's 49 kg event at the 2011 World Taekwondo Olympic Qualification Tournament in Baku, Azerbaijan without qualifying for the 2012 Summer Olympics. She was eliminated in her first match by Raya Hatahet of Jordan.
