= Ghizlane Toudali =

Moroccan taekwondo practitioner

Personal information
- Nationality: Morocco
- Born: 16 February 1984 (age 42)
- Weight: 49 kg (108 lb)

Sport
- Sport: Taekwondo
- Event: 49 kg

Ghizlane Toudali (Arabic: غزلان تودالي; born February 16, 1984) is a Moroccan taekwondo practitioner. Toudali qualified for the women's 49 kg class at the 2008 Summer Olympics in Beijing, after placing second from the African Qualification Tournament in Tripoli, Libya. She lost the preliminary round of sixteen match to Iran's Sara Khoshjamal, who was able to score five points at the end of the game.
