= Trần Thị Ngọc Trúc =

Vietnamese taekwondo practitioner

Tran Thi Ngoc Truc
Personal information
- Nationality: Vietnam
- Born: 11 February 1989 (age 37) Ho Chi Minh City, Vietnam
- Weight: 49 kg (108 lb)

Sport
- Sport: Taekwondo
- Event: 49 kg

Trần Thị Ngọc Trúc (born February 11, 1989, in Ho Chi Minh City) is a Vietnamese taekwondo practitioner. She won a gold medal for the women's flyweight division at the 2006 World Youth Taekwondo Championships, coincidentally in her home city.

Due to Hoàng Hà Giang was diagnosed with SLE, Ngọc Trúc had replaced to represent Vietnam at the 2008 Summer Olympics in Beijing, where she competed for the women's 49 kg class. She defeated Papua New Guinea's Theresa Tona in the preliminary round of sixteen, before losing out the quarterfinal match to Thailand's Buttree Puedpong, with a sudden death score of 1–2. Because her opponent advanced further into the final match, Ngọc Trúc offered another shot for the bronze medal through the repechage bout, where she was defeated by Cuba's Daynellis Montejo, with a score of 0–4.
