= Charlotte Craig =

American taekwondo practitioner

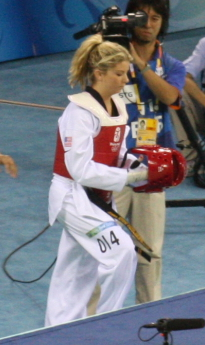
- Craig at the 2008 Summer Olympics

Personal information
- Born: Charlotte Rose Craig; February 2, 1991 (age 35) Riverside, California, U.S.
- Home town: Murrieta, California, U.S.
- Height: 5 ft 6 in (168 cm)
Medal record
Women's taekwondo
Representing United States
World Championships
Bronze medal – third place	2007 Beijing	Finweight

Charlotte Rose Craig (born February 2, 1991, in Riverside, California) was a member of the U.S. 2008 Summer Olympic team competing in Taekwondo in the 49 kg (108 lb) division.

== Biography ==
Craig was born in Riverside, California, to parents Jim Craig and Charlotte Craig Sr. She currently lives in Murrieta, California. When Craig was 2 years old, she had a dysfunctional kidney and had it removed. Her doctors told her parents to have her not participate in hard contact sports. When Craig was 5 years old, her father and mother agreed to sign her up for taekwondo. At first, they had her wear extra padding to protect her only kidney, but soon she started to work without it. Charlotte had trained with Jimmy Kim, a 1988 Olympic Gold Medalist in taekwondo. Charlotte and her mother used to drive 90 minutes from Murrieta to Laguna Niguel four times a week to train with Kim.
