= Sara Khoshjamal Fekri =

Iranian taekwondo practitioner

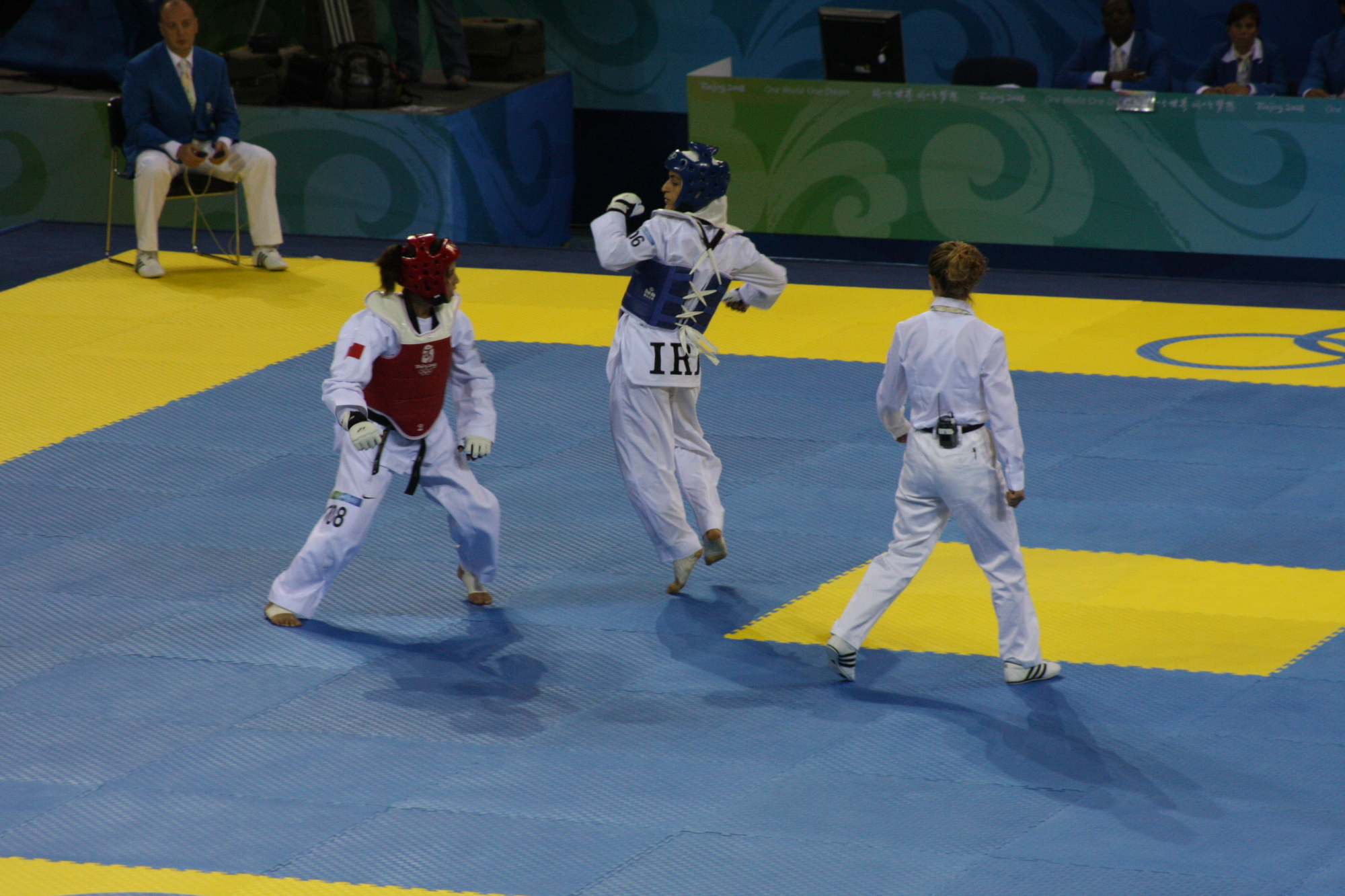
- 2008 Summer Olympics Taekwondo - Sara Khoshjamal Fekri (IRN, blue) v. Ghizlane Toudali. (TUN, red)

Personal information
- Full name: Sara Khoshjamal-Fekri
- Nationality: Iran
- Born: September 21, 1988 (age 38) Roudbar, Iran
- Education: PhD in Sports Biomechanics; Islamic Azad University Central Tehran Branch

Sport
- Country: Iran
- Sport: Taekwondo
- Event: 46 kg
- Coached by: Maryam Azarmehr

Achievements and titles
- Olympic finals: 2008
- National finals: Iran
Medal record
Representing Iran
Women's taekwondo
Asian Games
| Bronze medal – third place | 2010 Guangzhou | 46 kg |

Sara Khoshjamal Fekri (Persian: سارا خوش‌جمال فکری, born 21 September 1988 in Rudbar) is an Iranian taekwondoka and the first Iranian female taekwondo Olympic qualifier. She competed at the 2008 Summer Olympics, defeating Ghizlane Toudali of Morocco in the round of sixteen before losing to Yang Shu-Chun of Chinese Taipei in the quarter-finals.She recently completed a second master's degree in Applied Exercise and Health Science at Canterbury Christ Church University.

== Honors ==
- Bronze medal, German Open (2011)
- Gold medal, Asian University Taekwondo Championships, Kazakhstan (2011)
- Bronze medal, Asian Games, Guangzhou (2010)
- Bronze medal, Asian Taekwondo Qualification Tournament (2007)
- Gold medal, International Taekwondo Tournament (South Korea, 2008)
- Gold Medal, International Taekwondo Tournament (Manchester England, 2010)
- Silver Medal, Islamic countries
- Silver Medal, China Open Games
- Silver Medal, Korean Open Game
- Boronz Medal, Asian Taekwondo Tournament (Lebanon)
- Silver Medal, International Taekwondo Tournament (Netherlands)
- Gold Medal, International Taekwondo Tournament (Fajr, Iran )
