= Daynellis Montejo =

Cuban taekwondo practitioner

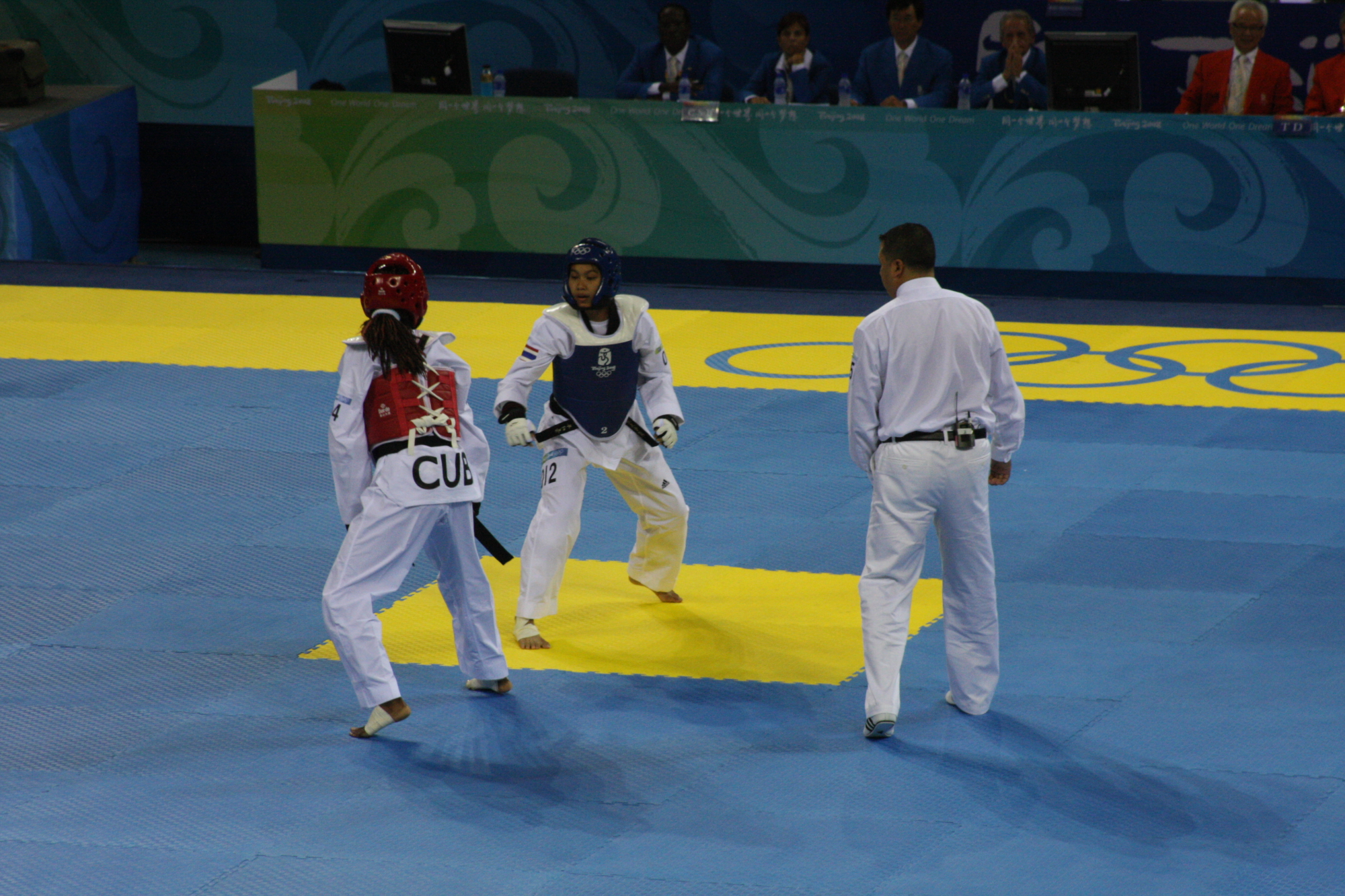
- Daynellis Montejo (CUB, red) v. Buttree Puedpong (THA, blue)

Personal information
- Born: 8 November 1984 (age 41) Santiago de Cuba, Cuba

Sport
- Sport: Taekwondo
Medal record
Representing Cuba
Women's taekwondo
Olympic Games
Bronze medal – third place	2008 Beijing	49 kg
World Championships
Bronze medal – third place	2005 Madrid	Flyweight
Central American and Caribbean Games
Gold medal – first place	2006 Cartagena	Flyweight

Daynellis Montejo (born November 8, 1984) is a female Cuban taekwondo practitioner who competed at the 2008 Summer Olympics in the -49 kg class. She received a bronze medal for her placement in the repechage.

== See also ==
- List of Olympic medalists in taekwondo
