= Hanna Zajc =

Swedish taekwondo practitioner

Medal record

Representing Sweden

Women's Taekwondo

European Championships
Bronze medal – third place	2010 St. Petersburg	Flyweight

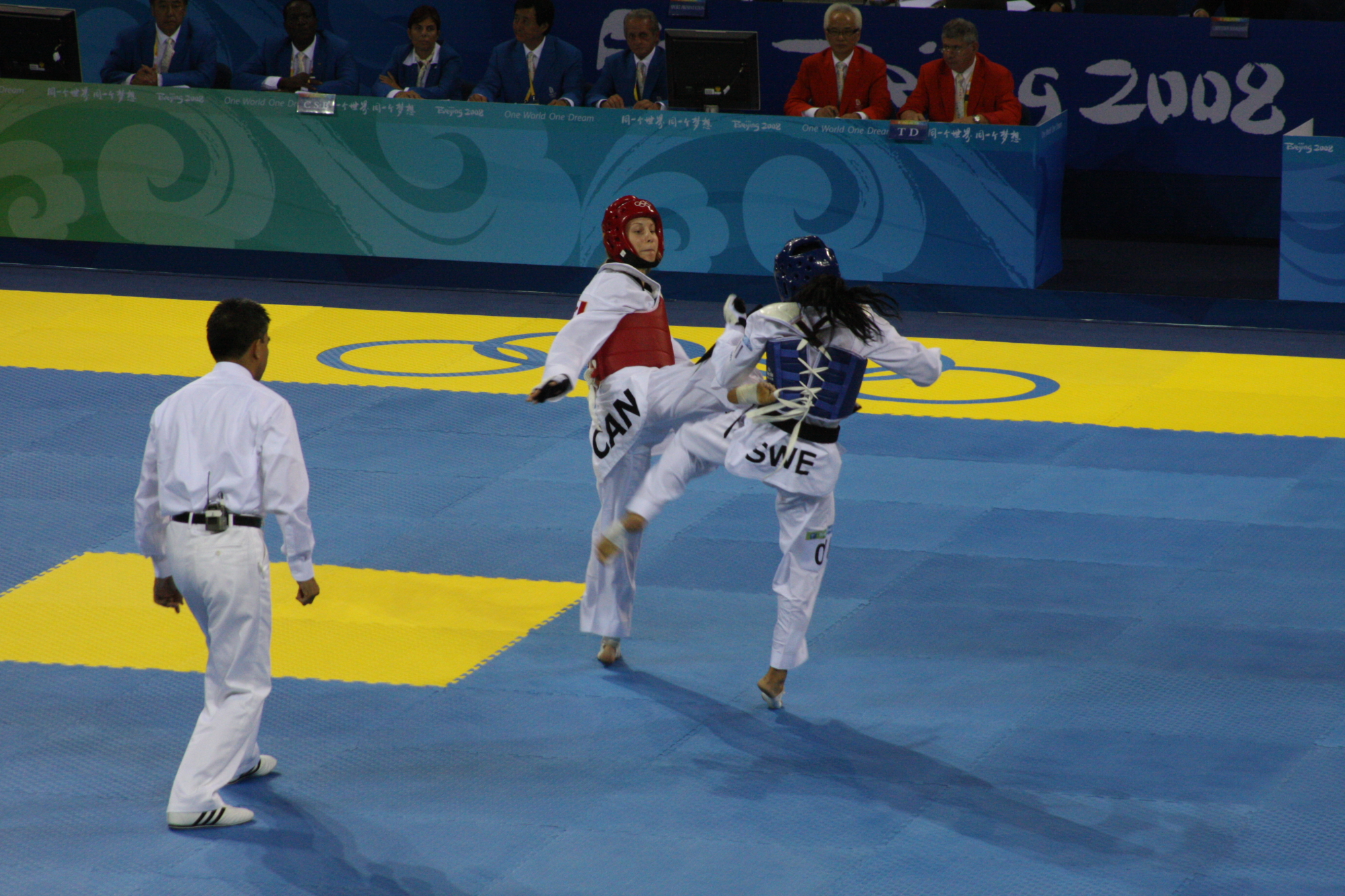
2008 Summer Olympics Taekwondo - Hanna Zajc (SWE, blue) v. Ivett Gonda (CAN, red)

Hanna Rebecka Zajc (born 15 February 1987 in Malmö) is a female Swedish Taekwondo practitioner. She attended at the 2008 Summer Olympics in Beijing and was ranked in 7th place. Zajc lives in Malmö in the south of Sweden and competes for KFUM Poeun.
