= Dalia Contreras =

Venezuelan taekwondo practitioner

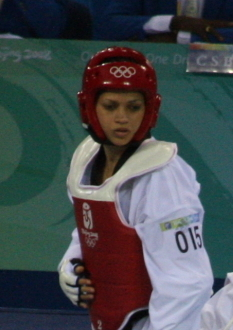
- At the 2008 Summer Olympics

Personal information
- Full name: Dalia María Contreras Rivero
- Born: September 20, 1983 (age 42)
Medal record
Women's taekwondo
Representing Venezuela
Olympic Games
Bronze medal – third place	2008 Beijing	49 kg
World Championships
Bronze medal – third place	2001 Jeju	Finweight (47 kg)
Bronze medal – third place	2003 Garmisch	Finweight (47 kg)
Pan American Games
Silver medal – second place	2003 Santo Domingo	49 kg
Central American and Caribbean Games
Gold medal – first place	2002 San Salvador	Finweight (47 kg)
Gold medal – first place	2006 Cartagena	Finweight (47 kg)
South American Games
Gold medal – first place	2006 Buenos Aires	Finweight (47 kg)

Dalia María Contreras Rivero (born September 20, 1983) is a Venezuelan taekwondo practitioner. She won a bronze medal at the 2008 Summer Olympics in taekwondo. She also competed at the 2004 Summer Olympics, finishing 8th in her weight class.

She won a Silver Medal at the 2003 Pan American Games in Santo Domingo

In the 2002 South American Games in Brazil she finished in the second place in her category (Finweight –47 kg), but the South American Sports Organization (ODESUR) gave only gold medals in that category. Finally, in the 2006 South American Games in Buenos Aires, she won the gold medal. Notwithstanding, that year ODESUR gave the silver and bronze medals

== Olympic results ==
2004

- Finish in 8th.

2008

- Finish in 3rd, bronze Medal

== See also ==
- List of Olympic medalists in taekwondo
