= Buttree Puedpong =

Thai Taekwondo practitioner

Medal record

Women's taekwondo

Representing Thailand

Olympic Games
Silver medal – second place	2008 Beijing	-49 kg

World Championships
Bronze medal – third place	2009 Copenhagen	46 kg

Southeast Asian Games
Gold medal – first place	2007 Nakhon Ratchasima	46 kg
Gold medal – first place	2009 Vientiane	46 kg

World Combat Games
Silver medal – second place	2010 Beijing	49 kg

Asian Martial Arts Games
Silver medal – second place	2009 Bangkok	47 kg

World Junior Championships
Gold medal – first place	2006 Ho Chi Minh City	42 kg

Asian Junior Championships
Gold medal – first place	2007 Amman	44 kg

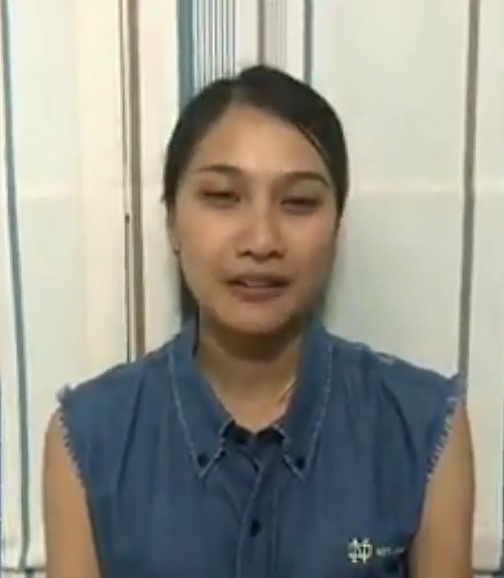
Puedpong in 2021

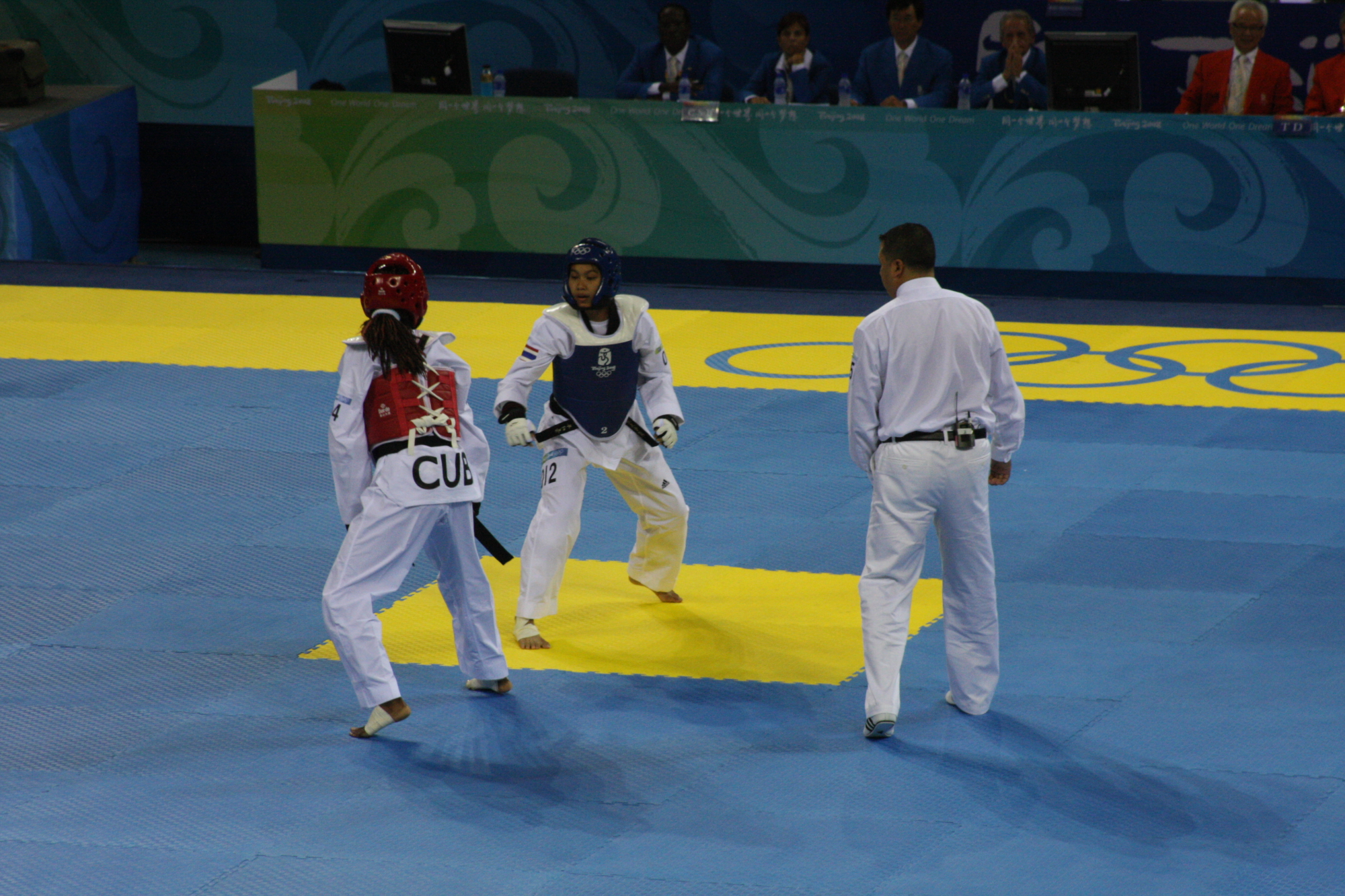
2008 Summer Olympics - Daynellis Montejo (CUB, red) v. Buttree Puedpong (THA, blue)

Buttree Puedpong (Thai: บุตรี เผือดผ่อง; RTGS: Buttri Phueatphong; born October 16, 1990; nicknamed Song which means "two") is a female Thai Taekwondo practitioner who competed at the 2008 Summer Olympics in the -49 kg class, where she received the silver medal. She graduated Bachelor of Social Sciences from Kasetsart.

== See also ==
- List of Olympic medalists in taekwondo
