= Baseball at the 2007 Pan American Games =

- Venue: Cidade do Rock; Rio de Janeiro, Brazil
- Competitors: 8 teams

Medalists
Gold medal	Cuba
Silver medal	United States
Bronze medal	Mexico and Nicaragua

Baseball at the 2007 Pan American Games was contested between teams representing Brazil, Cuba, Dominican Republic, Mexico, Nicaragua, Panama, United States, and Venezuela. The 2007 edition was the 15th Pan American Games, and was hosted by Rio de Janeiro. Baseball games took place at Cidade do Rock, which received temporary facilities for baseball competitions, with a stadium and training fields.

Cuba entered the competition as the nine-time defending champions, having won each gold medal dating back to 1971. They successfully defended their title, with the United States finishing second.

== Tournament ==
The competition had eight teams divided in two groups. In each group, each team played against all others once and the two best advanced to the semifinals. The best team from Group A will play the second team from Group B and vice versa. Ties within a group were broken by the team allowing the lowest number of runs to pass to the knockout round. The competition began on 14 July, with the finals on 19 July (rescheduled to 20 July due to rain).

== Preliminary round ==
=== Group A ===
Pos	Team	Pld	W	L	RF	RA	RD	PCT	GB	Qualification
1	United States	3	3	0	20	10	+10	1.000	—	Advance to Knockout round
2	Nicaragua	3	1	2	6	9	−3	.333	2	Advance to Knockout round
3	Dominican Republic	3	1	2	15	9	+6	.333	2	
4	Brazil (H)	3	1	2	8	21	−13	.333	2	

Source: Brazilian Olympic Committee
(H) Hosts

==== Results ====
15 July 2007; 9:00 (UTC–3)	Nicaragua	0–1	Brazil	Cidade do Rock Field 1 Attendance: 223

15 July 2007; 12:10 (UTC–3)	United States	5–1	Dominican Republic	Cidade do Rock Field 2 Attendance: 120

16 July 2007; 9:00 (UTC–3)	Dominican Republic	14–2 (F/8)	Brazil	Cidade do Rock Field 1 Attendance: 320

16 July 2007; 12:45 (UTC–3)	United States	8–4	Nicaragua	Cidade do Rock Field 1 Attendance: 0

18 July 2007; 9:00 (UTC–3)	Dominican Republic	0–2	Nicaragua	Cidade do Rock Field 2 Attendance: 0

18 July 2007; 10:15 (UTC–3)	Brazil	5–7	United States	Cidade do Rock Field 1 Attendance: 69

=== Group B ===
Pos	Team	Pld	W	L	RF	RA	RD	PCT	GB	Qualification
1	Cuba	3	2	1	15	8	+7	.667	—	Advance to Knockout round
2	Mexico	3	2	1	13	10	+3	.667	—	Advance to Knockout round
3	Panama	3	2	1	8	14	−6	.667	—	
4	Venezuela	3	0	3	7	11	−4	.000	2	

Source: Brazilian Olympic Committee

==== Results ====
14 July 2007; 10:00 (UTC–3)	Cuba	3–4	Panama	Cidade do Rock Field 1 Attendance: 120

15 July 2007; 9:00 (UTC–3)	Panama	4–2	Venezuela	Cidade do Rock Field 2 Attendance: 100

15 July 2007; 12:00 (UTC–3)	Cuba	8–1	Mexico	Cidade do Rock Field 1 Attendance: 350

16 July 2007; 9:00 (UTC–3)	Mexico	9–0	Panama	Cidade do Rock Field 2 Attendance: 128

16 July 2007; 12:30 (UTC–3)	Venezuela	3–4	Cuba	Cidade do Rock Field 2 Attendance: 0

18 July 2007; 9:15 (UTC–3)	Mexico	3–2	Venezuela	Cidade do Rock Field 1 Attendance: 230

== Knockout round ==
Semi-finals
18 July
Nicaragua	0
Cuba	4
18 July
Mexico	1
United States	2

Final
20 July
Cuba	3
United States	1
Third place
20 July
Nicaragua	RO
Mexico	RO

=== Semi-finals ===
18 July 2007; 14:15 (UTC–3)	Mexico	1–2	United States	Cidade do Rock Field 1 Attendance: 0

18 July 2007; 14:15 (UTC–3)	Nicaragua	0–4	Cuba	Cidade do Rock Field 2 Attendance: 45

=== Final ===
20 July 2007; 9:00 (UTC–3)	Cuba	3–1	United States	Cidade do Rock Field 1 Attendance: 224

== Medal chart ==
(gold) Cuba
(silver) United States of America
(bronze) Mexico and Nicaragua (awarded to both since the event was cancelled due to rain).

=== Medalists ===
Gold	Silver	Bronze	
Cuba: Frederich Cepeda; Yoenis Céspedes; Aroldis Chapman; Giorvis Duvergel; Norberto González; Yuli Gurriel; Pedro Luis Lazo; Jonder Martínez; Yunesky Maya; Alexander Mayeta; Luis Miguel Navas; Adiel Palma; Eduardo Paret; Ariel Pestano; Alexei Ramírez; Elier Sánchez; Eriel Sánchez; Yoandry Urgellés; Osmani Urrutia; Norge Luis Vera; Manager: Rey Vicente Anglada	United States: Pedro Álvarez; Ryan Berry; Jordan Danks; Danny Espinosa; Ryan Flaherty; Logan Forsythe; Brett Hunter; Joe Kelly; Roger Kieschnick; Lance Lynn; Brian Matusz; Tommy Medica; Jordy Mercer; Petey Paramore; Josh Romanski; Tyson Ross; Cody Satterwhite; Justin Smoak; Jake Thompson; Brett Wallace; Manager: Mike Weathers	Mexico: Jorge Campillo; Francisco Campos; Rafael Díaz; Efrén Espinoza; Karim García; Luis García; Benji Gil; Gerónimo Gil; José Silva; Noé Muñoz; Pablo Ortega; Roberto Ramírez; Óscar Rivera; José Luis Sandoval; Luis Mauricio Suárez; Mauricio Tequida; Iván Terrazas; Mario Valdez; Manager: Vinicio Castilla	Nicaragua: Jorge Avellán; Norman Cardoze; Larry Galeano; Yasmir García; Sandor Guido; Armando Hernández; Hesse Loaisiga; Edgard López; Oswaldo Mairena; Sergio Mena; José Pérez; Jairo Pineda; Luz Portobanco; Julio Raudes; Pedro Rayo; Justo Rivas; Henry Roa; Jose Sáenz; Danilo Sotelo; Eddy Talavera; Manager: Omar Cisneros

== Statistics leaders ==
=== Batting ===
Stat	Player	Total/Avg
Batting average	(United States) Logan Forsythe	.625
Hits	(United States) Logan Forsythe	10
Runs	(United States) Jordan Danks	7
Home runs	(Cuba) Alexander Mayeta	2
RBI	(United States) Pedro Álvarez	8
Stolen bases	7 tied with (Note: Giorvis Duvergel, Danny Espinosa, Paulo Orlando, Anderson Gomes, Iván Terrazas, Osmani Urrutia, Logan Forsythe)	2
Slugging percentage	(Nicaragua) Justo Rivas	.923

=== Pitching ===
Statistic	Name	Total/Avg
Wins	(Cuba) Adiel Palma	2
Losses	15 tied with	1
Innings pitched	(Cuba) Adiel Palma	13.2
ERA	9 tied with (Note: Jorge Campillo, Armando Hernández, Pedro Luis Lazo, Martín Vargas, Oscar Martínez, Alexi Ogando, Jesús Yepez, Kléber Ojima, Argimiro Guanchez, Len Picota)	0.00
Strikeouts	(Cuba) Adiel Palma	19
