= Oscar Rivera =

Oscar Rivera may refer to:

- Oscar López Rivera (born 1943), Puerto Rican activist and militant
- Oscar García Rivera (1900–1969), Puerto Rican politician, lawyer and activist
- Óscar Rivera (baseball) (born 1981), Mexican professional baseball pitcher
