= Yoandry Urgellés =

Cuban baseball player (born 1981)

Personal information
- Born: July 28, 1981 (age 44) Santiago de Cuba, Cuba
Medal record
Men's baseball
Representing Cuba
Olympic Games
Gold medal – first place	2004 Athens	Team
Silver medal – second place	2008 Beijing	Team
Baseball World Cup
Gold medal – first place	2005 Rotterdam	Team
Silver medal – second place	2007 Taipei	Team
Intercontinental Cup
Gold medal – first place	2006 Taichung	Team
Gold medal – first place	2010 Taichung	Team
Pan American Games
Gold medal – first place	2007 Rio de Janeiro	Team

Yoandry Urgellés Cobas (born July 28, 1981 in Santiago de Cuba) is a left fielder for Industriales of the Cuban National Series. He was part of the Cuban team that won the gold medal at the 2004 Summer Olympics in Athens.

== Career ==
During the 2005-06 Cuban National Series, Urgelles hit .362, with 66 RBIs — second on the team to league MVP Alexander Mayeta. Urgelles did lead the team in bases on balls, with 62.
