= Tyson Ross =

American baseball player (born 1987)

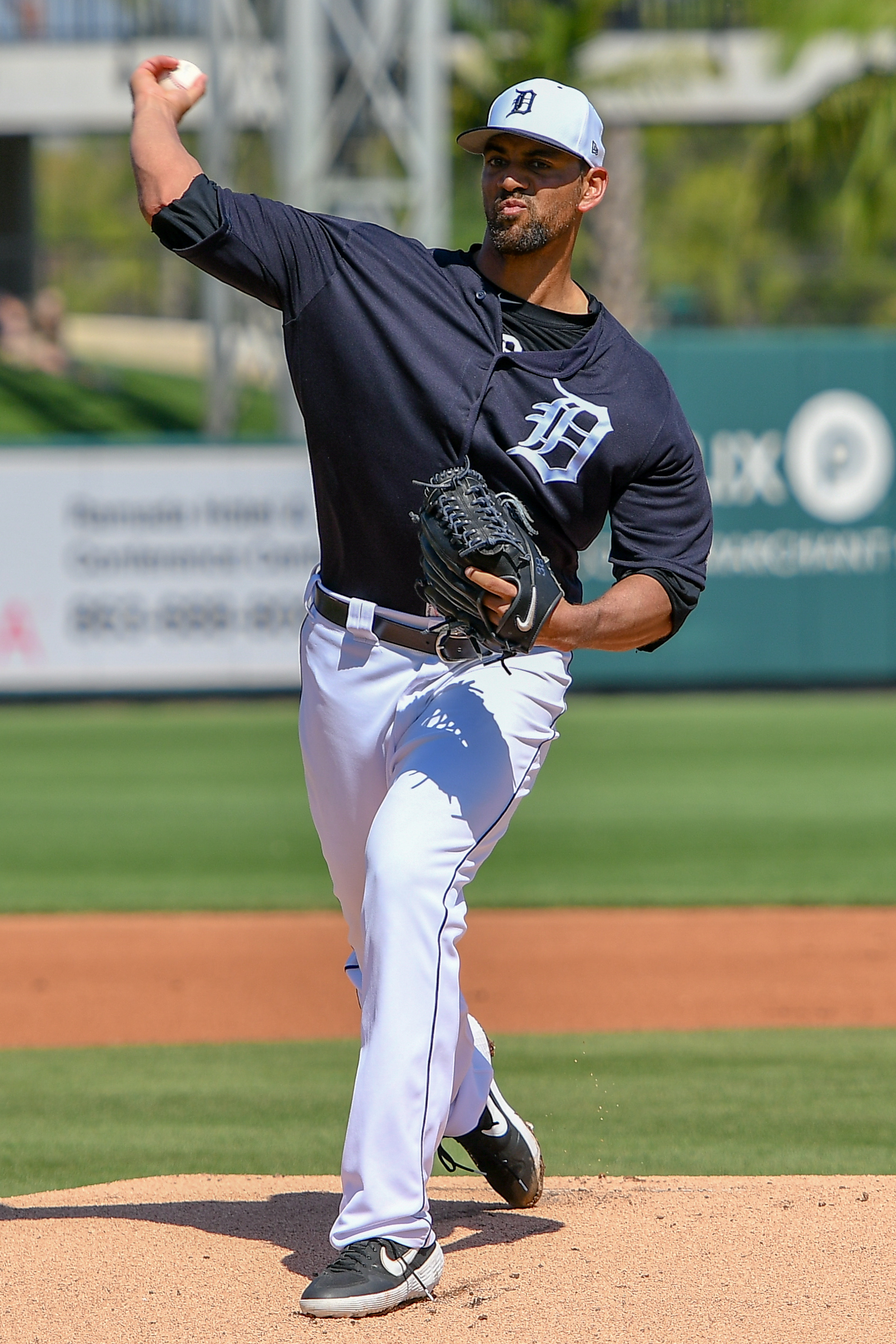
- Ross with the Detroit Tigers in 2019
- Pitcher
- Born: April 22, 1987 (age 39); Berkeley, California, U.S.
- Batted: Right Threw: Right

MLB debut
- April 7, 2010, for the Oakland Athletics

Last MLB appearance
- May 10, 2019, for the Detroit Tigers

MLB statistics
- Win–loss record: 44–70
- Earned run average: 4.04
- Strikeouts: 816
- Stats at Baseball Reference

Teams
- Oakland Athletics (2010–2012); San Diego Padres (2013–2016); Texas Rangers (2017); San Diego Padres (2018); St. Louis Cardinals (2018); Detroit Tigers (2019)

Career highlights and awards
- All-Star (2014)
Medals
Men's baseball
Representing United States
Pan American Games
| Silver medal – second place | 2007 Rio de Janeiro | Team |

Tyson William Ross (born April 22, 1987) is an American former professional baseball pitcher. He played in Major League Baseball (MLB) for the Oakland Athletics, San Diego Padres, Texas Rangers, St. Louis Cardinals, and Detroit Tigers. Ross was drafted by the Athletics in the 2nd round of the 2008 MLB draft. He made his MLB debut in 2010 and was an MLB All-Star in 2014.

== Early life ==
Tyson William Ross was born on April 22, 1987, in Berkeley, California. A Berkeley native, he was raised in Oakland, California. He attended Bishop O'Dowd High School in Oakland. In his junior year in 2004 he batted .366 with seven home runs, and was 9-2 with a 1.53 ERA. He was the 2005 North Coast Section CIF Player of the Year, after going 12–1 with an 0.71 ERA and 130 strikeouts as a senior.

== College career ==
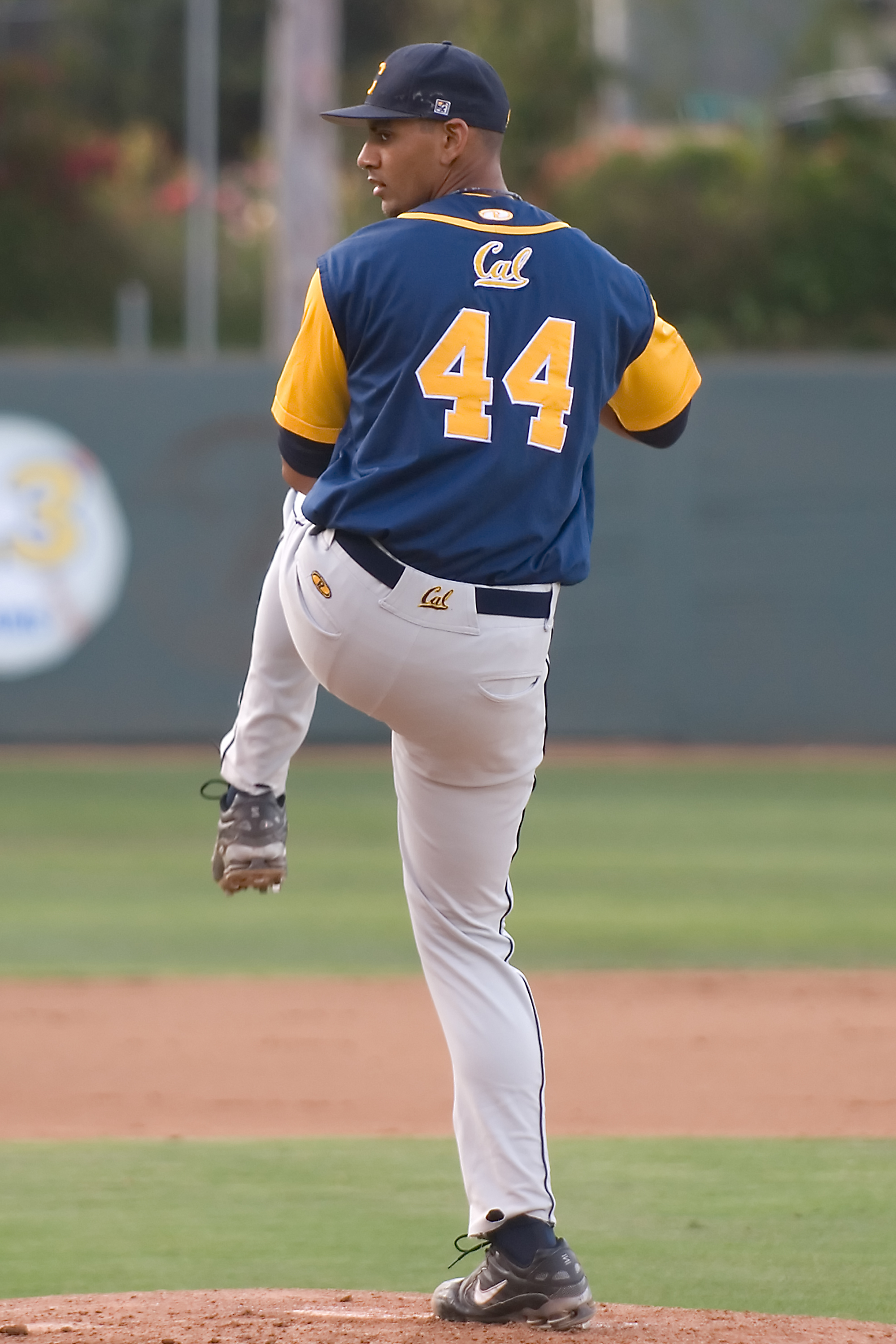
Ross pitching for Cal in 2007

He attended the University of California, Berkeley, where he majored in American Studies and played college baseball for the California Golden Bears baseball team. He won the college 2007 Rawlings Gold Glove award as the country's best fielding pitcher. He was an All Pac-10 Conference selection in 2007 and 2008. For his career, Ross had 271 strikeouts (third on Cal’s career list) in 278.2 innings, with 19 wins and a 3.20 career ERA.

== Professional career ==
=== Draft and minor leagues ===
Ross was drafted by the Oakland Athletics in the 2nd round of the 2008 MLB draft. He signed for a $694,000 signing bonus.

Ross made 6 appearances (4 starts, 0-1) in 2008 for the Single-A Kane County Cougars of the Midwest League, posting a 4.66 ERA. He went 19.1 innings, giving up 11 runs (10 earned) on 16 hits while striking out 16 and walking 5.

In 2009, he began the season with the Single-A Stockton Ports of the California League, starting 18 games, posting a 5-6 record with a 4.17 ERA. He pitched 86.1 innings, allowing 49 runs (40 earned) on 78 hits with 82 strikeouts and 33 walks. He finished the season with the Double-A Midland RockHounds of the Texas League, making 9 starts, going 5-4 with a 3.96 ERA. In 50 innings, he allowed 22 runs (all earned) on 40 hits, fanning 31 and walking 20.

=== Oakland Athletics (2010–2012) ===
Coming into the 2010 season, Ross was ranked as Oakland's 6th-best prospect. Despite not having pitched above Double-A, Ross made MLB roster while making only 5 spring training appearances. Ross made his MLB debut on April 7, 2010, against the Seattle Mariners. He went 2.1 innings, allowing no runs on one hit. He struck out the first batter he faced, his childhood idol Ken Griffey Jr., and walked one. In his next appearance, on April 11, he pitched 3 innings against the Angels and recorded his first career MLB save. On May 11 against the Texas Rangers, he picked up both his first MLB career win and first MLB blown save. Ross worked out of the bullpen until July 6, when he was sent down to Triple-A to be groomed back to a starter role. Ross had a 5.49 ERA in 39 1/3 innings with the A's, and posted a 3.55 ERA in six starts for the Triple-A Sacramento River Cats of the Pacific Coast League with 30 strikeouts in 25.1 innings.

Ross was one of the A's final cuts in spring training 2011, but was recalled to join the bullpen in early April. He took the place of the injured Dallas Braden in the rotation, making six starts until he himself was injured and placed on the DL with a strained oblique. Ross had a 2.75 ERA in 36 innings at the time of the injury. He did not return to the Oakland A's that season, finishing out 2011 in Triple-A, where he had a 7.61 ERA in 9 starts.

Ross was pegged as the A's fifth starter out of spring training in 2012, but was sent down to the Sacramento River Cats at the start of the season because Oakland would not need a fifth starter until mid-April. He made his first start for the A's on April 17, and continued to start until he was optioned back to Sacramento on May 31 with a 6.51 ERA. He then shuttled between Triple-A and the A's, starting until the September roster expansion, when he rejoined the parent club as a reliever. In his five stints with Oakland, Ross was 2-9 in his 13 starts and had a 6.50 ERA overall. He had a 2.99 ERA in his 15 games (13 starts) with the River Cats.

During his tenure with the Oakland Athletics, Ross wore number 66 for the name of the street where he first played baseball, 66th Avenue, located on the northwestern boundary of the Oakland–Alameda County Coliseum.

=== San Diego Padres (2013–2016) ===
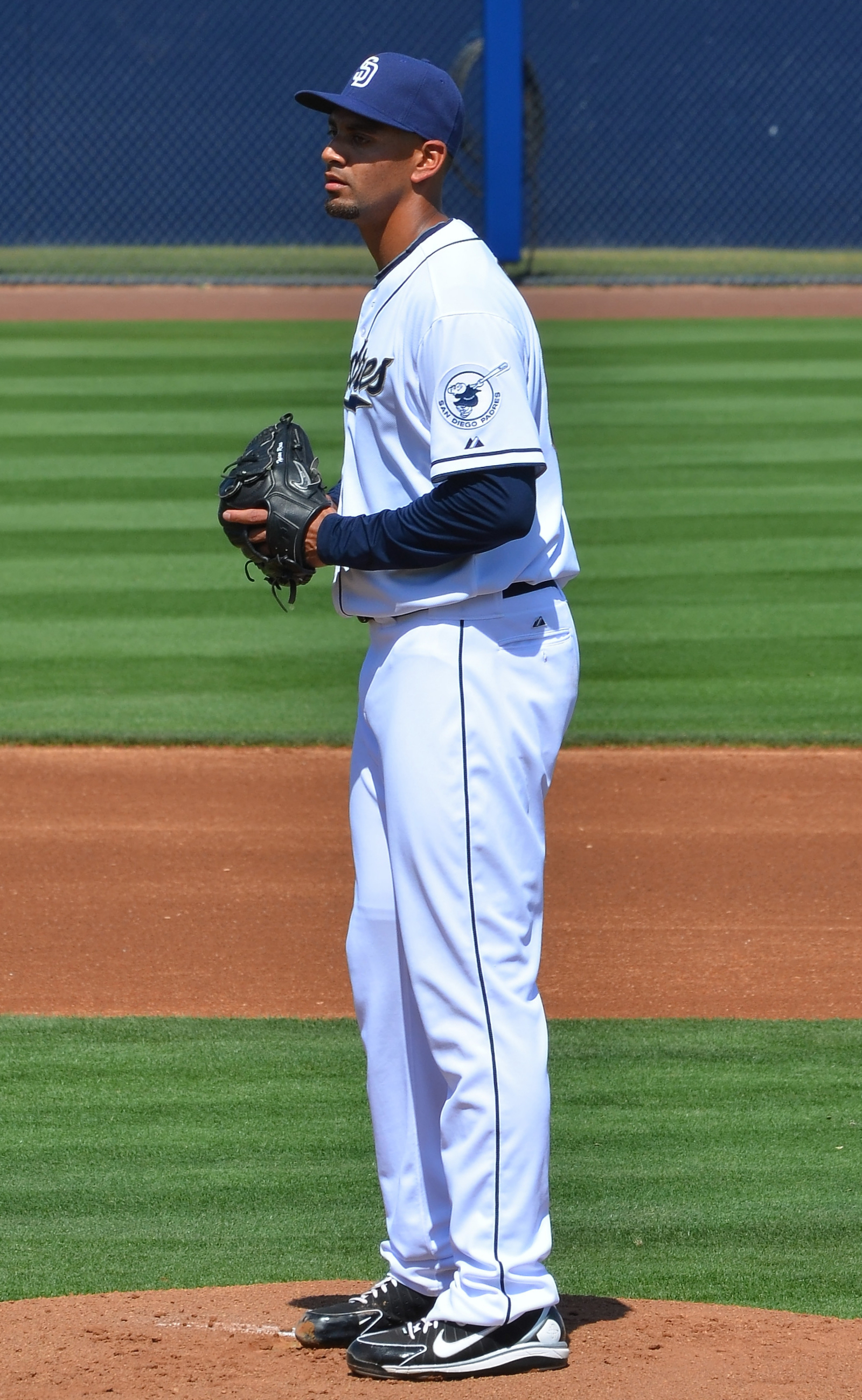
Ross with San Diego

On November 16, 2012, Ross was traded to the San Diego Padres with minor league infielder A. J. Kirby-Jones for Andy Parrino and Andrew Werner.

Ross competed for a starting job in 2013 spring training and won the fifth spot in the rotation. He made three starts for the Padres before suffering a left shoulder subluxation in the process of swinging for his first major league hit. Ross returned from the disabled list on May 5, but was relegated to the bullpen due to concern over his shoulder when batting. After working in relief through early July, Ross was sent down to Triple-A to build up his arm strength and returned to the starting rotation on July 23. He made 13 more starts for the Padres through the end of the year, posting a 2.93 ERA. The starts included two shutout performances of 7 and 8 innings that raised his prospects for returning to the starting rotation for the 2014 season. He finished the 2013 season with a 3–8 record in 35 games (16 starts) and a 3.17 ERA, with 119 strikeouts against 44 walks in 125 innings.

Ross then improved in 2014 with a 13–14 record and 2.81 ERA, with 195 strikeouts (8th in the National League) against 72 walks (8th), and 12 wild pitches (3rd), in 195 2/3 innings.} He gave up 7.589 hits per 9 innings pitched (5th in the NL), had 8.969 strikeouts per 9 innings pitched (8th), and gave up 0.598 home runs per 9 innings pitched (5th). He threw a Major League-leading 1,272 sliders. He received the 2014 Padres Clyde McCullough Pitcher of the Year Award.

Ross continued his success from the previous season in 2015 by starting a league-high 33 games and posting a career-high 212 strikeouts (6th in the National League), and 14 wild pitches (leading the league), in 196 innings while leading the league with 84 walks. He was 10-12 and had a 3.26 ERA. He gave up 7.898 hits per 9 innings pitched (9th in the NL), had 9.735 strikeouts per 9 innings pitched (4th), and gave up 0.413 home runs per 9 innings pitched (3rd). He received the 2015 Padres Clyde McCullough Pitcher of the Year Award.

He signed a one-year contract with the team in 2016 for $9.625 million. Ross was named the opening day starter for the 2016 season, but his season was cut short in the very first game of the season. He missed the remainder of the season with a shoulder injury and underwent surgery to relieve the symptoms of thoracic outlet syndrome in October, with the surgeon removing one of his ribs in the process. The Padres non-tendered him after the season, and he became a free agent.

=== Texas Rangers (2017) ===
Ross signed a one-year contract with the Texas Rangers on January 19, 2017, for $6 million. He made his debut with the team on June 16, earning the victory in a 10-4 win over the Seattle Mariners. On July 24, Ross was placed on the 10-day disabled list due to a blister on his right index finger. Ross was wildly inconsistent in his short stint with the Rangers, giving up 37 walks against 36 strikeouts in 49 innings. He was 3-3 in 12 appearances (10 starts) with a 7.71 ERA. He was released on September 12, 2017.

=== Second stint with San Diego Padres (2018) ===
On December 29, 2017, Ross signed a minor league contract to return to the Padres. Ross earned the fifth spot in the Padres rotation and was called up on April 3, 2018, to make his first start against the Colorado Rockies. On April 20, Ross and reliever Brad Hand combined for a one-hitter against the Arizona Diamondbacks. Ross pitched 7.2 innings and allowed the Diamondbacks' only hit, a double by Christian Walker in the eighth inning. The Padres won the game 4-1. With the Padres in 2018, in 22 starts he was 6-9 with a 4.45 ERA in 123 1/3 innings.

=== St. Louis Cardinals (2018) ===
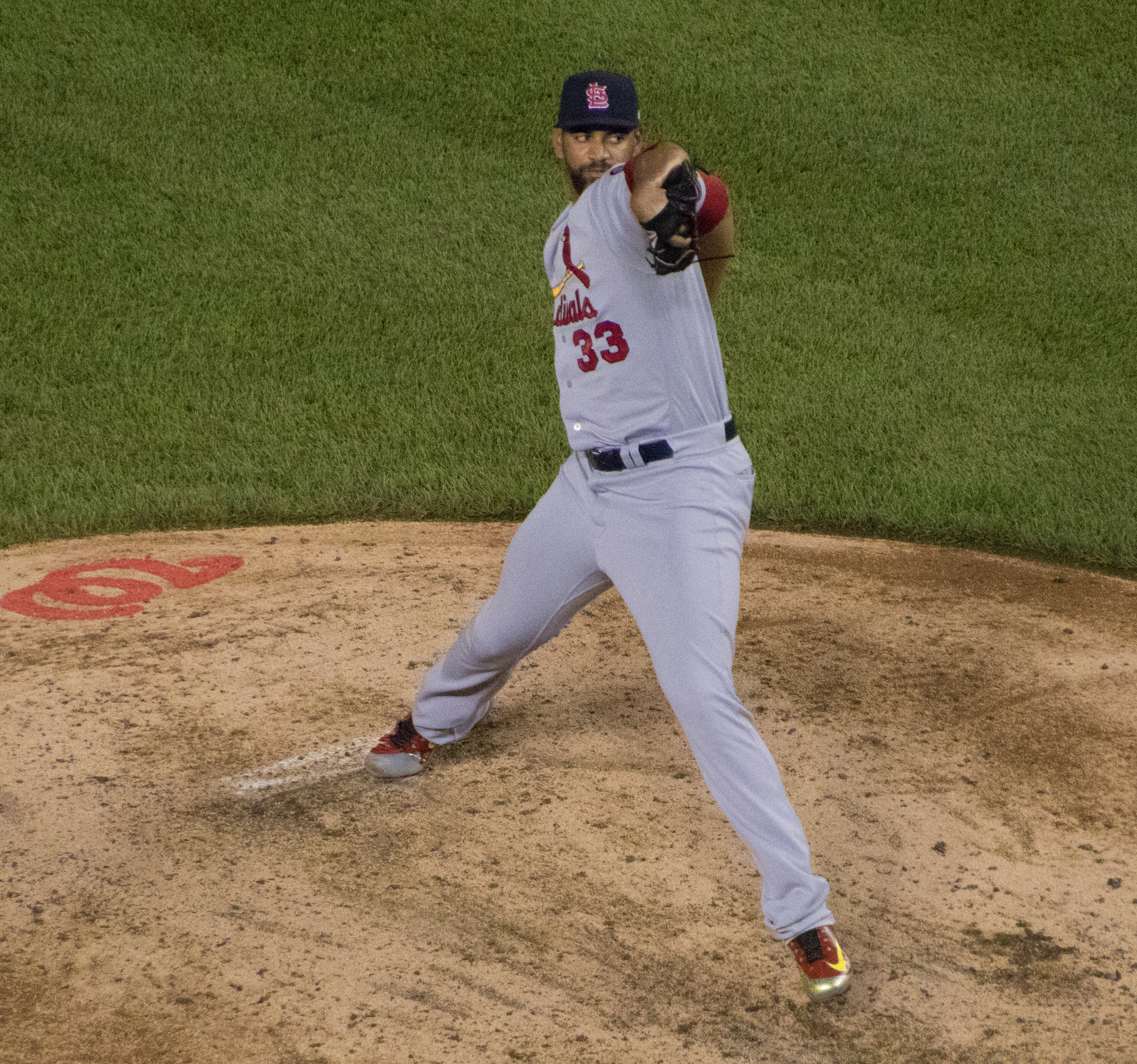
Ross with the St. Louis Cardinals in 2018

The St. Louis Cardinals claimed Ross off of waivers on August 5, 2018. For St. Louis, he appeared in nine games (one start), compiling a 2-0 record with a 2.73 ERA in 26 1/3 innings.

=== Detroit Tigers (2019) ===
On December 10, 2018, Ross signed a one-year $5.75 million contract with the Detroit Tigers. He won his first game as a Tiger in a 3–1 decision on April 7, 2019, against the Kansas City Royals, which was also the first game he ever pitched at Comerica Park. He was placed on the disabled list on May 12 due to ulnar nerve neuritis in his right elbow. He did not pitch after the injury, appearing in only 7 starts and finishing 2019 with a 1-5 record and a 6.11 ERA in 35 1/3 innings.

=== San Francisco Giants ===
On January 13, 2020, Ross signed a minor league contract with the San Francisco Giants with an invitation to spring training. Ross was released by the Giants organization on June 26, 2020. On July 2, Ross announced he would not participate in the 2020 season, the same decision his younger brother Joe Ross made.

=== Texas Rangers ===
On February 19, 2021, Ross signed a minor league contract with the Texas Rangers organization. On May 4, Ross was released from his minor league contract without making an appearances for the organization.

== Front office career ==
On February 18, 2023, Ross was hired by the Los Angeles Dodgers to serve as a special assistant in the player development and player performance departments.

== International career ==
Ross pitched for Team USA in 2007, including the Pan-American Games and the World Port Tournament. He also played for the 2004 and 2005 USA Baseball Junior National teams.

== Pitching style ==
Ross has four pitches. His best pitch is a four-seam fastball at 90–95 mph, and he also features a two seamer (90–95), a slider (84–89), and a changeup usually reserved for left-handed hitters (87–89). As a strikeout pitch for right-handers, he relies heavily on his slider.

== Personal life ==
Tyson's younger brother, Joe Ross, is also a baseball player. His father Willie is a pediatrician, and his mother Jean is an emergency room nurse in Oakland. His sister, Frankie, played soccer at Portland State University.
