= Brian Matusz =

American baseball player (1987–2025)

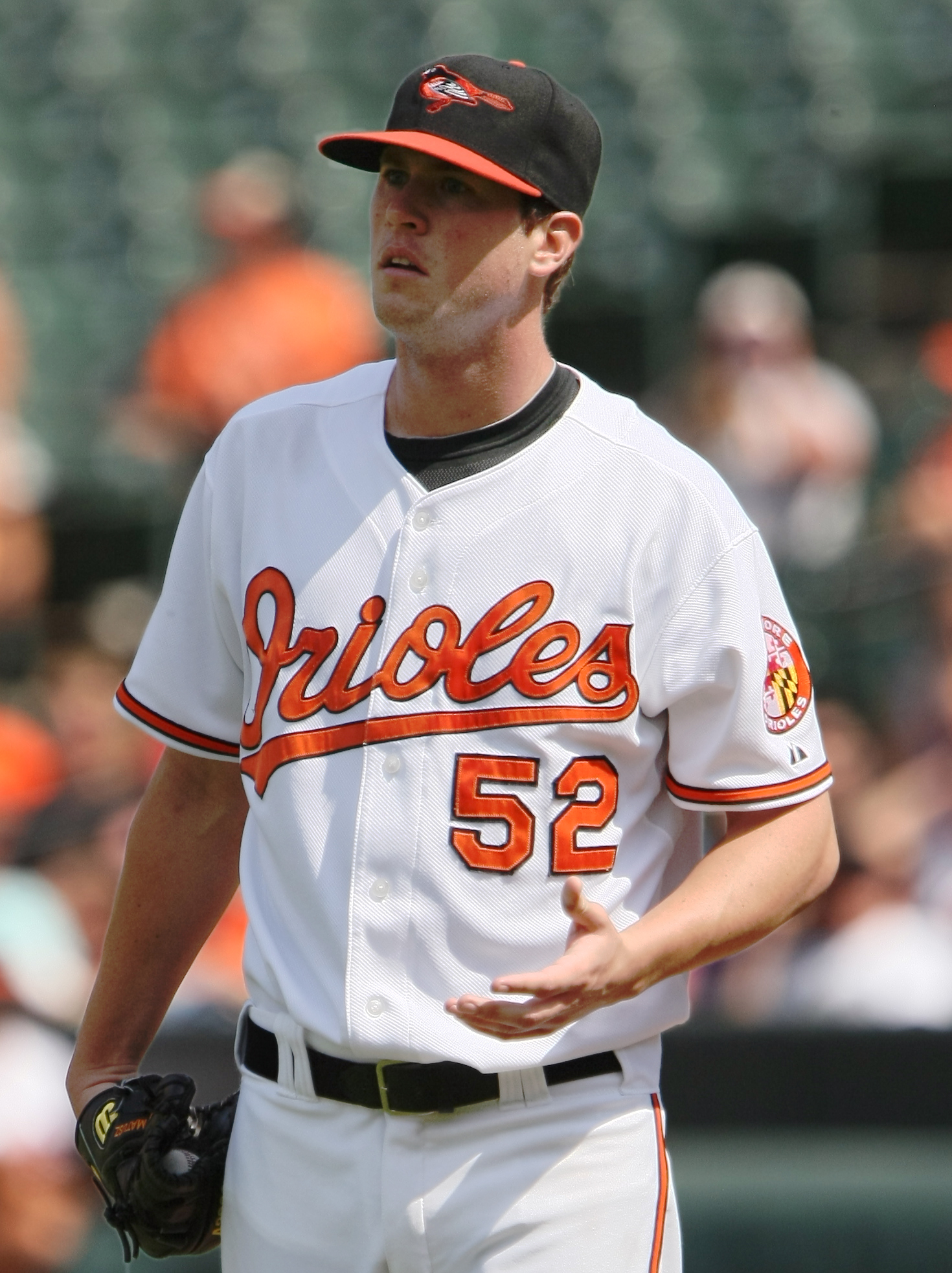
- Matusz with the Baltimore Orioles in 2009
- Pitcher
- Born: February 11, 1987; Grand Junction, Colorado, U.S.
- Died: January 6, 2025 (aged 37); Phoenix, Arizona, U.S.
- Batted: Left Threw: Left

MLB debut
- August 4, 2009, for the Baltimore Orioles

Last MLB appearance
- July 31, 2016, for the Chicago Cubs

MLB statistics
- Win–loss record: 27–41
- Earned run average: 4.92
- Strikeouts: 462
- Stats at Baseball Reference

Teams
- Baltimore Orioles (2009–2016); Chicago Cubs (2016)
Medals
Men's baseball
Representing United States
Pan American Games
Silver medal – second place	2007 Rio de Janeiro	Team

Brian Robert Matusz (/ˈmætəs/ MAT-əs; February 11, 1987 – January 6, 2025) was an American professional baseball pitcher. He played in Major League Baseball (MLB) for the Baltimore Orioles and the Chicago Cubs from 2009 to 2016.

== Amateur career ==
Matusz attended St. Mary's High School in Phoenix graduating in 2005. He was drafted by the Los Angeles Angels of Anaheim in the fourth round of the 2005 MLB draft but did not sign. Instead, he enrolled at the University of San Diego, where he played college baseball for the San Diego Toreros. Matusz, Josh Romanski, and Matt Couch anchored the Toreros starting rotation. In the summer of 2007, Matusz pitched for the U.S. national collegiate team, going 3–1 with a 1.33 ERA in four starts as the U.S. finished second in the Pan Am Games in Rio de Janeiro.

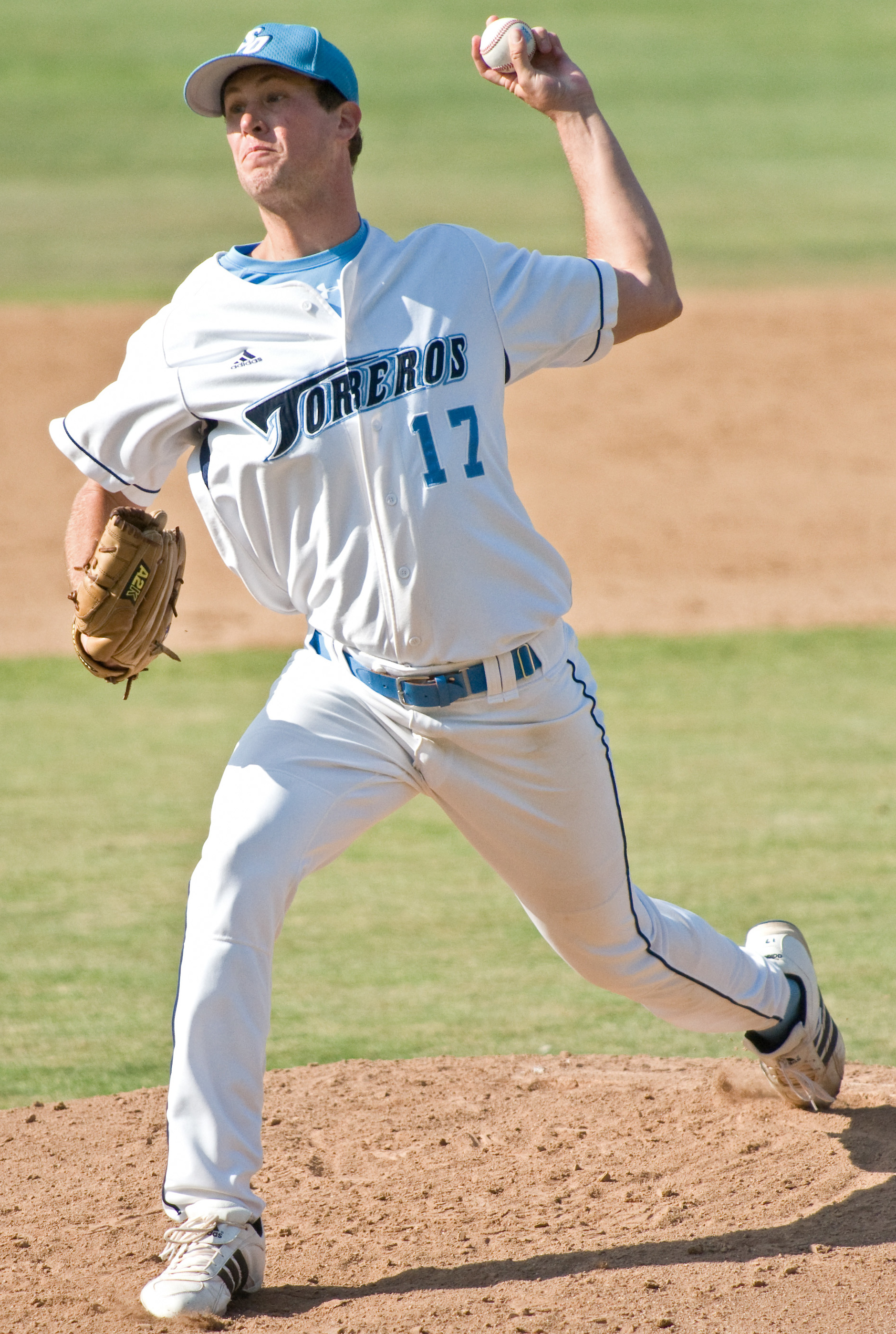
Matusz pitching for the San Diego Torreros, April 2008

In 2008 with San Diego, Matusz was named the West Coast Conference Pitcher of the Year, was a finalist for the Roger Clemens Award, and was a first-team All-American. He led the NCAA with 141 strikeouts and was 12–2 with a 1.71 ERA in 105 innings. In three season with San Diego, he had 396 strikeouts, a school record.

== Professional career ==
=== Baltimore Orioles ===
The Baltimore Orioles selected Matusz in the first round, with the fourth overall selection, in the 2008 MLB draft. Matusz signed a contract with the Orioles on August 15, 2008, the deadline to sign draft picks, receiving a $3.2 million signing bonus. The Orioles invited him to spring training as a non-roster player in 2009. In June 2009, he was promoted from the High-A Frederick Keys to the Double-A Bowie Baysox. He struck out 10 batters in his first start for Bowie on June 17. Matusz was named Baseball America's ninth best overall prospect mid-season in 2009. Before the 2010 season, Baseball America named him the fifth best prospect in all of baseball.

Matusz made his MLB debut on August 4, 2009, against the Detroit Tigers. He went five innings, allowing six hits, one earned run and striking out five. He earned a win in his effort. On September 14, the O's decided to shut him down for the remainder of the season, wary of overextending the rookie in his first big league season. He was named a starting pitcher on Baseball America's 2010 All-Rookie Team. Matusz missed the first two months of the 2011 season with an injury. He returned and had six starts finishing with a 1–4 record with an ERA above 7.00 before being demoted to Triple-A Norfolk on June 30 to work on his velocity. He was later recalled and continued to struggle, posting a 1–7 record and 9.84 ERA before his removal from the starting rotation in September.

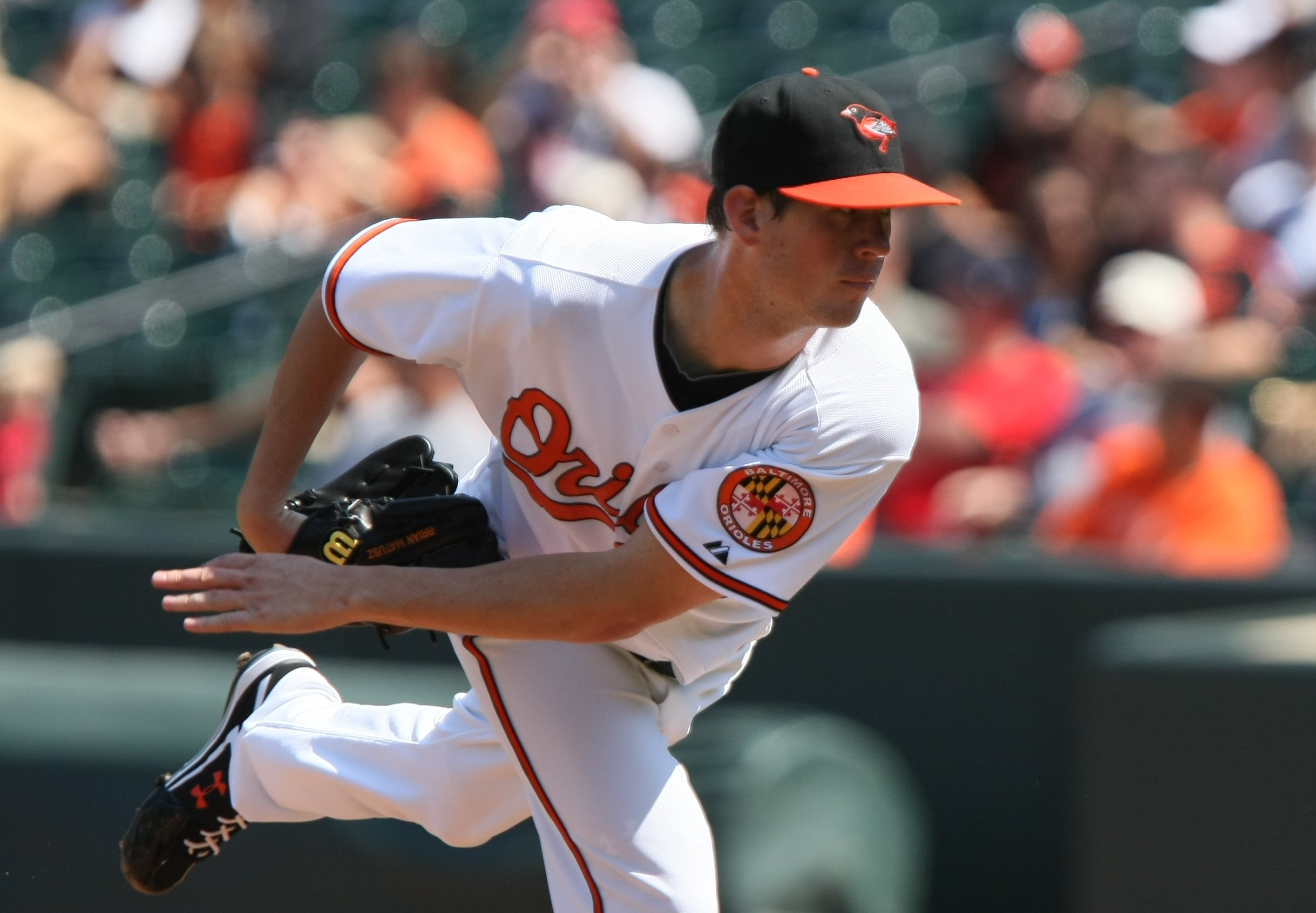
Matusz at home pitching against the Cleveland Indians, August 2009

Matusz began the 2012 season in the rotation, but was demoted to the bullpen in August. In the bullpen, he excelled, striking out 19 with a 1.35 ERA in 18 appearances. He also did not allow a single inherited runner to score. He pitched the last three months of the season with a rectus abdominis tear, preventing him from sprinting, but not pitching. He had surgery in October to repair the tear, and was expected to be back for spring training. In 2013, Matusz made the transition to full-time reliever, appearing in 65 games. He was 2–1 with a 3.53 ERA for the Orioles. On May 23, 2015, he was ejected from the game against the Miami Marlins in the 12th inning for having a foreign substance on his right forearm. He was the second pitcher to be ejected for a foreign substance that week. He was suspended for eight games. He posted a 2.94 ERA and 10.29 strikeouts per nine innings in 58 relief appearances in 2015. On February 4, 2016, Matusz and the Orioles agreed to a one-year deal to avoid arbitration.

On May 23, the Orioles traded Matusz and the 76th pick in the 2016 Major League Baseball draft to the Atlanta Braves for minor league pitchers Brandon Barker and Trevor Belicek. The Braves designated Matusz for assignment on June 1, shortly after trading for him.

=== Chicago Cubs ===
On June 15, 2016, the Chicago Cubs signed Matusz to a minor league contract. After being employed solely as a reliever since 2012, the Cubs assigned him to be a starter in the minors. On July 30, the Cubs called him up to start against the Seattle Mariners on July 31. However, after a poor outing in the game, the Cubs designated him for assignment the next day. He cleared waivers later and was outrighted to the Triple-A Iowa Cubs. Despite only appearing in one game for the Cubs during their 2016 World Series season, he was given a World Series ring. In his final MLB season, he allowed 14 runs in 9 innings in 8 games combined with the Orioles and Cubs. Matusz elected free agency following the season on November 7.

=== Arizona Diamondbacks ===
On February 13, 2017, Matusz signed a minor league contract with the Arizona Diamondbacks. In 11 games for the Triple-A Reno Aces, he struggled; his ERA was 6.11 with 13 strikeouts across 17 2/3 innings pitched. On May 16, he was released by the Diamondbacks.

=== Acereros de Monclova ===
On July 23, 2019, Matusz signed with the Acereros de Monclova of the Mexican League. He made one start, allowing five hits and five earned runs with three walks and two strikeouts in three innings of work.

=== Long Island Ducks ===
On August 2, 2019, Matusz signed with the Long Island Ducks of the Atlantic League of Professional Baseball. In 46 2/3 innings across nine starts, he went 2–3 with a 4.05 ERA and 45 strikeouts.

== Personal life and death ==
Matusz's brother, Chris, played college baseball at Iowa Wesleyan University in Mount Pleasant, Iowa.

On January 6, 2025, Matusz was discovered unconscious at his residence in Phoenix, Arizona by his mother. A cigarette lighter, straw, and set of aluminum foil were next to Matusz. There were also traces of fentanyl, heroin, and crack cocaine inside his residence. He was admitted to the hospital, where he was pronounced deceased upon arrival. He was 37 years of age. Authorities suspected no signs of foul play, but it was later determined that Matusz had accidentally overdosed. Prior to his death, Matusz resided in Phoenix after his retirement from baseball, dealing with depression and substance abuse.

In May 2025, four months after his death, a toxicology report was released, which confirmed that Matusz had indeed died from an accidental fentanyl overdose.
