= Danny Espinosa =

American baseball player (born 1987)

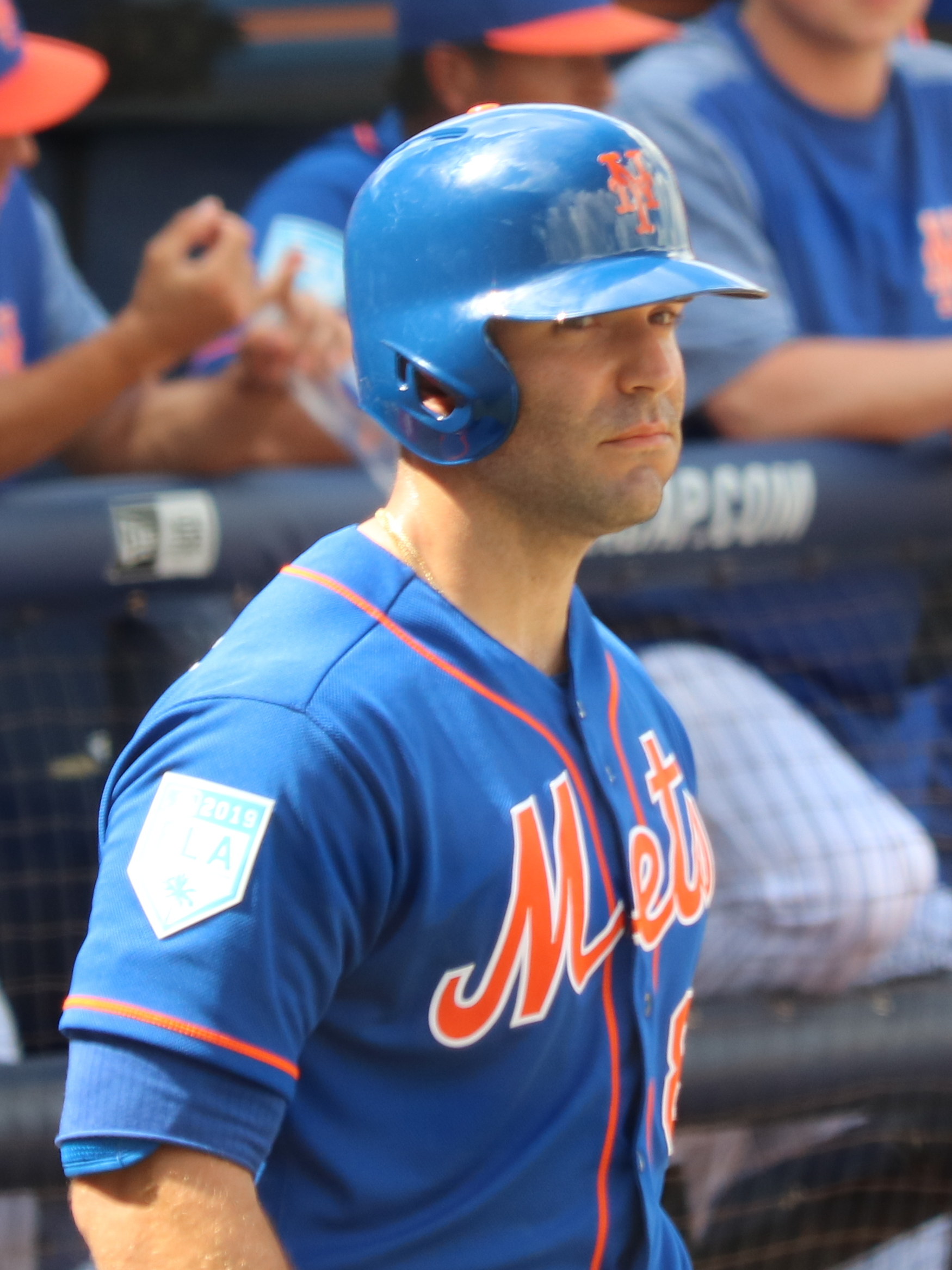
- Espinosa with the Mets in 2019
- Second baseman / Shortstop
- Born: April 25, 1987 (age 39); Santa Ana, California, U.S.
- Batted: Switch Threw: Right

MLB debut
- September 1, 2010, for the Washington Nationals

Last MLB appearance
- September 15, 2017, for the Tampa Bay Rays

MLB statistics
- Batting average: .221
- Home runs: 98
- Runs batted in: 316
- Stats at Baseball Reference

Teams
- Washington Nationals (2010–2016); Los Angeles Angels (2017); Seattle Mariners (2017); Tampa Bay Rays (2017)
Medals
Men's baseball
Representing United States
Pan American Games
| Silver medal – second place | 2007 Rio de Janeiro | Team |
World Youth Baseball Championship
| Gold medal – first place | 2003 Kaohsiung | Team |

Daniel Richard Espinosa OLY (born April 25, 1987) is an American former professional baseball infielder. He played in Major League Baseball (MLB) for the Washington Nationals, Los Angeles Angels, Seattle Mariners, and Tampa Bay Rays.

== Amateur career ==
Espinosa attended Mater Dei High School in Santa Ana, California. He then enrolled at California State University, Long Beach, to play college baseball for the Long Beach State Dirtbags. He played shortstop and batted .303 with 11 home runs and 98 runs batted in in his three-year career. As a freshman, he was the Big West Conference Freshman of the Year. After the 2006 season, he played collegiate summer baseball with the Chatham A's of the Cape Cod Baseball League.

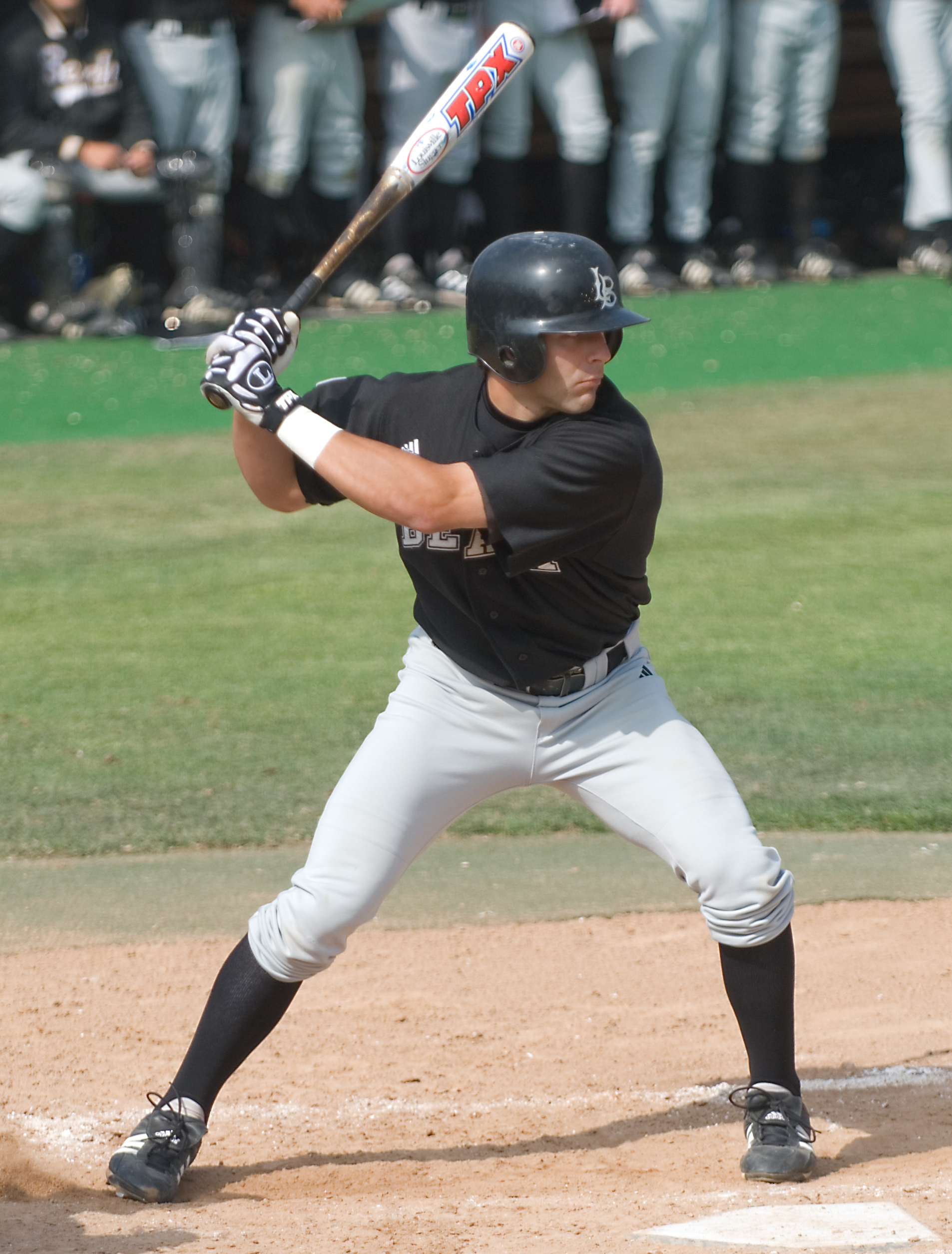
Espinosa at Long Beach State in 2007

== Professional career ==
=== Washington Nationals ===
==== Minor leagues ====
The Washington Nationals selected Espinosa in the third round, with the 87th overall pick, of the 2008 Major League Baseball draft. Espinosa made his professional debut with the Vermont Lake Monsters of the Low–A New York-Penn League, where he batted .328. The following year he was promoted to the Potomac Nationals of the High–A Carolina League, and hit .264 with a .375 on-base percentage while hitting 18 home runs with 72 runs batted in and 29 steals, and was a High-A and Carolina League All Star. He began 2010 with the Harrisburg Senators of the Double–A Eastern League, hitting .262 with 18 home runs, before being promoted to the Syracuse Chiefs of the Triple–A International League. With Syracuse, he hit .295 with four home runs and was just the second player in all of organized baseball to reach 20 home runs and 20 stolen bases in 2010. At Syracuse, Espinosa, who had played shortstop for his college and minor league career, was shifted to second base, since Ian Desmond was already playing shortstop for the Nationals.

==== Major leagues ====
When the MLB rosters expanded on September 1, 2010, Espinosa was called up to the major leagues for the first time. He appeared in his first MLB game that night. In his first MLB at bat, he hit a ground ball to second base that took an odd hop and went into right field, allowing Espinosa to turn it into a double when he saw that the right fielder had not charged the ball. On September 6, 2010, against the New York Mets, in his first MLB game at Nationals Park, Espinosa went 4-for-5 with two home runs (the second and third of his career) including a grand slam and six runs batted in. Espinosa played in the Puerto Rican winter league after the 2010 season.

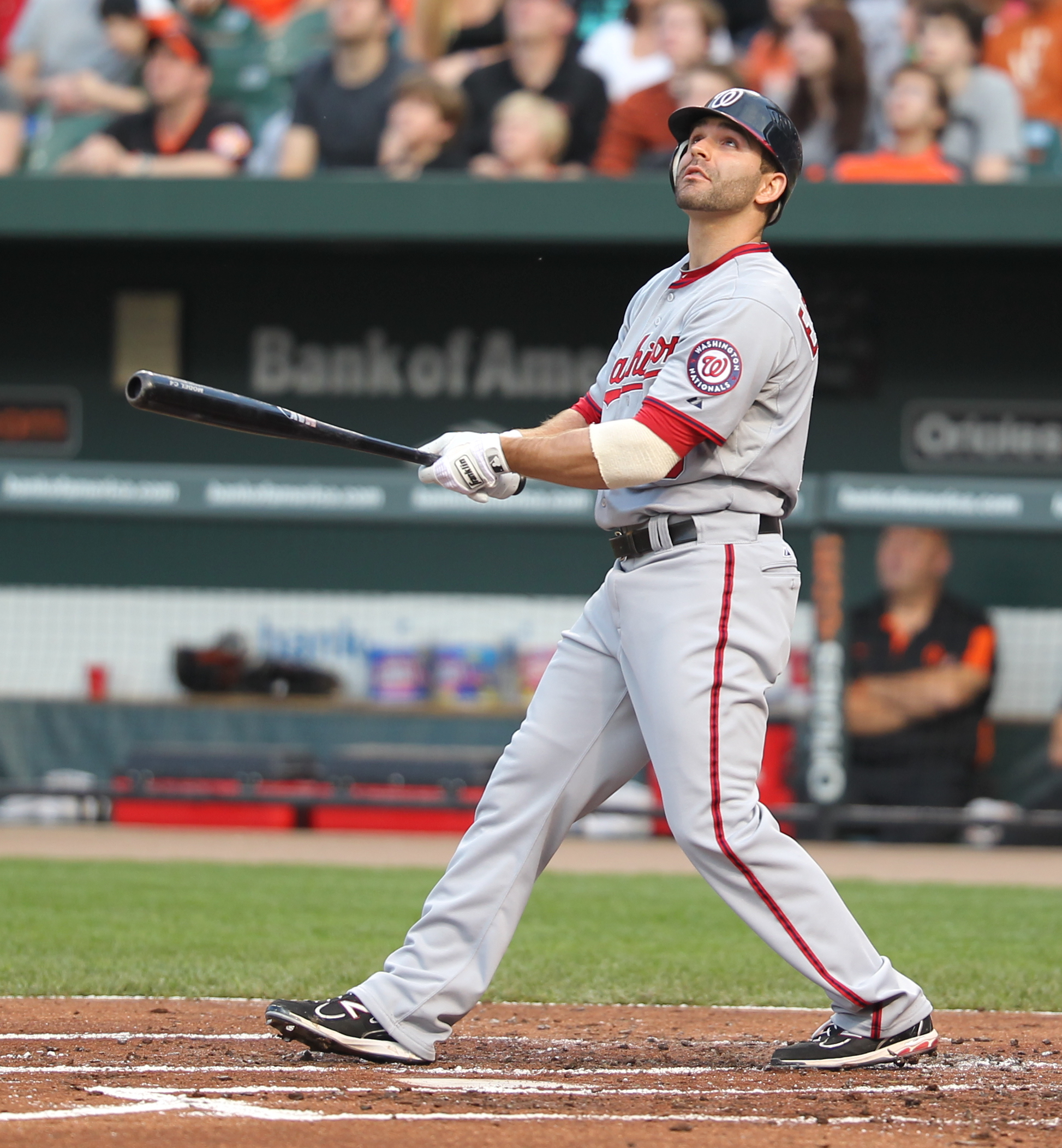
Espinosa with the Nationals

Espinosa had a productive 2011 season, hitting 21 home runs and stealing 17 bases. He finished 6th in the National League Rookie of the Year balloting. He was also hit by a pitch 19 times, tied for first with Justin Upton.

Espinosa began the 2012 season in an extended slump, hitting .205 in April with 2 runs batted in. He rebounded after the All-Star break, hitting .300 in July. Espinosa finished the 2012 season leading the National league in strikeouts with 189. He hit 17 home runs while also stealing 20 bases.

Espinosa began the 2013 season with another slump, hitting .171 through mid-May. He was consequently sent down to Triple–A Syracuse and batted .216 with 2 home runs, 22 runs batted in, and 6 stolen bases over 75 games for the rest of his season in the minors. In 44 games for the Nationals in 2013, Espinosa batted .158/.193/.272 with three home runs and 12 RBI.

The following two seasons, Espinosa was a utility player for the Nationals, playing all the infield positions and left field. In 2016, he was named the starting shortstop for the Nationals and played the whole season only at shortstop. He set career highs in home runs with 24 and runs batted in with 72, and was third in the majors in hit by pitches with 20. He was named National League Player of the Week in early July for a five-homer, 17-RBI performance. In this period he also became the first National to hit home runs from both sides of the plate in the same game, which he did twice, on June 30 and July 3, 2016. He finished the season with a career-high 24 home runs and 72 RBI, but his .209 batting average was the lowest of all qualified major league batters.

=== Los Angeles Angels ===
After the 2016 season, the Nationals acquired outfielder Adam Eaton, with the intent of moving Trea Turner to shortstop. The Nationals then traded Espinosa to the Los Angeles Angels for pitchers Austin Adams and Kyle McGowin on December 10, 2016.

Espinosa's first hit as an Angel was a big three-run home run in the ninth inning that put Los Angeles ahead, 7–6, in his second game with the team. The Angels closed out the win in the bottom of the ninth, making Espinosa's home run the game-winning hit. In his lone season with the team, Espinosa struggled offensively through the first half of the season, hitting under .170 in 75 games. On July 16, Espinosa was designated for assignment. He was released on July 22. He batted .162/.237/.276 in 228 at bats.

=== Seattle Mariners ===
Espinosa signed a major league contract with the Seattle Mariners on July 23, 2017. He batted .188/.235/.313 in 8 games with the team. Espinosa was released by Seattle on August 20.

=== Tampa Bay Rays ===
On August 25, 2017, Espinosa signed a major league contract with the Tampa Bay Rays. He batted .273/.333/.273 in 8 appearances for the Rays. On September 25, Espinosa was removed from the 40–man roster and sent outright to the Triple–A Durham Bulls.

=== Toronto Blue Jays ===
Espinosa signed a minor league contract with the New York Yankees on January 29, 2018. He was released prior to the start of the season on March 12.

On March 17, 2018, Espinosa signed a minor league contract with the Toronto Blue Jays that included an invitation to spring training. In 13 games for the Triple–A Buffalo Bisons, he hit .232/.271/.286 with no home runs and two RBI. Espinosa was released by the Blue Jays organization on April 29.

=== Los Angeles Dodgers ===
Espinosa signed a minor league deal with the Los Angeles Dodgers on May 6, 2018. He was subsequently assigned to the Triple–A Oklahoma City Dodgers, where he had nine hits in 60 at-bats prior to his release on May 30.

=== Philadelphia Phillies ===
On June 22, 2018, Espinosa signed a minor league contract with the Philadelphia Phillies. In 31 games for the Triple–A Lehigh Valley IronPigs, he slashed .200/.234/.352 with four home runs, 14 RBI, and three stolen bases. Espinosa was released by the Phillies organization on August 8.

=== Acereros de Monclova ===
On August 14, 2018, Espinosa signed with the Acereros de Monclova of the Mexican League. In 17 games he hit .349/.453/.508 with 2 home runs, 16 RBIs and 6 stolen bases.

=== New York Mets ===
On February 8, 2019, Espinosa signed a minor league contract with the New York Mets that included an invitation to spring training. He did not make the team and was assigned to the Triple–A Syracuse Mets, appearing on their Opening Day roster alongside a number of other veteran players. In 129 games for the Triple–A Syracuse Mets, Espinosa batted .256/.338/.440 with 20 home runs, 84 RBI, and 17 stolen bases. He elected free agency following the season on November 4.

=== Acereros de Monclova (second stint) ===
On February 29, 2020, Espinosa signed with the Acereros de Monclova of the Mexican League. Espinosa did not play in a game in 2020 due to the cancellation of the Mexican League season because of the COVID-19 pandemic. In 26 games for Monclova in 2021, he hit .281/.397/.521 with four home runs and 17 RBI. Espinosa retired from professional baseball on March 1, 2022.

== Personal life ==
Espinosa is of Mexican-American descent. He and his wife, Sara, had their first child, a son, in 2016. The family resides in Santa Ana, California.
