= Luis García (first baseman) =

Mexican baseball player (born 1978)

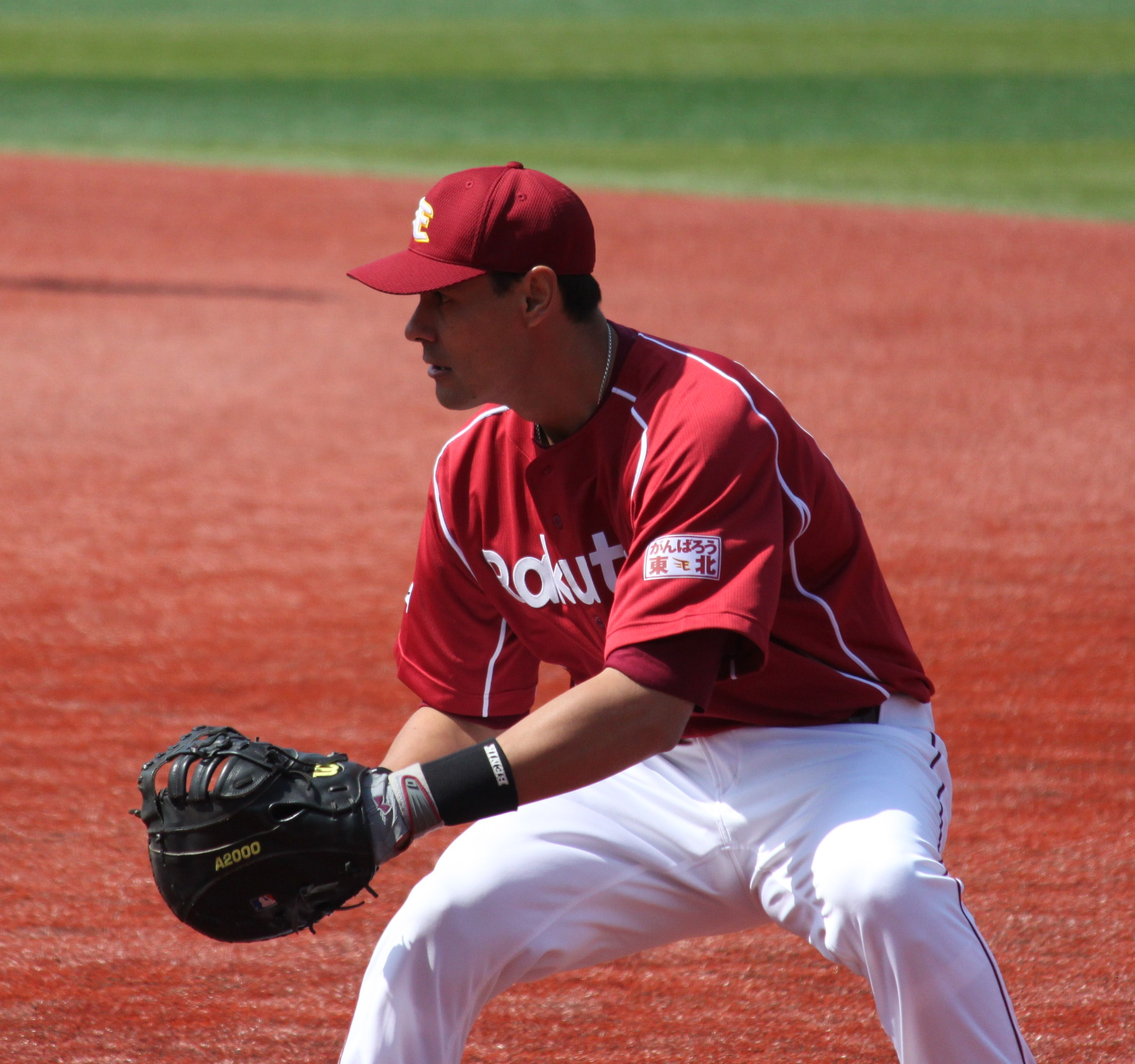
- García with the Tohoku Rakuten Golden Eagles
- First baseman / Designated hitter
- Born: November 5, 1978 (age 47); Guadalajara, Mexico
- Batted: Right Threw: Right

NPB debut
- June 9, 2011, for the Tohoku Rakuten Golden Eagles

Last NPB appearance
- October 2, 2012, for the Tohoku Rakuten Golden Eagles

NPB statistics (through 2012)
- Batting average: .245
- Home runs: 15
- RBI: 64
- Stats at Baseball Reference

Teams
- Tohoku Rakuten Golden Eagles (2011–2012)
Medals
Men's baseball
Representing Mexico
Pan American Games
Bronze medal – third place	2007 Rio de Janeiro	Team

Luis Alfonso García Etxebarria (born November 5, 1978) is a Mexican former professional baseball designated hitter and first baseman.

García played in the Boston Red Sox, St. Louis Cardinals, Cleveland Indians, Los Angeles Dodgers, and New York Mets minor league systems from 1997 to 2005. He signed with the Sultanes de Monterrey of the Mexican League in 2005, playing with them until 2014. He spent the 2015 and 2016 seasons with the Leones de Yucatán, and the 2017 season with the Diablos Rojos del México. He played part of the 2018 season with the Guerreros de Oaxaca before he was released in early May. In June, he signed with the Generales de Durango, and was released in mid-August. He retired as an active player following the conclusion of the 2018 season, and later became the general manager of the Águilas de Mexicali in the Mexican Pacific League.
