= Rafael Díaz (baseball) =

Mexican baseball player

- Pitcher
- Born: December 12, 1970 (age 55); Ciudad Juárez, Chihuahua, Mexico
- Batted: Right Threw: Right

NPB debut
- April 15, 2000, for the Seibu Lions

Last NPB appearance
- April 30, 2000, for the Seibu Lions

NPB statistics
- Win–loss record: 0–0
- Earned run average: 7.56
- Strikeouts: 7
- Stats at Baseball Reference

Teams
- Seibu Lions (2000)
Medals
Men's baseball
Representing Mexico
Pan American Games
Bronze medal – third place	2007 Rio de Janeiro	Team

Rafael Díaz Adame (born December 12, 1970) is a Mexican professional baseball pitcher who is a free agent.

Díaz was born in Ciudad Juárez and attended Bell High School in Bell, California. He was selected by the Montreal Expos in the 1988 Major League Baseball draft. At Bell, he was a teammate of Bobby Magallanes and, in 1987, was named the most valuable player of Division 3A of the CIF Los Angeles City Section by the Los Angeles Amateur Athletic Foundation.

He pitched for the Seibu Lions of Nippon Professional Baseball in 2000. In 2012, he played in the Mexican League for the Saraperos de Saltillo. He appeared in the 2009 World Baseball Classic for Mexico.

Díaz last played for the Generales de Durango of the Mexican League in 2019, when he was the oldest player in the league.
