= Alexander Mayeta =

Cuban baseball player

- Infielder
- Born: 22 February 1977 (age 49); Playa, Havana, Cuba
- Bats: Left Throws: Left

Teams
- Industriales (1991–2016); Naranjas de Villa Clara (2016–2017); Industriales (2017–2019)
Medals
Men's Baseball
Representing Cuba
Olympic Games
Silver medal – second place	2008 Beijing	Team
Baseball World Cup
Silver medal – second place	2007 Taipei	Team
Intercontinental Cup
Gold medal – first place	2006 Taichung	Team
Pan American Games
Gold medal – first place	2007 Rio de Janeiro	Team
Central American and Caribbean Games
Gold medal – first place	2006 Cartagena	Team

Alexander Mayeta (Note: Also spelled Malleta.) Kerr (born 22 February 1977) is a Cuban former first baseman with Industriales of the Cuban National Series. He was the play-off most valuable player in the National Series for the 2005–06 season.

== Play-off MVP season ==
Industriales won their 11th title in 2005–06, and Mayeta put up solid numbers for the team, though there were many other players with comparable statistics in the National Series. Mayeta hit a respectable .315, and his 15 home runs and 71 RBIs led the team (tied for 11th and 13th in the league, respectively). However, he was seventh on the team in doubles, and his .555 slugging percentage was far off the league-leading pace set by Michel Enríquez of Isla de la Juventud (.690).

=== Comparison ===
The following is a comparison of Mayeta's numbers with the last two MVP award winners, Yulieski Gourriel and Osmani Urrutia, and two other stars of the league. Leaders are shown in bold.

Statistic	Alexander Mayeta	Yulieski Gourriel	Michel Enríquez	Osmani Urrutia	Yoennis Céspedes
Avg.	.315	.327	**.447**	.425	.351
RBI	71	**92**	58	71	78
HR	15	**27**	12	13	23
Slg.	.555	.676	**.690**	.616	.649
