= Josh Romanski =

American baseball player (born 1986)

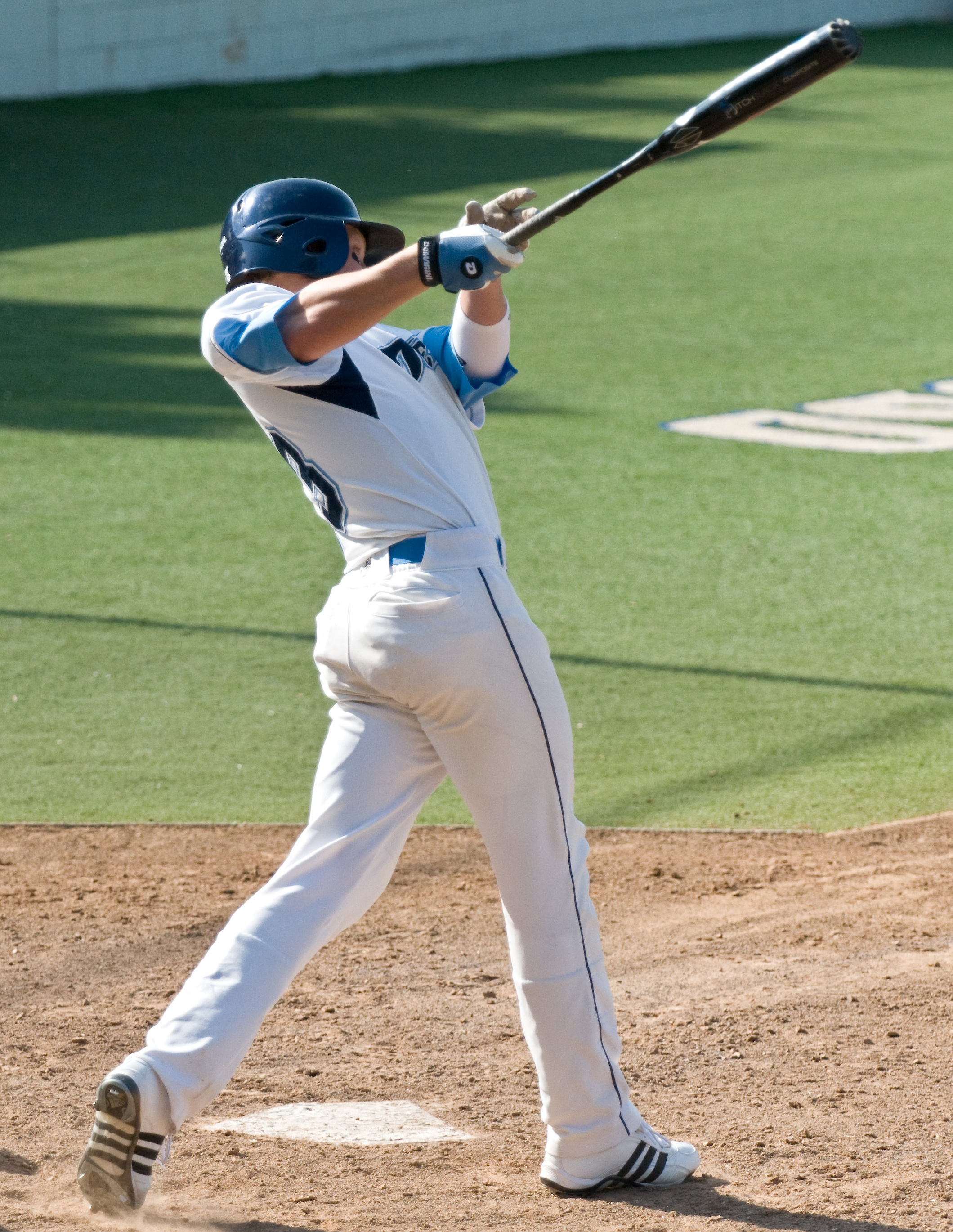
- Romanski with San Diego in 2008
- Outfielder
- Born: October 18, 1986 (age 39); Corona, California, U.S.
- Bats: Left Throws: Left
- Stats at Baseball Reference
Medals
Men's baseball
Representing United States
Pan American Games
Silver medal – second place	2007 Rio de Janeiro	Team

Joshua Michael Romanski (born October 18, 1986) is an American former professional baseball outfielder and left-handed pitcher. Prior to beginning his professional career, Romanski attended the University of San Diego.

== Amateur career ==
Romanski was drafted by the San Diego Padres in the 15th round of the 2005 Major League Baseball draft. Though Romanski and the Padres negotiated towards the signing deadline, the two parties could not reach an agreement, and Romanski enrolled at the University of San Diego. Playing for the San Diego Toreros baseball team in the West Coast Conference (WCC), Romanski established himself as a two-way threat, as a pitcher and outfielder. Collegiate Baseball named him a Freshman All-American and he won the WCC Freshman of the Year Award.

As a sophomore, Romanski was named a second-team All-American and first-team All-WCC. That summer, he played in the 2007 Pan American Games and 2007 World Port Tournament with Toreros teammate Brian Matusz. In his junior year, Romanski hit .324 and was 9–1 with a 4.00 ERA. He was first-team All-WCC and threw a no-hitter against the Harvard Crimson baseball team. Baseball America and Louisville Slugger named him a third-team All-American.

== Professional career ==
=== Milwaukee Brewers ===
The Milwaukee Brewers drafted Romanski in the fourth round (128th overall) of the 2008 Major League Baseball draft. After playing in four games for the Helena Brewers of the Rookie Advanced Pioneer League in 2008, Romanski missed the 2009 season with an arm injury that required Tommy John surgery.

=== New York Yankees ===
The Brewers released Romanski, and he signed with the New York Yankees as a minor league free agent on May 28, 2010.

Romanski pitched for the Charleston RiverDogs of the Single-A South Atlantic League and Tampa Yankees of the High-A Florida State League in 2010. Romanski began the 2011 season with Tampa, but was promoted to the Trenton Thunder of the Double-A Eastern League, where he was used as a relief pitcher. With Trenton and Tampa, Romanski posted a 7–6 record and 2.97 ERA with 83 strikeouts over 106 innings of work.

Romanski split the 2012 season between Trenton and the Low-A Staten Island Yankees, accumulating a 1–2 record and 4.00 ERA with 28 strikeouts in 36 innings pitched across 17 appearances (three starts). He began the 2013 season with Trenton, logging a 2–0 record and 2.00 ERA with 11 strikeouts in six games. Following a promotion to the Triple-A Scranton/Wilkes-Barre RailRiders, Romanski allowed five runs on four hits in one inning, which was his only appearance for the affiliate.

=== Chicago White Sox ===
During the 2013 season, Romanski was traded to the Chicago White Sox. In 15 appearances for the Double-A Birmingham Barons, he compiled a 1–1 record and 6.26 ERA with 20 strikeouts over 23 innings of work. Romanski was released by the White Sox organization on August 19, 2013.

=== Gary SouthShore RailCats ===
Romanski converted to an outfielder and spent the 2014 season in independent ball, in the American Association of Professional Baseball with the Gary SouthShore RailCats. In 96 appearances for the RailCats, Romanski slashed .311/.364/.437 with seven home runs, 60 RBI, and 11 stolen bases.

=== Mitsubishi ===
Romanski spent the 2015 season playing for Mitsubishi of the Japanese Industrial League.

=== Winnipeg Goldeyes ===
On November 30, 2015, Romanski signed with the Winnipeg Goldeyes of the American Association of Professional Baseball. He made 91 appearances for the Goldeyes in 2016, batting .305/.409/.473 with nine home runs, 64 RBI, and seven stolen bases.

Romanski signed a minor league contract with the Minnesota Twins in the 2017 offseason, but was released prior to the beginning of the 2017 season. He re-signed with the Winnipeg Goldeyes for the season, batting .324 with 11 home runs and 81 RBI in 98 games as he helped the team win its second consecutive championship and was named league MVP.

=== Pericos de Puebla ===
On March 22, 2018, Romanski signed with the Pericos de Puebla of the Mexican League. In 27 appearances for Puebla, he batted .226/.344/.358 with two home runs, 10 RBI, and one stolen base. Romanski was released by the Pericos on May 1.

=== Winnipeg Goldeyes (second stint) ===
Romanski later re-signed with the Winnipeg Goldeyes on June 22, 2018. He made 69 appearances for the Goldeyes, batting .313/.373/.399 with four home runs, 30 RBI, and two stolen bases.

Romanski made 33 appearances for Winnipeg in 2019, slashing .266/.336/.305 with eight RBI and five stolen bases. Romanski was released by the Goldeyes on June 24, 2019.

=== St. Paul Saints ===
On July 19, 2019, Romanski signed with the St. Paul Saints of the American Association of Independent Professional Baseball. In eight appearances for St. Paul, he went 6-for-30 (.200) with two RBI and two walks. Romanski was released by the Saints on July 29.

== Personal ==
The same day he was drafted by the Brewers, Romanski's mother was diagnosed with breast cancer. His younger brother Jake is a catcher in the Boston Red Sox organization.
