= Mauricio Tequida =

Mexican baseball player (born 1982)

- Pitcher
- Born: 2 June 1982 (age 43); Ciudad Obregón, Sonora, Mexico
- Bats: Right Throws: Right
- Stats at Baseball Reference

Teams
- Diablos Rojos del México (2005–2009); Guerreros de Oaxaca (2010–2011); Piratas de Campeche (2012–2013); Delfines del Carmen (2013)
Medals
Men's baseball
Representing Mexico
Pan American Games
Bronze medal – third place	2007 Rio de Janeiro	Team

Mauricio Humberto Tequida Miranda (born 2 June 1982) is a Mexican former professional baseball pitcher. He played seventeen seasons in the Mexican League (LMB) from 2001 to 2017, and ten seasons in the Mexican Pacific League (LMP) from 2002 and 2012.

Tequida represented Mexico, winning the bronze medal at the 2007 Pan American Games.

== Professional career ==
=== Minor leagues ===
In 2003, Tequida was signed by the Los Angeles Dodgers organization. He began his professional career that season with the Gulf Coast League Dodgers at the rookie level, appearing in 13 games and posting a 0–4 record with a 2.49 ERA. He also made three appearances with the Vero Beach Dodgers of the High-A Florida State League. During the 2004 season, Tequida returned to the Vero Beach Dodgers, where he appeared in five games, finishing with a 0–2 record and a 5.25 ERA.

=== Mexican League ===
In 2005, Tequida joined the Diablos Rojos del México as a reliever, making his Mexican League (LMB) debut. He remained with the club through the 2009 season, establishing himself as a reliable reliever, recording 26 saves with the Diablos.

For the 2010 and 2011 seasons, Tequida pitched for the Guerreros de Oaxaca before moving on to the Piratas de Campeche, where he played during the 2012 and 2013 seasons. He also spent part of the 2013 season with the Delfines del Carmen, retiring after the end of the season.

=== Mexican Pacific League ===
Tequida also played winter baseball in the Mexican Pacific League (LMP). He made his debut in 2002, playing for the Mayos de Navojoa, where he remained until 2005. He played the 2005–06 season with the Tomateros de Culiacán. From 2006 to 2010, he played for the Naranjeros de Hermosillo and from 2010 to 2012 for the Águilas de Mexicali.

== International career ==
Tequida was part of the Mexican team that won the bronze medal at the 2007 Pan American Games in Rio de Janeiro. He appeared in two games as a reliever, both in the preliminary round, against Cuba and Venezuela, pitching 0.1 innings and allowing four hits.
