= Logan Forsythe =

American baseball player (born 1987)

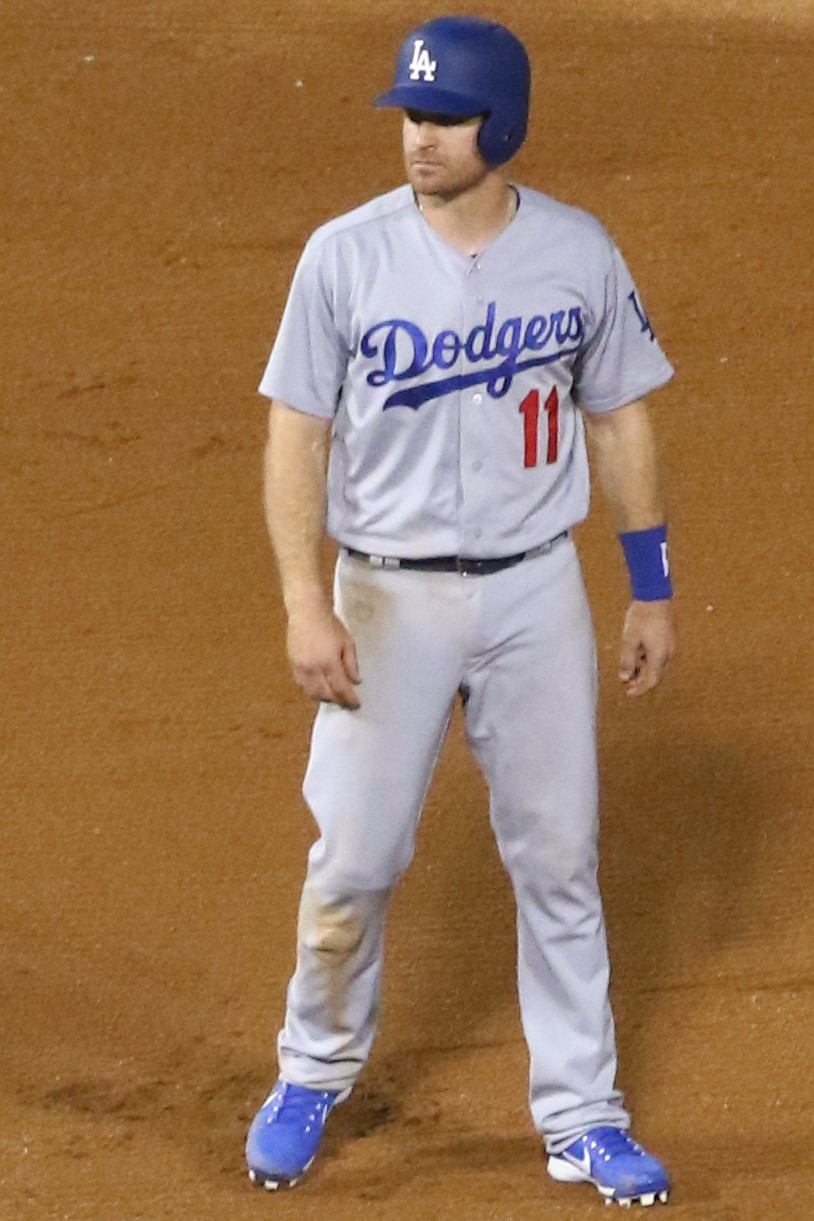
- Forsythe with the Los Angeles Dodgers in 2017
- Second baseman
- Born: January 14, 1987 (age 39); Memphis, Tennessee, U.S.
- Batted: Right Threw: Right

MLB debut
- May 4, 2011, for the San Diego Padres

Last MLB appearance
- August 25, 2020, for the Miami Marlins

MLB statistics
- Batting average: .244
- Home runs: 71
- Runs batted in: 307
- Stats at Baseball Reference

Teams
- San Diego Padres (2011–2013); Tampa Bay Rays (2014–2016); Los Angeles Dodgers (2017–2018); Minnesota Twins (2018); Texas Rangers (2019); Miami Marlins (2020)
Medals
Men's baseball
Representing United States
Pan American Games
Silver medal – second place	2007 Rio de Janeiro	Team

John Logan Forsythe (born January 14, 1987) is an American former professional baseball infielder. He played in Major League Baseball (MLB) for the San Diego Padres, Tampa Bay Rays, Los Angeles Dodgers, Minnesota Twins, Texas Rangers and Miami Marlins. While primarily a second baseman, Forsythe has played at least one game at every position except for center field and catcher.

Prior to playing professionally, Forsythe played college baseball for the University of Arkansas. He has also competed for the United States national baseball team.

== Amateur career ==
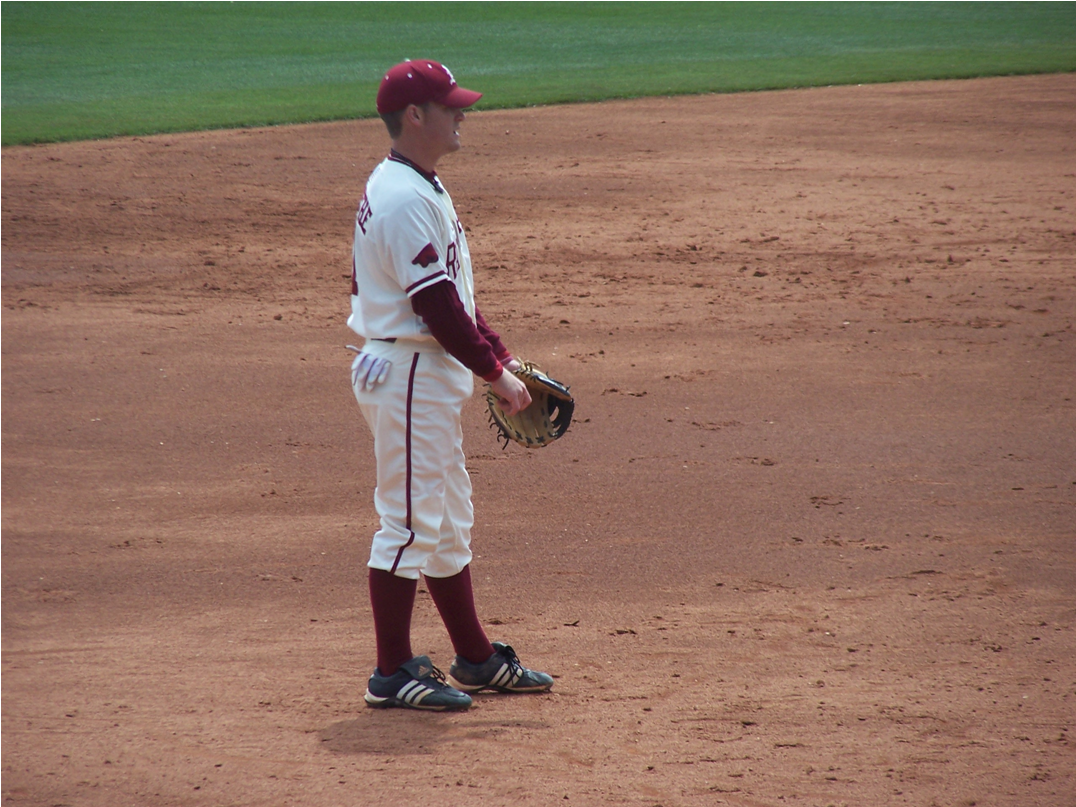
Forsythe playing third base for the Diamond Hogs in Baum Stadium in 2007.

Forsythe played baseball at Christian Brothers High School in Memphis, Tennessee, where he led his team to the 2005 state championship while batting .527 with 58 runs batted in (RBIs) and two stolen bases. He was recruited by the University of Arkansas to play college baseball for the Arkansas Razorbacks. Forsythe's mother had also attended Arkansas.

Forsythe intended to take a medical redshirt in 2006, but entered a game after an early-season injury. As a Freshman, he appeared in 28 games and had a batting average of .189. He became the team's starting third baseman as a Sophomore and improved to hit .347 in 61 games with nine home runs, 55 RBI and 18 stolen bases. He led the team in hits (78), doubles (16), steals and on-base percentage (.556). In post-season play, he hit .333 in the SEC baseball tournament and .267 in the Fayetteville Regional.

As a Junior, he was named a third-team pre-season All-American, and also named to USA Baseball's pre-season Golden Spikes Award Watch list. He played in 51 games, hitting .351 with seven homers and 34 RBI. He was named to the All-Southeastern Conference first team at the conclusion of the season.

== Professional career ==
=== San Diego Padres ===
The San Diego Padres chose Forsythe in the supplemental first round (46th overall pick) of the 2008 MLB draft. He signed with the Padres on June 5, 2008 for a $835,000 bonus. He began his career that season in the low minors, appearing in nine games for the Arizona League Padres and three for the Eugene Emeralds.

Forsythe began 2009 with the Lake Elsinore Storm of the California League where he hit .322 in 66 games and was named to the mid-season All-Star Team. On June 25, 2009, he was promoted to the Double-A San Antonio Missions of the Texas League, and he hit .279 in 66 games for them.

In 2010, Forsythe was switched to second base and played the entire season for the Missions, hitting .253 in 107 games with 38 RBI and 17 steals. He also led the league in walks, despite missing over a month with a broken hand. He was invited to spring training by the Padres as a non-roster player in 2011 before he was assigned to the Triple-A Tucson Padres of the Pacific Coast League to begin the season.

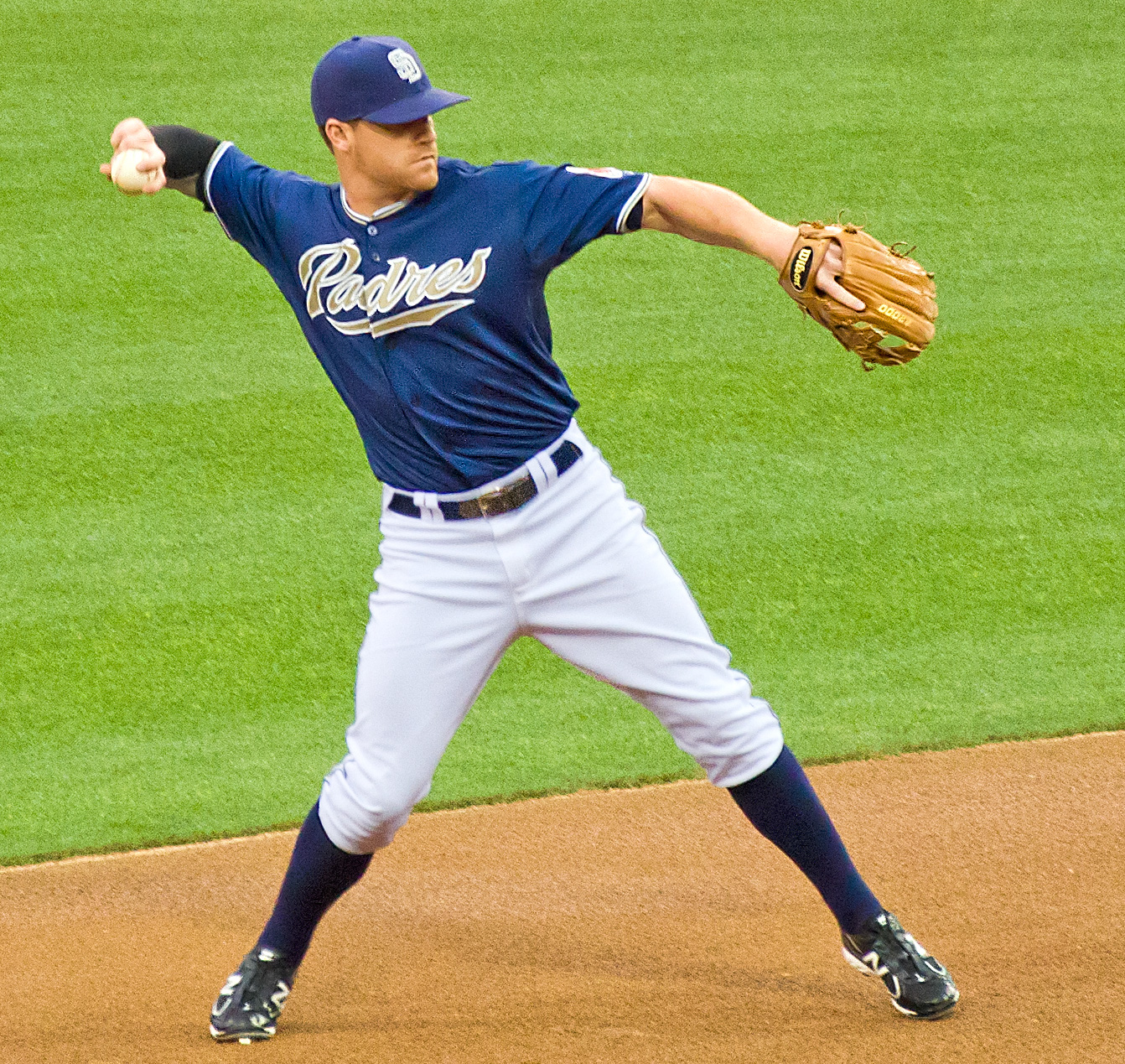
Forsythe playing for the San Diego Padres in 2011

Forsythe was called up to the MLB for the first time on May 4, 2011 and made his MLB debut that day, appearing as a pinch hitter in the fifth inning against Kevin Correia of the Pittsburgh Pirates and grounding out to shortstop.

Forsythe was optioned and recalled three more times during the summer of 2011 and recorded his first MLB hit on May 28, a single to left field of Henry Rodríguez of the Washington Nationals. Forsythe was mostly used as a pinch hitter or late inning defensive replacement until Chase Headley broke his pinkie and went on the disabled list in August, and Forsythe took over as the regular third baseman until his 2011 season was ended by knee surgery. He finished 2011 with a .213/.281/.287 line in 36 starts and 62 total games.

Forsythe was a candidate to make the 2012 Opening Day roster as a utility infielder, but a broken sesamoid in his left foot required surgery during spring training and he opened the season on the disabled list. After a brief stop in Triple-A, Forsythe returned to the Major League club on June 3 and became the regular second baseman. Forsythe made 73 starts at second base and also put in time at shortstop and third base. He finished 2012 hitting .273/.343/.390 with 6 home runs. He hit for a .313 batting average at Petco Park, the highest single-season average for any player at Petco Park with more than 110 at-bats. His first major league home run was a walk-off on June 5 off of Steve Edlefsen of the San Francisco Giants.

Forsythe was sidelined by plantar fasciitis in spring training and opened the 2013 season on the 60-day disabled list. After a brief rehab stint with Triple-A Tucson, he was activated on June 10 when Jedd Gyorko went to the DL with a groin strain. Forsythe manned second base until Gyorko returned in mid-July, and then served the club in a utility role playing shortstop, second, and third as well as both corner outfield positions. His plantar fasciitis returned at the end of the season, and he was largely limited to a pinch hitting role. Forsythe batted .214/.281/.332 on the season with 6 home runs in 75 games played and 220 at-bats.

=== Tampa Bay Rays ===
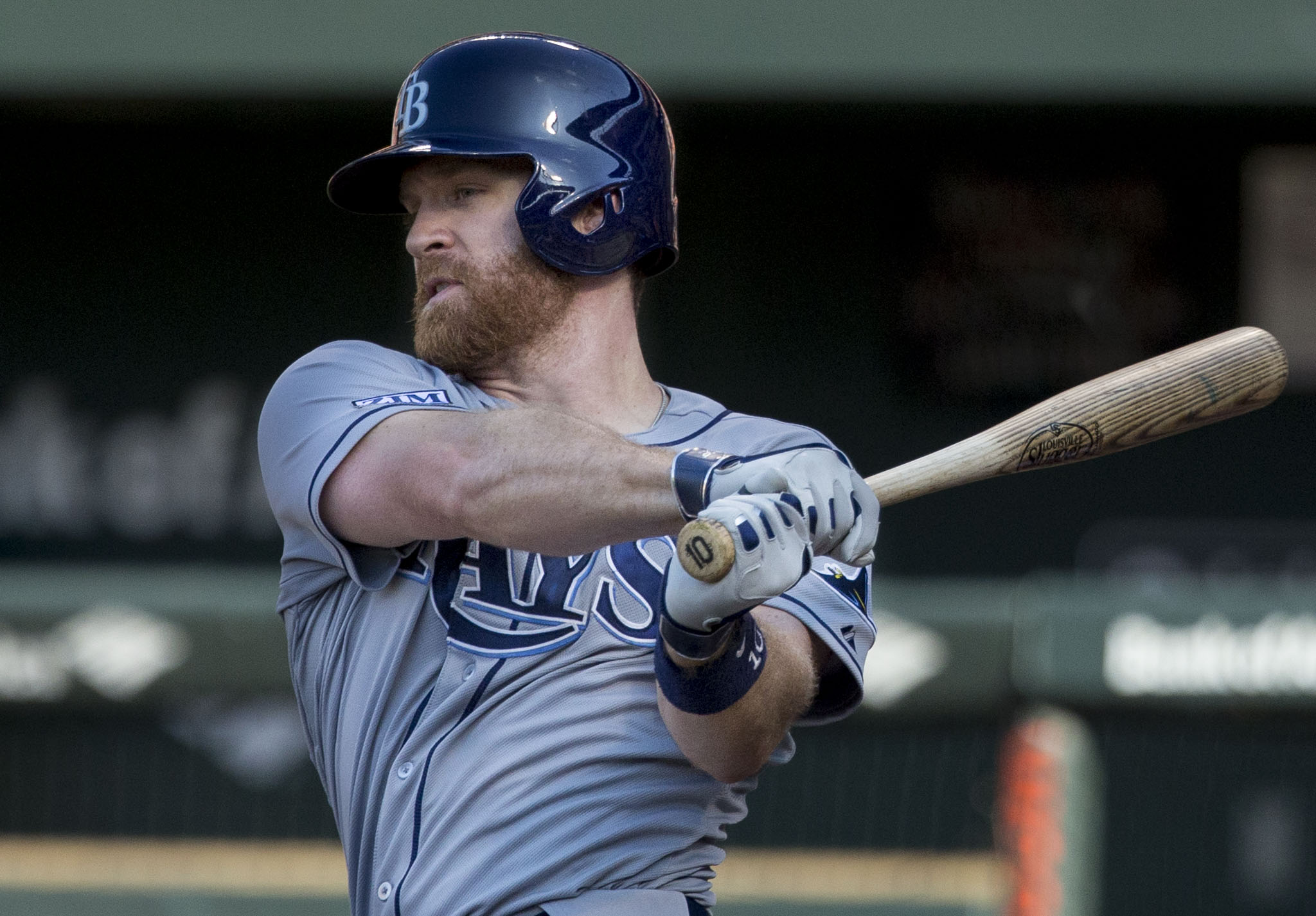
Forsythe with the 2014 Tampa Bay Rays

On January 22, 2014, the Padres traded Forsythe, Brad Boxberger, Matt Lollis, Matt Andriese, and Maxx Tissenbaum to the Tampa Bay Rays in exchange for Alex Torres and Jesse Hahn.

In 2014, Forsythe slashed .223/.287/.329 with 6 home runs in 110 games with the Rays. He played First, Second, Third, Short, and Outfield in his first season with the Rays.

In 2015, Forsythe had a career year. Slashing .281/.359/.444 while hitting a well-over career-high 17 home runs (previously 6) and 68 RBI (previously 26). He took advantage of an increase in at-bats and become one of the Rays' offensive leaders. Forsythe's numbers became even more impressive once turned into sabermetrics, the WAR measurements had Forsythe at 5.12, the second best 2nd baseman and 32nd best overall player.

After the season, Forsythe signed a two-year contract with a club option for the 2018 year to return to the Rays. He finished his 2016 season with a .264 batting average and a career-high 20 home runs.

=== Los Angeles Dodgers ===
On January 23, 2017, the Rays traded Forsythe to the Los Angeles Dodgers in exchange for José De León. On April 19, 2017, Forsythe was placed on the 10-day disabled list due to a fractured big right toe. The injury kept him sidelined for 30 games, and he did not rejoin the Dodgers until May 23. He struggled with his swing after his return, blaming his problems on his timing being thrown off by the injury. On the season, he played in 119 games, with a .224 batting average, six home runs and 36 RBI. Against right-handed pitching, he hit only .190, leading to him platooning with Chase Utley for much of the second half of the season. He also played a career-high 42 games at third base, filing in for Justin Turner. He played in 14 of the Dodgers 15 playoff games, including all seven games of the 2017 World Series. He hit .297 with 11 hits in 37 at-bats and also walked nine times in the playoffs.

The Dodgers exercised his option for the 2018 season on November 6, 2017. Forsythe played 70 games with the Dodgers in 2018, batting .207 with 2 home runs and 13 RBI.

=== Minnesota Twins ===
On July 31, 2018, Forsythe was traded to the Minnesota Twins, along with minor leaguers Devin Smeltzer and Luke Raley, for Brian Dozier. In the second half of the season with the Minnesota Twins, Forsythe appeared in 50 games batting .258 with no home runs and 14 RBIs.

=== Texas Rangers ===
On February 26, 2019, the Texas Rangers signed Forsythe to a minor league deal with a non-roster invitation to spring training. On March 22, 2019, the Texas Rangers announced that Forsythe had made the opening day roster as their utility infielder. Forsythe hit .227/.325/.353/.678 with 7 home runs and 39 RBI over 101 games for Texas in 2019.

=== Philadelphia Phillies ===
On February 5, 2020, Forsythe signed a minor league deal with the Philadelphia Phillies. He was released on July 18, 2020.

=== Miami Marlins ===
On July 28, 2020, Forsythe signed a deal with the Miami Marlins after being released by the Philadelphia Phillies. On August 3, Forsythe was selected to the active roster. Forsythe appeared in 12 games for the Marlins, slashing .118/.211/.235 before being placed on the 60-day injured list with a right oblique strain and missing the remainder of the season.

=== Milwaukee Brewers ===
On May 4, 2021, Forsythe signed a minor league contract with the Milwaukee Brewers organization and was assigned to the Triple-A Nashville Sounds. Forsythe hit .250/.483/.400 in 17 games with Nashville before being released on June 18.

== Post-playing career ==
On February 26, 2024, Forsythe joined Razorback Sports Network as a TV analyst.

== International career ==
Forsythe was selected to be part of the United States national baseball team in the summer of 2007. His team placed second at the Pan American Games and third at the World Port tournament.

In May 2021, Forsythe was named to the roster of the national team for the Americas Qualifying Event.

== Personal life ==
Forsythe married longtime girlfriend Ally Atkins on November 15, 2014. The two met while they were both attending the University of Arkansas. The couple's first child, a son, was born in 2016. Their second child, a girl, was born in February 2021.
