= City of Rock =

Events venue in Rio de Janeiro, Brazil

- Cidade do Rock
- Interactive map of City of Rock
- Address: Barra da Tijuca, Rio de Janeiro; Brazil
- Coordinates: 22°58′44″S 43°24′00″W

The City of Rock (Cidade do Rock), located in Barra da Tijuca, Rio de Janeiro, is an events venue best known for hosting the music festival Rock in Rio.

== Old City of Rock ==
The City of Rock was created for the Rock in Rio festival in 1985. In 2001, the event returned there for its third edition. It held crowds of up to 250,000 people in one night.

With the name "Complexo Esportivo Cidade do Rock" (City of Rock Sports Complex), the area became one of the venues of the 2007 Pan American Games. Temporary stadiums for baseball and softball, with a capacity of 3,000 and 2,000 respectively, were erected on the site. The venue suffered with rain and power shortages, and both tournaments had games cancelled for bad field conditions.

The Olympic Village for the 2016 Summer Olympics was built upon the original site of the City of Rock.

== New City of Rock ==
New City of Rock was constructed to the southeast of the nearby Riocentro exhibition center, in a partnership between the city of Rio de Janeiro and Rock in Rio creator Roberto Medina. Known as "Parque Olímpico Cidade do Rock" (City of Rock Olympic Park) or Parque dos Atletas (Athletes' Park), the venue started being built in 2010 and was completed one year later, to host the fourth edition of Rock in Rio. Further editions followed in 2013 and 2015.

On 2012, two international concerts were hosted there. Lady Gaga performed at the park during her Born This Way Ball tour on November 9 with an attendance of 26,167, and Madonna had a gig from the MDNA Tour on December 2 with an attendance of 34,709. The Red Hot Chili Peppers performed there in November 2013 on their 2013 Tour, and One Direction had a 2014 concert for the Where We Are Tour.

The park also hosted facilities for the 2016 Olympics.

Since 2017, all editions of Rock in Rio were held at the Barra Olympic Park, designated City of Rock during the festival.
