= Osmani Urrutia =

Cuban baseball player (born 1976)

- Outfielder
- Born: 29 June 1976 (age 49); Jobabo, Las Tunas Province, Cuba
- Bats: Right Throws: Right
Medals
Men's baseball
Representing Cuba
World Baseball Classic
Silver medal – second place	2006 San Diego	Team
Olympic Games
Gold medal – first place	2004 Athens	Team
Baseball World Cup
Gold medal – first place	2001 Taipei	Team
Gold medal – first place	2003 Havana	Team
Gold medal – first place	2005 Rotterdam	Team
Silver medal – second place	2007 Taipei	Team
Intercontinental Cup
Gold medal – first place	2006 Taichung	Team
Pan American Games
Gold medal – first place	2003 Santo Domingo	Team
Gold medal – first place	2007 Rio de Janeiro	Team
Central American and Caribbean Games
Gold medal – first place	2006 Cartagena	Team

Osmani Urrutia Ramírez (also spelled Osmany) (born June 29, 1976) is a Cuban former professional baseball outfielder. He played in the Cuban National Series (CNS) for the Las Tunas Magos and for the Cuba national baseball team.

== Cuban career ==
Playing for Las Tunas, Urrutia hit over .400 in the Cuban National Series for three straight years, beginning in 2000 (.431 in 2000-2001, .408 in 2001-2002 and .421 in 2002-2003).

== International experience ==
Urrutia, who is 1.78 m (5 ft 10 in) and 104 kg (229 lb), has competed in many international tournaments for Cuba, including:

- 2001 World Championship (Taiwan)
- 2000 and 2001 World Cup of Baseball in the Netherlands
- 2003 Pan American Games in Santo Domingo, Dominican Republic
- 2003 World Cup of Baseball (Cuba)
- 2004 Athens Olympics
- 2006 World Baseball Classic

During the 2005 World Cup of Baseball, Urrutia hit for a .387 average with five runs batted in (RBI) and 12 hits in 31 at-bats. During the 2006 World Baseball Classic, Urrutia batted .387 with one home run and seven RBI in eight games, leading team Cuba to the championship game, where they lost 10–6 to Japan.

== Personal life ==
Urrutia's nephew, Henry, played in Major League Baseball for the Baltimore Orioles.

Preceded by Javier Méndez	Cuban National Series MVP; 2003-04	Succeeded by Yulieski Gourriel
