= Óscar Rivera (baseball) =

Mexican baseball player (born 1981)

- Pitcher
- Born: 13 April 1981 (age 44); Magdalena de Kino, Sonora, Mexico
- Bats: Left Throws: Left

LMB statistics (through 2017 season)
- Win–loss record: 91–83
- Earned run average: 3.50
- Strikeouts: 949

Teams
- Leones de Yucatán (2001–2013); Sultanes de Monterrey (2014); Delfines del Carmen (2015–2016); Piratas de Campeche (2016–2017)

Career highlights and awards
- LMB: Pitched a perfect game on 7 August 2005
Medals
Men's baseball
Representing Mexico
Pan American Games
| Bronze medal – third place | 2007 Rio de Janeiro | Team |

Óscar Javier Rivera Ruiz (born 13 April 1981) is a Mexican former professional baseball pitcher. He played seventeen seasons in the Mexican League (LMB) from 2001 to 2017, most of them with the Leones de Yucatán, and eleven seasons in the Mexican Pacific League (LMP) between 2002 and 2014.

Rivera represented Mexico, winning the bronze medal at the 2007 Pan American Games.

== Early life ==
Rivera was born on 13 April 1981 in Magdalena de Kino, Sonora. His family lived in the nearby town of Terrenate in the Ímuris Municipality, where he spent his early years. He became the bat boy of Terrenate's baseball team, the Verduleros (Greengrocers). When Rivera was 14 years old, he was allowed to join the Verduleros, a team mainly composed of adult players.

In 1998, Rivera attended a tryout held in Nogales, Sonora, by the Mexican League club Leones de Yucatán. In 1999, he signed with Yucatán and was assigned to a local team in Mérida. In 2000, he was assigned to Sahuayo of the Liga del Bajío (Bajío League).

== Professional career ==
=== Mexican League ===
Rivera made his professional debut in the Mexican League (LMB) in 2001 playing for the Leones de Yucatán, aged 19. In his debut season, he appeared in 21 games, recording 2 wins and 1 loss, with a 1.61 ERA. In 2004, he became a starter for the Leones.

On 7 August 2005, Rivera threw a perfect game, the tenth in league history and the first (and, as of 2025, only) in the postseason. The feat came against the Guerreros de Oaxaca in Game 5 of the playoffs first round, a 1–0 Leones victory at Parque Kukulcán in Mérida. Yucatán would reach the Championship Series but lose to the Tigres de la Angelópolis, 2–4, who went on to win the Final Series and become league champions.

In 2007, Rivera played three games for the Colorado Rockies organization. He made two appearances with the Colorado Springs Sky Sox of the Triple-A Pacific Coast League, recording 1 win and 1 loss. He also played one game for the Tulsa Drillers of the Double-A Texas League.

In 2014, after thirteen seasons with the Leones de Yucatán, Rivera left the team to join the Sultanes de Monterrey. He later played for the Delfines del Carmen in 2015 and 2016 and for the Piratas de Campeche during the rest of the 2016 season and 2017, retiring after the 2017 season.

=== Mexican Pacific League ===
Rivera also played winter baseball in the Mexican Pacific League (LMP). He made his debut in 2002, playing for the Cañeros de Los Mochis. From 2005 to 2008, he played for the Mayos de Navojoa. From 2008 to 2012, he played for the Águilas de Mexicali. He spent his last LMP season, 2013–14, playing for the Naranjeros de Hermosillo and Yaquis de Obregón.

== International career ==
Rivera was part of the Mexican team that won the bronze medal at the 2007 Pan American Games in Rio de Janeiro. He started in one game, against Cuba, which he lost. In that game, his only appearance in the tournament, he pitched five innings, allowed four hits and two earned runs and struck out three batters, finishing the tournament with a 3.60 ERA.
